= List of census-designated places in Alaska =

Map of the United States with Alaska highlighted.

Alaska is a state situated in the northwest extremity of the North American continent. According to the 2010 United States census, Alaska is the 3rd least populous state with 733,391 inhabitants but is the largest by land area spanning 665,384.04 square miles (1,723,336.8 km^{2}) of land. As of the 2020 Census, Alaska has 206 census-designated places.

Changes for 2020 include the addition of five census-designated places: Eareckson Station (last gazetted in 1980), Mill Bay, North Lakes, Petersburg (a former city), and South Lakes. Six former census-designates places counted for the 2010 census were not included in 2020: Edna Bay, incorporated in 2014; Lakes, split into North Lakes and South Lakes; New Allakaket, annexed by neighboring Allakaket in March 2015; Northway Junction and Northway Village, both merged with Northway; and Whale Pass, incorporated in 2017.

Changes for 2010 include the addition of twelve new census-designated places: Badger, Chena Ridge, Eureka Roadhouse, Farmers Loop, Goldstream, Loring, Mertarvik, Nabesna, Point Possession, South Van Horn, Steele Creek, and Whitestone. Six former census-designated places counted for the 2000 census were not included in 2010: Alpine, Copperville (merged into Tazlina CDP), Cube Cove, Miller Landing (annexed to Homer city), Meyers Chuck and Thoms Place (both incorporated into Wrangell city and borough). Two former CDPs became cities: Adak (incorporated in 2001) and Gustavus (incorporated in 2004). Skagway (disincorporated in 2007) is now a census-designated place. Finally, one census-designated place has a new name: Y is now Susitna North.

== List of census-designated places ==
Rank (2020)	Name	2020 Pop.	2010 Pop.	2000 Pop.	Census code (FIPS code)	Borough or Census area	Coordinates
1	Knik-Fairview	19,297	14,923	7,049	02-40645	Matanuska-Susitna Borough	61°31′39″N 149°35′53″W
2	Badger	19,031	19,482	n/a	02-05000	Fairbanks North Star Borough	64°48′19″N 147°24′37″W
3	College	11,332	12,964	11,402	02-16750	Fairbanks North Star Borough	64°50′54″N 147°49′38″W
4	North Lakes	9,450	n/a	n/a	02-55745	Matanuska-Susitna Borough	61°36′27″N 149°18′7″W
5	Meadow Lakes	9,197	7,570	4,819	02-47735	Matanuska-Susitna Borough	61°35′59″N 149°36′58″W
6	Tanaina	8,817	8,197	4,993	02-75077	Matanuska-Susitna Borough	61°37′27″N 149°25′58″W
7	Kalifornsky	8,487	7,850	5,846	02-37250	Kenai Peninsula Borough	60°28′24″N 151°12′5″W
8	Steele Creek	6,437	6,662	n/a	02-72985	Fairbanks North Star Borough	64°54′10″N 147°24′39″W
9	Chena Ridge	6,015	5,791	n/a	02-12920	Fairbanks North Star Borough	64°49′54″N 147°55′42″W
10	Sterling	5,918	5,617	4,705	02-73070	Kenai Peninsula Borough	60°31′47″N 150°47′52″W
11	Gateway	5,748	5,552	2,952	02-28200	Matanuska-Susitna Borough	61°34′35″N 149°15′9″W
12	South Lakes	5,229	n/a	n/a	02-72135	Matanuska-Susitna Borough	61°35′7″N 149°18′36″W
13	Fishhook	5,048	4,679	2,030	02-25550	Matanuska-Susitna Borough	61°40′38″N 149°15′54″W
14	Farmers Loop	4,704	4,853	n/a	02-24980	Fairbanks North Star Borough	64°53′48″N 147°41′39″W
15	Nikiski	4,456	4,493	4,327	02-54050	Kenai Peninsula Borough	60°42′28″N 151°15′46″W
16	Mill Bay	4,216	n/a	n/a	02-49200	Kodiak Island Borough	57°49′16″N 152°21′17″W
17	Big Lake	3,833	3,350	2,635	02-07070	Matanuska-Susitna Borough	61°32′15″N 149°53′28″W
18	Butte	3,589	3,246	2,561	02-09710	Matanuska-Susitna Borough	61°32′53″N 149°1′36″W
19	Goldstream	3,299	3,557	n/a	02-29130	Fairbanks North Star Borough	64°57′14″N 147°37′42″W
20	Petersburg	3,043	2,948	3,224	02-60310	Petersburg Borough	56°48′16″N 132°56′31″W
21	Farm Loop	2,747	1,028	1,067	02-25000	Matanuska-Susitna Borough	61°37′42″N 149°8′44″W
22	Eielson AFB	2,610	2,647	5,400	02-21370	Fairbanks North Star Borough	64°39′56″N 147°6′5″W
23	Ester	2,416	2,422	1,680	02-23460	Fairbanks North Star Borough	64°51′21″N 147°58′42″W
24	Deltana	2,359	2,251	1,570	02-18675	Southeast Fairbanks Census Area	63°57′50″N 145°24′32″W
25	Fritz Creek	2,248	1,932	1,603	02-27090	Kenai Peninsula Borough	59°43′54″N 151°15′2″W
26	Willow	2,196	2,102	1,658	02-85280	Matanuska-Susitna Borough	61°46′10″N 149°59′28″W
27	Ridgeway	2,136	2,022	1,932	02-65345	Kenai Peninsula Borough	60°31′11″N 151°3′39″W
28	Bear Creek	2,129	1,956	1,748	02-05585	Kenai Peninsula Borough	60°10′34″N 149°23′42″W
29	Anchor Point	2,105	1,930	1,845	02-03110	Kenai Peninsula Borough	59°46′39″N 151°46′13″W
30	Point MacKenzie	1,852	529	111	02-61788	Matanuska-Susitna Borough	61°22′30″N 149°54′45″W
31	Kodiak Station	1,673	1,301	1,840	02-41210	Kodiak Island Borough	57°45′1″N 152°30′23″W
32	Haines	1,657	1,713	1,811	02-31050	Haines Borough	59°14′2″N 135°26′49″W
33	Susitna North	1,564	1,260	956	02-74350	Matanuska-Susitna Borough	62°2′12″N 149°59′14″W
34	Lazy Mountain	1,506	1,479	1,158	02-43260	Matanuska-Susitna Borough	61°37′32″N 149°2′42″W
35	Cohoe	1,471	1,364	1,168	02-16420	Kenai Peninsula Borough	60°18′5″N 151°17′45″W
36	Metlakatla	1,454	1,405	1,375	02-48870	Prince of Wales-Hyder Census Area	55°7′37″N 131°34′35″W
37	Diamond Ridge	1,330	1,156	1,802	02-18925	Kenai Peninsula Borough	59°39′55″N 151°34′15″W
38	Prudhoe Bay	1,310	2,174	5	02-64380	North Slope Borough	70°19′32″N 148°42′41″W
39	Tok	1,243	1,258	1,393	02-77800	Southeast Fairbanks Census Area	63°19′27″N 143°1′5″W
40	Skagway	1,164	920	862	02-70760	Municipality and Borough of Skagway	59°27′30″N 135°18′50″W
41	Funny River	1,103	877	636	02-27145	Kenai Peninsula Borough	60°29′38″N 150°46′54″W
42	Salamatof	1,078	980	954	02-66510	Kenai Peninsula Borough	60°35′36″N 151°18′38″W
43	Talkeetna	1,055	876	772	02-74830	Matanuska-Susitna Borough	62°18′41″N 150°5′13″W
44	Sutton-Alpine	1,038	1,447	1,080	02-74525	Matanuska-Susitna Borough	61°42′45″N 148°53′8″W
45	Buffalo Soapstone	1,021	855	699	02-09657	Matanuska-Susitna Borough	61°41′25″N 149°7′27″W
46	Salcha	977	1,095	854	02-66550	Fairbanks North Star Borough	64°31′16″N 146°58′50″W
47	Healy	966	1,021	1,000	02-32150	Denali Borough	63°58′15″N 149°7′37″W
48	Ninilchik	845	883	772	02-54480	Kenai Peninsula Borough	60°2′47″N 151°40′2″W
49	Knik River	792	744	582	02-40670	Matanuska-Susitna Borough	61°30′28″N 149°0′13″W
50	Womens Bay	743	719	690	02-85680	Kodiak Island Borough	57°42′6″N 152°34′20″W
51	Happy Valley	713	593	489	02-31710	Kenai Peninsula Borough	59°56′54″N 151°43′7″W
52	Kipnuk	704	639	644	02-39740	Bethel Census Area	59°56′15″N 164°2′38″W
53	Akiachak	677	627	585	02-00760	Bethel Census Area	60°54′34″N 161°25′53″W
54	Yakutat	657	662	680	02-86490	Yakutat City and Borough	59°32′49″N 139°43′38″W
55	Two Rivers	650	719	482	02-79830	Fairbanks North Star Borough	64°51′45″N 147°5′56″W
56	Fox River	644	685	616	02-26910	Kenai Peninsula Borough	59°50′51″N 150°55′34″W
57	Kasigluk	623	569	543	02-37975	Bethel Census Area	60°53′31″N 162°32′9″W
58	Pleasant Valley	606	725	623	02-61120	Fairbanks North Star Borough	64°52′38″N 146°53′2″W
59	Noatak	570	514	428	02-54700	Northwest Arctic Borough	67°34′19″N 162°58′30″W
60	Moose Creek	534	747	542	02-50080	Fairbanks North Star Borough	64°42′45″N 147°9′40″W
61	Kasilof	525	549	471	02-38090	Kenai Peninsula Borough	60°20′7″N 151°14′1″W
62	South Van Horn	503	558	n/a	02-72230	Fairbanks North Star Borough	64°48′34″N 147°47′17″W
63	Trapper Creek	499	481	423	02-78680	Matanuska-Susitna Borough	62°18′29″N 150°21′3″W
64	Kongiganak	486	439	359	02-41610	Bethel Census Area	59°57′14″N 162°53′43″W
65	Naknek	470	544	678	02-52060	Bristol Bay Borough	58°44′23″N 156°58′18″W
66	Tuntutuliak	469	408	370	02-79120	Bethel Census Area	60°20′34″N 162°40′22″W
67	Big Delta	444	591	749	02-06850	Southeast Fairbanks Census Area	64°8′50″N 145°48′6″W
67	Tuluksak	444	373	428	02-78790	Bethel Census Area	61°6′9″N 160°57′38″W
69	Glennallen	439	483	554	02-28740	Copper River Census Area	62°6′35″N 145°33′26″W
70	Fox	406	417	300	02-26870	Fairbanks North Star Borough	64°57′14″N 147°37′42″W
71	Tununak	411	327	325	02-79230	Bethel Census Area	60°34′50″N 165°15′34″W
72	Atmautluak	386	277	294	02-04430	Bethel Census Area	60°51′35″N 162°16′39″W
73	Kwigillingok	380	321	338	02-42490	Bethel Census Area	59°52′20″N 163°9′58″W
74	Glacier View	375	234	249	02-28590	Matanuska-Susitna Borough	61°49′7″N 147°42′53″W
75	Cooper Landing	344	289	369	02-17190	Kenai Peninsula Borough	60°29′26″N 149°47′40″W
76	Copper Center	338	328	362	02-17300	Copper River Census Area	61°57′55″N 145°19′6″W
77	Point Lay	330	189	247	02-61700	North Slope Borough	69°44′28″N 163°0′31″W
78	Nikolaevsk	328	318	345	02-54085	Kenai Peninsula Borough	59°48′43″N 151°36′36″W
79	Fort Greely	309	539	461	02-26100	Southeast Fairbanks Census Area	63°54′18″N 145°33′16″W
80	King Salmon	307	374	442	02-39630	Bristol Bay Borough	58°41′10″N 156°39′18″W
81	Chickaloon	254	272	213	02-13340	Matanuska-Susitna Borough	61°47′38″N 148°28′58″W
82	Harding-Birch Lakes	253	299	216	02-31765	Fairbanks North Star Borough	64°19′57″N 146°46′47″W
83	Nanwalek	247	254	177	02-52210	Kenai Peninsula Borough	59°21′13″N 151°54′45″W
84	Tazlina	244	297	149	02-75480	Copper River Census Area	62°2′57″N 145°24′55″W
85	Seldovia Village	235	165	144	02-68370	Kenai Peninsula Borough	59°28′43″N 151°37′53″W
86	Kenny Lake	234	355	410	02-38910	Copper River Census Area	61°42′12″N 144°53′48″W
86	Northway	234	71	95	02-56220	Southeast Fairbanks Census Area	62°58′9″N 141°54′18″W
88	Eareckson Station	232	0	0	02-20716	Aleutians West Census Area	52°42′44″N 174°6′49″E
89	Moose Pass	228	219	206	02-50190	Kenai Peninsula Borough	60°29′16″N 149°22′15″W
90	Newtok	209	354	321	02-53820	Bethel Census Area	60°56′40″N 164°38′39″W
91	Clam Gulch	207	176	173	02-15320	Kenai Peninsula Borough	60°13′40″N 151°23′38″W
92	Venetie	205	166	202	02-82420	Yukon-Koyukuk Census Area	67°3′20″N 146°24′58″W
93	Cantwell	200	219	222	02-10150	Denali Borough	63°23′17″N 148°54′1″W
94	Willow Creek	190	191	201	02-85290	Copper River Census Area	61°47′49″N 145°11′10″W
95	Port Alsworth	186	159	104	02-62620	Lake and Peninsula Borough	60°12′30″N 154°18′24″W
96	Koliganek	183	209	182	02-41500	Dillingham Census Area	59°43′44″N 157°16′38″W
97	Gakona	169	218	215	02-27420	Copper River Census Area	62°18′17″N 145°16′24″W
97	Manley Hot Springs	169	89	72	02-46780	Yukon-Koyukuk Census Area	65°0′28″N 150°37′36″W
99	Denali Park (formerly McKinley Park)	163	185	142	02-18805	Denali Borough	63°25′48″N 150°19′12″W
100	Port Graham	162	177	171	02-63280	Kenai Peninsula Borough	59°20′52″N 151°50′0″W
101	Hope	161	192	137	02-33580	Kenai Peninsula Borough	60°55′10″N 149°38′31″W
102	Mud Bay	159	212	137	02-51455	Haines Borough	59°8′54″N 135°21′12″W
103	Kokhanok	152	170	174	02-41280	Lake and Peninsula Borough	59°26′27″N 154°44′49″W
103	Tyonek	152	171	193	02-79890	Kenai Peninsula Borough	61°4′5″N 151°8′28″W
105	Arctic Village	151	152	152	02-03990	Yukon-Koyukuk Census Area	68°7′19″N 145°31′40″W
106	Minto	150	210	258	02-49530	Yukon-Koyukuk Census Area	65°9′28″N 149°22′12″W
107	Tanacross	144	136	140	02-75050	Southeast Fairbanks Census Area	63°22′34″N 143°21′25″W
108	Naukati Bay	142	113	135	02-52845	Prince of Wales-Hyder Census Area	55°52′25″N 133°11′5″W
109	Mentasta Lake	127	112	142	02-48540	Copper River Census Area	62°55′26″N 143°32′0″W
110	Tetlin	126	127	117	02-76590	Southeast Fairbanks Census Area	63°8′16″N 142°31′28″W
111	Mosquito Lake	120	309	221	02-50800	Haines Borough	59°25′40″N 136°9′48″W
111	Pitkas Point	120	109	125	02-60860	Kusilvak Census Area	62°2′8″N 163°15′39″W
113	Crown Point	119	74	75	02-17960	Kenai Peninsula Borough	60°25′8″N 149°21′19″W
114	Slana	116	147	124	02-70930	Copper River Census Area	62°41′51″N 143°49′46″W
115	Silver Springs	111	114	130	02-70320	Copper River Census Area	62°1′16″N 145°21′16″W
116	Gulkana	110	119	88	02-30500	Copper River Census Area	62°14′25″N 145°25′22″W
117	Iliamna	108	109	102	02-35120	Lake and Peninsula Borough	59°45′54″N 154°50′25″W
118	McCarthy	107	28	42	02-45790	Copper River Census Area	61°25′58″N 142°54′39″W
119	Twin Hills	103	74	69	02-79780	Dillingham Census Area	59°4′41″N 160°17′4″W
120	Chitina	101	126	123	02-14110	Copper River Census Area	61°30′57″N 144°26′12″W
121	Mertarvik	99	0	n/a	02-48590	Bethel Census Area	60°49′14″N 164°30′34″W
122	Chignik Lagoon	97	78	103	02-13670	Lake and Peninsula Borough	56°18′27″N 158°32′6″W
123	Primrose	96	78	93	02-64240	Kenai Peninsula Borough	60°20′36″N 149°20′39″W
124	Circle	91	104	100	02-14880	Yukon-Koyukuk Census Area	65°49′31″N 144°3′43″W
125	Sleetmute	90	86	100	02-71090	Bethel Census Area	61°41′2″N 157°9′7″W
125	Tatitlek	90	88	107	02-75380	Chugach Census Area	60°52′1″N 146°40′38″W
125	Crooked Creek	90	105	137	02-17850	Bethel Census Area	61°51′35″N 158°7′44″W
128	Perryville	88	113	107	02-60200	Lake and Peninsula Borough	55°54′49″N 159°9′4″W
129	Klukwan	87	95	139	02-40510	Hoonah-Angoon Census Area	59°24′0″N 135°53′36″W
130	Lowell Point	79	80	92	02-45295	Kenai Peninsula Borough	60°4′18″N 149°26′37″W
131	Whitestone	71	97	n/a	02-84120	Southeast Fairbanks Census Area	64°9′10″N 145°54′23″W
132	Oscarville	70	70	61	02-58330	Bethel Census Area	60°43′17″N 161°46′6″W
133	Levelock	69	69	122	02-43810	Lake and Peninsula Borough	59°6′37″N 156°51′31″W
134	Igiugig	68	50	53	02-34790	Lake and Peninsula Borough	59°19′49″N 155°54′29″W
135	South Naknek	67	79	137	02-72190	Bristol Bay Borough	58°42′42″N 157°1′3″W
136	Central	66	96	134	02-11690	Yukon-Koyukuk Census Area	65°32′0″N 144°41′44″W
137	Hollis	65	112	139	02-32810	Prince of Wales-Hyder Census Area	55°29′11″N 132°38′22″W
138	Skwentna	62	37	111	02-70870	Matanuska-Susitna Borough	61°52′46″N 151°15′59″W
139	Chignik Lake	61	73	145	02-13780	Lake and Peninsula Borough	56°16′10″N 158°46′54″W
140	Dry Creek	61	94	128	02-20020	Southeast Fairbanks Census Area	63°41′1″N 144°36′15″W
140	Chiniak	61	47	50	02-13860	Kodiak Island Borough	57°36′38″N 152°11′59″W
142	Chistochina	60	93	93	02-14000	Copper River Census Area	62°34′40″N 144°40′11″W
142	Halibut Cove	60	76	35	02-31270	Kenai Peninsula Borough	59°35′51″N 151°14′5″W
144	Chenega	59	76	86	02-12970	Chugach Census Area	60°3′59″N 148°0′40″W
145	Rampart	57	24	45	02-64820	Yukon-Koyukuk Census Area	65°30′26″N 150°8′55″W
145	Stony River	57	54	61	02-73400	Bethel Census Area	61°47′15″N 156°35′28″W
147	Chalkyitsik	56	69	83	02-11800	Yukon-Koyukuk Census Area	66°39′6″N 143°43′38″W
147	Takotna	56	52	50	02-74610	Yukon-Koyukuk Census Area	62°58′56″N 156°5′3″W
149	Tonsina	55	78	92	02-78350	Copper River Census Area	61°39′43″N 145°10′39″W
150	Eagle Village	53	67	68	02-20600	Southeast Fairbanks Census Area	64°46′53″N 141°6′53″W
151	Hyder	48	87	97	02-34570	Prince of Wales-Hyder Census Area	55°54′51″N 130°1′28″W
151	Beaver	48	84	84	02-05750	Yukon-Koyukuk Census Area	66°21′35″N 147°23′51″W
153	Nelchina	45	59	71	02-52915	Copper River Census Area	61°59′24″N 146°46′44″W
154	Pedro Bay	43	42	50	02-59540	Lake and Peninsula Borough	59°46′56″N 154°7′57″W
155	Nelson Lagoon	41	52	83	02-52940	Aleutians East Borough	56°0′2″N 161°12′13″W
156	Excursion Inlet	40	12	10	02-23900	Haines Borough	58°24′41″N 135°24′31″W
157	Nikolski	39	18	39	02-54260	Aleutians West Census Area	52°56′29″N 168°51′39″W
158	Stevens Village	37	78	87	02-73290	Yukon-Koyukuk Census Area	66°0′19″N 149°6′11″W
159	Alcan Border	36	33	21	02-01390	Southeast Fairbanks Census Area	62°39′42″N 141°9′40″W
159	Mendeltna	36	39	63	02-48200	Copper River Census Area	62°3′35″N 146°26′20″W
159	Port Protection	36	48	63	02-63870	Prince of Wales-Hyder Census Area	56°19′19″N 133°36′24″W
162	Birch Creek	35	33	28	02-07620	Yukon-Koyukuk Census Area	66°15′24″N 145°48′55″W
163	Beluga	34	20	32	02-06245	Kenai Peninsula Borough	61°8′2″N 151°9′53″W
163	Coldfoot	34	10	13	02-16630	Yukon-Koyukuk Census Area	67°15′5″N 150°10′34″W
165	Lake Minchumina	30	13	32	02-42820	Yukon-Koyukuk Census Area	63°53′38″N 152°18′7″W
166	Lutak	29	49	39	02-45700	Haines Borough	59°19′50″N 135°37′34″W
167	Karluk	27	37	27	02-37540	Kodiak Island Borough	57°34′41″N 154°21′45″W
167	Petersville	27	4	27	02-60460	Matanuska-Susitna Borough	62°22′37″N 150°44′49″W
169	Paxson	26	40	43	02-59320	Copper River Census Area	63°2′43″N 145°36′51″W
170	Covenant Life	25	86	102	02-17670	Haines Borough	59°24′0″N 136°4′35″W
171	Elfin Cove	24	20	32	02-22140	Hoonah-Angoon Census Area	58°11′56″N 136°21′19″W
171	Eureka Roadhouse	24	29	n/a	02-23720	Matanuska-Susitna Borough	61°57′53″N 147°9′6″W
171	Healy Lake	24	13	37	02-32310	Southeast Fairbanks Census Area	63°59′20″N 144°42′29″W
174	Dot Lake Village	23	62	38	02-19750	Southeast Fairbanks Census Area	63°39′1″N 144°2′34″W
174	Game Creek	23	18	35	02-27700	Hoonah-Angoon Census Area	58°3′31″N 135°30′47″W
176	Red Devil	22	23	48	02-64930	Bethel Census Area	61°46′41″N 157°20′54″W
177	Dot Lake	21	13	19	02-19720	Southeast Fairbanks Census Area	63°39′31″N 144°3′57″W
178	Chase	19	34	41	02-12350	Matanuska-Susitna Borough	62°25′20″N 150°4′39″W
179	Four Mile Road	18	43	38	02-26835	Yukon-Koyukuk Census Area	64°35′47″N 149°7′32″W
180	Ferry	17	33	29	02-25220	Denali Borough	64°3′52″N 148°59′49″W
181	Livengood	16	13	29	02-44580	Yukon-Koyukuk Census Area	65°29′24″N 148°32′48″W
182	Alatna	15	37	35	02-01305	Yukon-Koyukuk Census Area	66°32′56″N 152°50′41″W
182	Lake Louise	15	46	88	02-42805	Matanuska-Susitna Borough	62°17′4″N 146°33′25″W
182	Sunrise	15	18	18	02-73950	Kenai Peninsula Borough	60°53′8″N 149°25′28″W
185	Lime Village	13	29	6	02-44030	Bethel Census Area	61°20′29″N 155°29′27″W
186	Chicken	12	7	17	02-13450	Southeast Fairbanks Census Area	64°4′23″N 141°56′2″W
186	Evansville	12	15	28	02-23790	Yukon-Koyukuk Census Area	66°54′11″N 151°29′57″W
186	Point Baker	12	15	35	02-61190	Prince of Wales-Hyder Census Area	56°21′9″N 133°37′43″W
186	Tolsona	12	30	27	02-78297	Copper River Census Area	62°6′0″N 146°2′26″W
190	Susitna	11	18	37	02-74340	Matanuska-Susitna Borough	61°33′27″N 150°34′36″W
191	Point Possession	9	3	n/a	02-61825	Kenai Peninsula Borough	60°55′23″N 150°41′20″W
192	Pope-Vannoy Landing	6	6	8	02-62125	Lake and Peninsula Borough	59°32′15″N 154°31′50″W
193	Aleneva	5	37	68	02-01560	Kodiak Island Borough	58°3′49″N 152°54′37″W
193	Red Dog Mine	5	309	32	02-64980	Northwest Arctic Borough	68°4′19″N 162°52′34″W
193	Wiseman	5	5	21	02-85610	Yukon-Koyukuk Census Area	67°24′34″N 150°6′35″W
196	Portage Creek	4	2	36	02-62285	Dillingham Census Area	58°54′22″N 157°43′0″W
196	Ugashik	4	12	11	02-80100	Lake and Peninsula Borough	57°32′3″N 157°16′8″W
198	Nabesna	2	5	n/a	02-51960	Copper River Census Area	62°22′16″N 143°0′50″W
198	Whitestone Logging Camp	2	17	116	02-84200	Hoonah-Angoon Census Area	58°5′7″N 135°26′54″W
200	Hobart Bay	1	1	3	02-32550	Petersburg Borough	57°27′11″N 133°23′36″W
200	Ivanof Bay	1	7	22	02-35890	Lake and Peninsula Borough	55°54′40″N 159°29′21″W
202	Attu Station	0	21	20	02-04670	Aleutians West Census Area	52°50′47″N 173°11′10″E
202	Chisana	0	0	0	02-13890	Copper River Census Area	62°3′58″N 142°2′27″W
202	Flat	0	0	4	02-25880	Yukon-Koyukuk Census Area	62°27′15″N 158°0′30″W
202	Loring	0	4	n/a	02-45020	Ketchikan Gateway Borough	55°36′11″N 131°38′13″W
202	Port Clarence	0	24	21	02-63170	Nome Census Area	65°15′58″N 166°51′10″W

== List of former census-designated places ==
Name	2010 Pop.	2000 Pop.	Census code (FIPS code)	Borough or Census area
Copperville	n/a	179	02-17380	Copper River Census Area
Cube Cove	n/a	72	02-18030	Hoonah-Angoon Census Area
Meyers Chuck	n/a	21	02-48980	Wrangell City and Borough
Miller Landing	n/a	74	02-49435	Kenai Peninsula Borough
Thoms Place	n/a	22	02-76970	Petersburg Census Area
Alpine	n/a	0	02-01882	North Slope Borough

== See also ==
- List of boroughs and census areas in Alaska
- List of cities in Alaska
