= Steele Creek, Alaska =

- Census-designated place
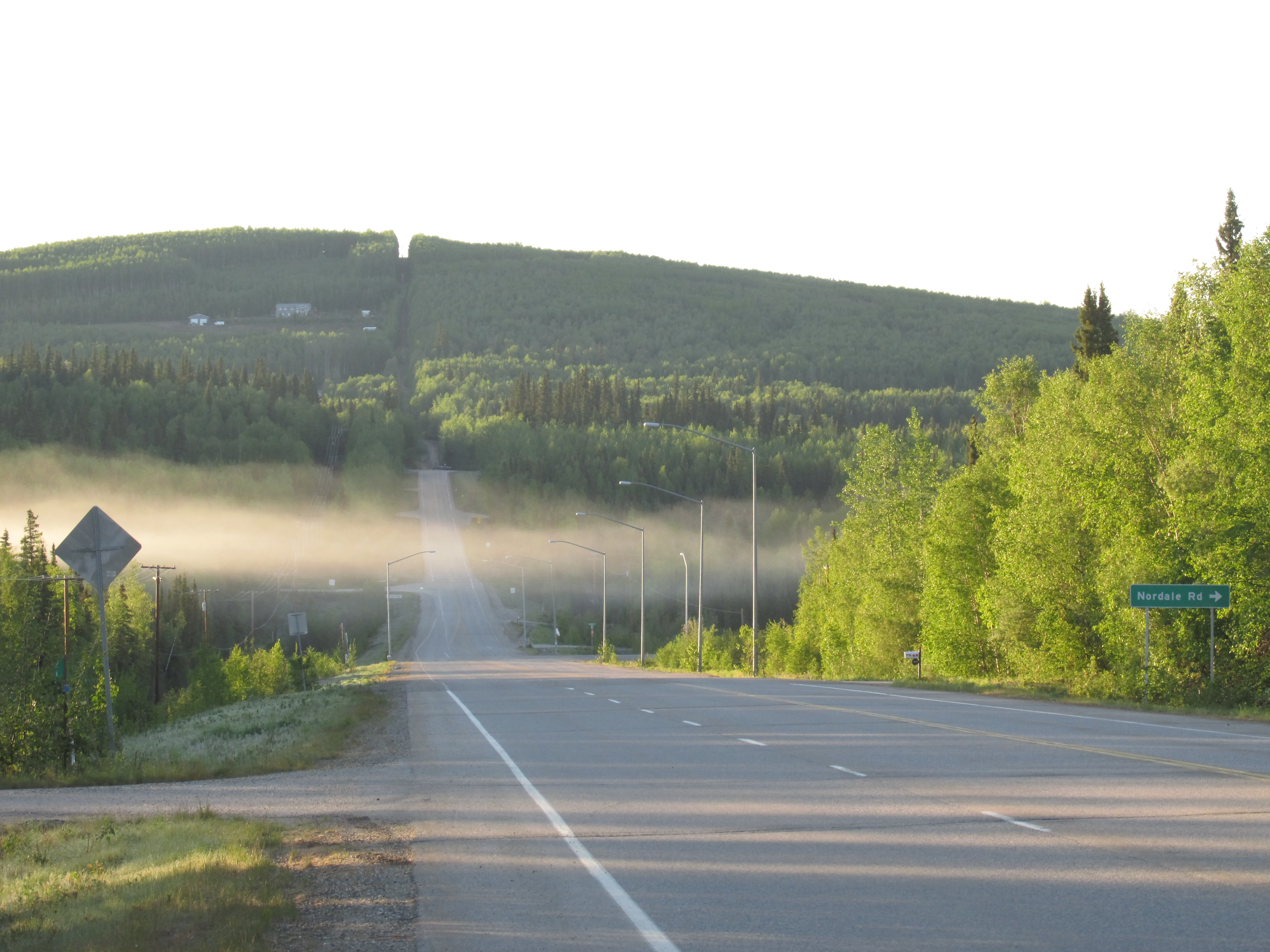
- Chena Hot Springs Road runs through the CDP for 11.6 miles (18.7 km), from its intersection with the Steese Expressway to its crossing of the Little Chena River. This view looks eastbound at the intersection of CHSR with Nordale Road.

- Location within Fairbanks North Star Borough and the state of Alaska
- Country: United States
- State: Alaska

Government
  - Borough mayor: Grier Hopkins
  - State senator: Robert Myers (R)
  - State reps.: Mike Prax (R); Frank Tomaszewski (R)

Area
  - Total: 92.91 sq mi (240.63 km^{2})
  - Land: 92.89 sq mi (240.59 km^{2})
  - Water: 0.015 sq mi (0.04 km^{2})
- Elevation: 500 ft (150 m)

Population (2020)
  - Total: 6,437
  - Density: 69.3/sq mi (26.76/km^{2})
- Time zone: UTC-9 (Alaska (AKST))
  - Summer (DST): UTC-8 (AKDT)
- ZIP code: 99712
- Area code: 907
- FIPS code: 02-72985
- GNIS feature ID: 2582718

Steele Creek is a census-designated place (CDP) in Fairbanks North Star Borough, Alaska, United States. It is part of the Fairbanks, Alaska Metropolitan Statistical Area. As of the 2020 census, the population was 6,437, down from 6,662 in 2010. It is the eighth-most populated CDP in Alaska.

== Geography ==
Steele Creek is located northeast of Fairbanks and east of the Steese Highway. The community is named for the creek which flows from north to south across the western part of the CDP, rising on Tungsten Hill and flowing towards the Chena River. The CDP extends east as far as the Little Chena River and Iowa Creek. The CDP is bounded by Two Rivers to the east, Badger to the south, Fairbanks to the southwest, Farmers Loop to the west, and Fox to the northwest.

According to the U.S. Census Bureau, the Steele Creek CDP has a total area of 92.9 square miles (240.5 km^{2}), of which 0.004 square miles (0.01 km^{2}), or 0.01%, is water.

== Demographics ==
Historical population
Census	Pop.	Note	%±
2010	6,662		—
2020	6,437		−3.4%
U.S. Decennial Census

=== 2020 census ===
As of the 2020 census, Steele Creek had a population of 6,437. The median age was 39.1 years. 24.5% of residents were under the age of 18 and 14.3% of residents were 65 years of age or older. For every 100 females there were 103.8 males, and for every 100 females age 18 and over there were 106.2 males age 18 and over.

22.8% of residents lived in urban areas, while 77.2% lived in rural areas.

There were 2,440 households in Steele Creek, of which 30.7% had children under the age of 18 living in them. Of all households, 61.7% were married-couple households, 18.5% were households with a male householder and no spouse or partner present, and 14.3% were households with a female householder and no spouse or partner present. About 23.0% of all households were made up of individuals and 7.3% had someone living alone who was 65 years of age or older.

There were 2,695 housing units, of which 9.5% were vacant. The homeowner vacancy rate was 1.3% and the rental vacancy rate was 12.8%.

Racial composition as of the 2020 census
Race	Number	Percent
White	5,066	78.7%
Black or African American	60	0.9%
American Indian and Alaska Native	328	5.1%
Asian	106	1.6%
Native Hawaiian and Other Pacific Islander	25	0.4%
Some other race	135	2.1%
Two or more races	717	11.1%
Hispanic or Latino (of any race)	303	4.7%

=== 2010 census ===
As of the census of 2010, there were 6,662 people, 2,525 households, and 1,806 families residing in the CDP. There were 2,743 housing units. The racial makeup of the CDP was 87.4% White, 0.8% Black or African American, 3.8% Native American, 0.9% Asian, 0.2% Pacific Islander, 1.1% from other races, and 5.9% from two or more races. 3.2% of the population were Hispanic or Latino of any race.

== See also ==
- Meadow Lakes, Alaska
- Goldstream, Alaska
