= College, Alaska =

College, Alaska Trothyeddha'
- Census-designated place
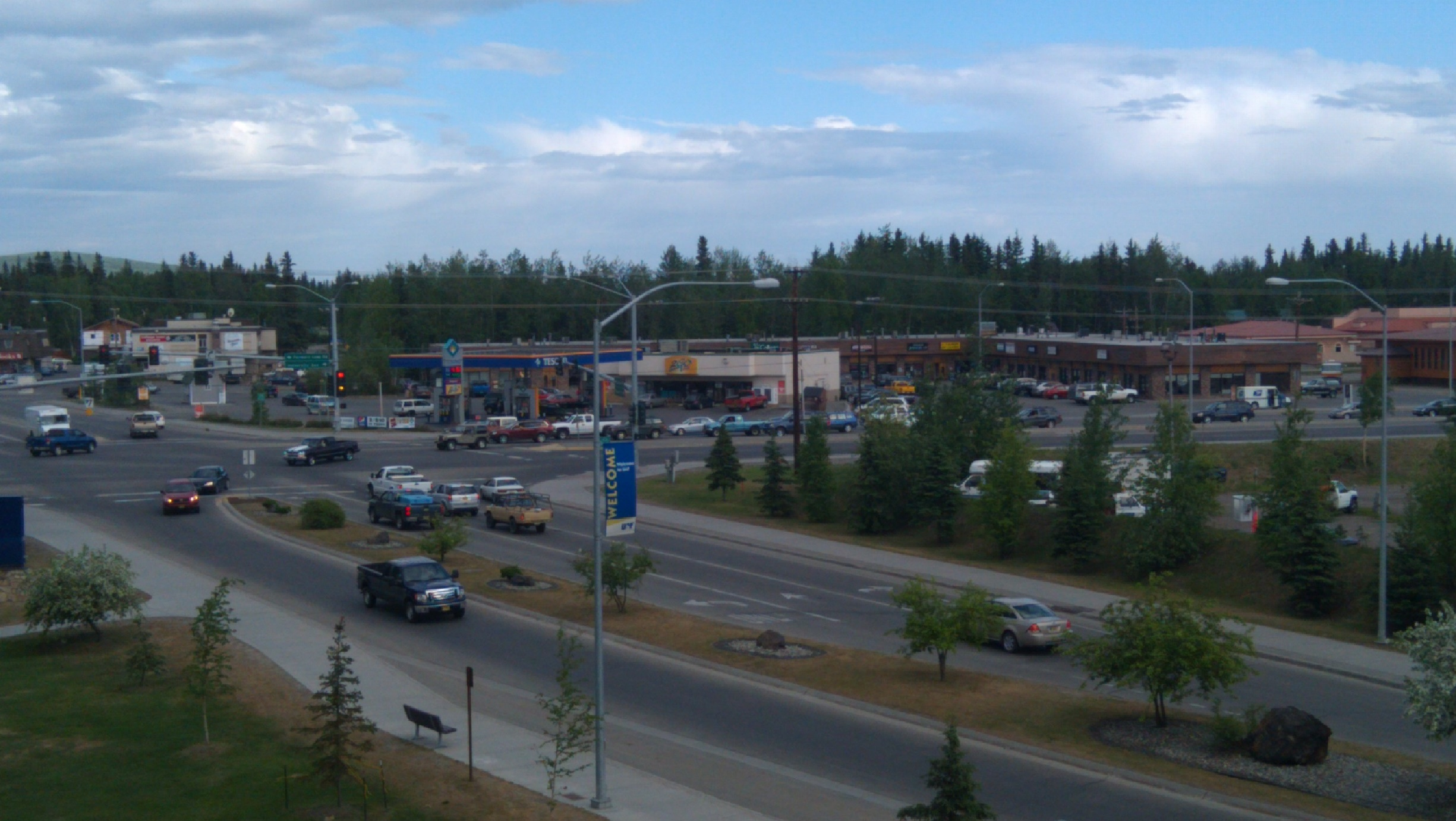
- The intersection of Alumni Drive/College Road with Farmers Loop Road/University Avenue is the historic and commercial center of the College community. Photo taken June 2011 from the side of Troth Yeddha' (College Hill), upon which the University of Alaska Fairbanks campus sits.

- Location within Fairbanks North Star Borough and the state of Alaska
- Coordinates: 64°50′54″N 147°49′38″W
- Country: United States
- State: Alaska
- Borough: Fairbanks North Star

Government
  - Borough mayor: Grier Hopkins
  - State senators: Click Bishop (R); Scott Kawasaki (D); Robert Myers (R)
  - State reps.: Ashley Carrick (D); Maxine Dibert (D); Frank Tomaszewski (R)

Area
  - Total: 19.12 sq mi (49.53 km^{2})
  - Land: 18.71 sq mi (48.46 km^{2})
  - Water: 0.41 sq mi (1.07 km^{2})
- Elevation: 449 ft (137 m)

Population (2020)
  - Total: 11,332
  - Density: 605.6/sq mi (233.82/km^{2})
- Time zone: UTC-9 (Alaska (AKST))
  - Summer (DST): UTC-8 (AKDT)
- ZIP code: 99709
- Area code: 907
- FIPS code: 02-16750
- GNIS feature ID: 1400578

College (Lower Tanana: Trothyeddha') is a census-designated place (CDP) in Fairbanks North Star Borough, Alaska, United States. It is part of the Fairbanks, Alaska Metropolitan Statistical Area. As of the 2020 census, the population was 11,332, down from 12,964 in 2010. College is the third-most populated CDP (census-designated place) in Alaska.

College is adjacent to the city of Fairbanks. The University of Alaska Fairbanks lies within its boundaries, and serves as its core. The area is often referred to as part of Fairbanks, and not as a separate entity. The area is served by the University of Alaska Fairbanks for fire protection and ambulance service, and jointly by the University of Alaska Fairbanks Police Department and Alaska State Troopers for police protection.

== Geography ==
College is located at 64°50′54″N 147°49′38″W (64.848302, -147.827194).

According to the United States Census Bureau, the CDP has a total area of 19.1 square miles (49 km^{2}), of which 18.7 square miles (48 km^{2}) is land and 0.4 square miles (1.0 km^{2}) (2.15%) is water.

=== Climate ===
According to the Köppen Climate Classification system, College has a subarctic climate, abbreviated "Dfc" on climate maps. The hottest temperature recorded in College was 94 °F (34.4 °C) on June 16, 1969, June 26, 1983, and June 22, 1991, while the coldest temperature recorded was −66 °F (−54.4 °C) on December 28, 1961.

Climate data for College, Alaska, 1991–2020 normals, extremes 1948–present
Month	Jan	Feb	Mar	Apr	May	Jun	Jul	Aug	Sep	Oct	Nov	Dec	Year
Record high °F (°C)	52 (11)	49 (9)	57 (14)	71 (22)	88 (31)	94 (34)	92 (33)	93 (34)	82 (28)	71 (22)	49 (9)	45 (7)	94 (34)
Mean maximum °F (°C)	31.0 (−0.6)	36.3 (2.4)	43.5 (6.4)	60.2 (15.7)	75.4 (24.1)	84.0 (28.9)	84.2 (29.0)	79.3 (26.3)	67.8 (19.9)	53.9 (12.2)	32.4 (0.2)	32.2 (0.1)	86.4 (30.2)
Mean daily maximum °F (°C)	2.2 (−16.6)	12.0 (−11.1)	23.6 (−4.7)	44.0 (6.7)	60.3 (15.7)	70.1 (21.2)	71.3 (21.8)	65.1 (18.4)	53.8 (12.1)	33.2 (0.7)	12.1 (−11.1)	5.0 (−15.0)	37.7 (3.2)
Daily mean °F (°C)	−4.7 (−20.4)	3.3 (−15.9)	12.2 (−11.0)	32.9 (0.5)	48.6 (9.2)	59.0 (15.0)	61.2 (16.2)	55.3 (12.9)	44.1 (6.7)	25.7 (−3.5)	5.6 (−14.7)	−1.5 (−18.6)	28.5 (−2.0)
Mean daily minimum °F (°C)	−11.5 (−24.2)	−5.3 (−20.7)	0.7 (−17.4)	21.7 (−5.7)	36.8 (2.7)	47.9 (8.8)	51.0 (10.6)	45.6 (7.6)	34.5 (1.4)	18.2 (−7.7)	−0.9 (−18.3)	−8.0 (−22.2)	19.2 (−7.1)
Mean minimum °F (°C)	−38.6 (−39.2)	−29.2 (−34.0)	−20.7 (−29.3)	0.0 (−17.8)	24.9 (−3.9)	37.1 (2.8)	41.4 (5.2)	33.6 (0.9)	22.3 (−5.4)	0.3 (−17.6)	−21.5 (−29.7)	−30.3 (−34.6)	−41.7 (−40.9)
Record low °F (°C)	−60 (−51)	−52 (−47)	−40 (−40)	−24 (−31)	3 (−16)	27 (−3)	32 (0)	24 (−4)	5 (−15)	−27 (−33)	−45 (−43)	−66 (−54)	−66 (−54)
Average precipitation inches (mm)	0.66 (17)	0.57 (14)	0.45 (11)	0.37 (9.4)	0.61 (15)	1.92 (49)	2.49 (63)	2.37 (60)	1.56 (40)	0.87 (22)	0.83 (21)	0.64 (16)	13.34 (337.4)
Average snowfall inches (cm)	10.4 (26)	9.9 (25)	7.1 (18)	3.6 (9.1)	0.8 (2.0)	0.0 (0.0)	0.0 (0.0)	0.0 (0.0)	2.3 (5.8)	7.5 (19)	11.2 (28)	11.5 (29)	64.3 (161.9)
Average extreme snow depth inches (cm)	19.8 (50)	23.2 (59)	24.2 (61)	20.7 (53)	2.2 (5.6)	0.0 (0.0)	0.0 (0.0)	0.0 (0.0)	1.8 (4.6)	6.1 (15)	11.5 (29)	16.2 (41)	25.7 (65)
Average precipitation days (≥ 0.01 in)	8.8	7.5	5.7	4.1	6.8	12.1	14.4	16.0	12.3	9.7	9.8	9.0	116.2
Average snowy days (≥ 0.1 in)	10.1	8.5	6.8	3.2	0.7	0.0	0.0	0.0	1.0	8.7	11.3	10.7	61.0
Source 1: NOAA
Source 2: National Weather Service

== Demographics ==
Historical population
Census	Pop.	Note	%±
1930	61		—
1940	234		283.6%
1950	424		81.2%
1960	1,755		313.9%
1970	3,434		95.7%
1980	4,043		17.7%
1990	11,249		178.2%
2000	11,402		1.4%
2010	12,964		13.7%
2020	11,332		−12.6%

College first appeared on the 1930 U.S. Census as an unincorporated village. It was made a census-designated place in 1980.

=== 2020 census ===
As of the 2020 census, College had a population of 11,332. The median age was 35.4 years. 21.5% of residents were under the age of 18 and 13.8% of residents were 65 years of age or older. For every 100 females there were 109.3 males, and for every 100 females age 18 and over there were 109.4 males age 18 and over.

92.9% of residents lived in urban areas, while 7.1% lived in rural areas.

There were 4,495 households in College, of which 30.1% had children under the age of 18 living in them. Of all households, 42.5% were married-couple households, 24.8% were households with a male householder and no spouse or partner present, and 24.7% were households with a female householder and no spouse or partner present. About 31.1% of all households were made up of individuals and 8.5% had someone living alone who was 65 years of age or older.

There were 5,041 housing units, of which 10.8% were vacant. The homeowner vacancy rate was 1.9% and the rental vacancy rate was 10.6%.

Racial composition as of the 2020 census
Race	Number	Percent
White	7,614	67.2%
Black or African American	339	3.0%
American Indian and Alaska Native	1,164	10.3%
Asian	454	4.0%
Native Hawaiian and Other Pacific Islander	44	0.4%
Some other race	201	1.8%
Two or more races	1,516	13.4%
Hispanic or Latino (of any race)	681	6.0%

=== 2000 census ===
At the 2000 census, there were 11,402 people, 4,104 households and 2,638 families residing in the CDP. The population density was 610.7 inhabitants per square mile (235.8/km^{2}). There were 4,501 housing units at an average density of 241.1 per square mile (93.1/km^{2}). The racial makeup of the CDP was 77.9% White, 3.1% Black or African American, 9.0% Native American, 3.2% Asian, 0.1% Pacific Islander, 1.1% from other races, and 5.7% from two or more races. 3.5% of the population were Hispanic or Latino of any race.

There were 4,104 households, of which 37.1% had children under the age of 18 living with them, 48.0% were married couples living together, 11.0% had a female householder with no husband present, and 35.7% were non-families. 25.7% of all households were made up of individuals, and 3.2% had someone living alone who was 65 years of age or older. The average household size was 2.60 and the average family size was 3.13.

26.7% of the population were under the age of 18, 16.8% from 18 to 24, 29.1% from 25 to 44, 22.6% from 45 to 64, and 4.7% who were 65 years of age or older. The median age was 30 years. For every 100 females, there were 107.6 males. For every 100 females age 18 and over, there were 109.2 males.

The median household income was $56,560 and the median family income was $69,969. Males had a median income of $47,126 versus $31,495 for females. The per capita income for the CDP was $23,381. About 4.9% of families and 8.2% of the population were below the poverty line, including 8.2% of those under age 18 and 4.8% of those age 65 or over.

== Education ==
The Fairbanks North Star Borough School District operates the public K-12 schools that serve the CDP, along with the remainder of the borough. The oldest of these is University Park Elementary ("U-Park"), which opened in 1958 along University Avenue. A new school building for U-Park was constructed on Loftus Road during the 1990s; the original school is now used for classrooms by the UAF Community and Technical College. The district operates several other schools within CDP boundaries: along with U-Park, Pearl Creek Elementary, Woodriver Elementary and West Valley High serve attendance areas which include the CDP (middle school students attend Randy Smith Middle and Ryan Middle, located in Fairbanks city limits). Effie Kokrine Charter, Watershed Charter and Hutchison High are also located in the CDP. These schools have open enrollment and are not governed by attendance area boundaries.

The Yukon–Koyukuk School District, which operates public schools in a widely scattered swath of rural Interior Alaska covering much of the nearby Yukon-Koyukuk Census Area, has its headquarters within the CDP boundaries.

The CDP includes the University of Alaska Fairbanks.
