= TVCC =

TVCC may refer to:

- Beijing Television Cultural Center
- Treasure Valley Community College
- Trinity Valley Community College
- Tanana Valley Community College, former name of UAF Community and Technical College
