= Tanaina =

Tanaina may refer to:

- Tanaina, Alaska, a census-designated place
- Dena'ina people, an Alaska Native ethnic group
- Dena'ina language, an Athabascan language of Alaska
