= Chena, Alaska =

Unincorporated community in the state of Alaska, United States

- Ghost Town
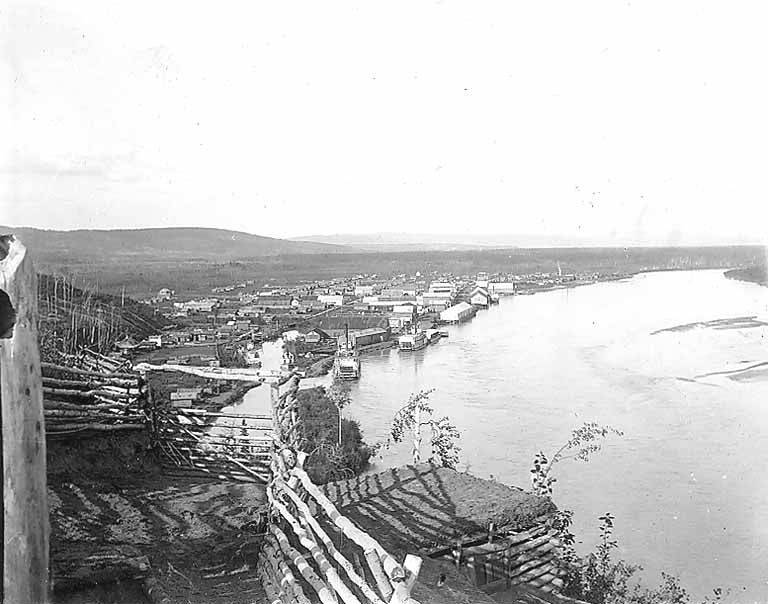
- View of Chena on the Tanana River, 1907

- Location in the U.S. state of Alaska
- Coordinates (USGS GNIS 1893892): 64°47′44″N 147°57′06″W
- Country: United States
- State: Alaska
- Borough: Fairbanks North Star
- Elevation: 430 ft (131 m)
- Time zone: UTC-9 (Alaska (AKST))
  - Summer (DST): UTC-8 (AKDT)
- ZIP code: 99709
- Area code: 907
- GNIS feature ID: 1893892

Chena was a former city in interior Alaska, located in the Fairbanks North Star Borough, Alaska, United States, near the confluence of the Chena and Tanana rivers. It incorporated in 1903 and was disincorporated in 1973. The area is now part of the outskirts of Fairbanks, within the CDP of Chena Ridge. Its heyday was in the first two decades of the 20th century, with a peak population of about 400 in 1907. By 1910 the population had fallen to 138.

The city was fairly prosperous for a time, and even had its own newspaper, the Tanana Miner, which later was purchased by the Fairbanks Daily News (now the Fairbanks Daily News-Miner), running concurrently with it for a time. Other businesses included two hotels, two general stores, a bakery, a laundry, and two restaurants. By 1910, Chena had a police department, a public school, churches, and a fire department. By 1915, however, the population had dropped to 50. With the death of the city's last business owner, grocer Harry Beldon, in 1920, the population had dropped to only 18. The town gradually faded away, resurging in modern times as a suburb of Fairbanks.

The Tanana Valley Railroad had its southern terminus in Chena, but moved its general manager's office to Fairbanks in 1915. There was a pump station to provide water for the hydraulic mining operations on the other side of Chena Ridge, near Ester. The Chena Pump House is now a restaurant and tourist attraction.

== Fairbanks Gold Rush ==
Chena was established and incorporated in 1903, soon after Felix Pedro found gold in Fairbanks in 1902. It was a shipping and mining town on the banks of the Tanana River. Larger ships (probably from the tidewater ports on the Yukon River) transferred cargo to smaller boats at Chena. The smaller boats would then shuttle the cargo to Fairbanks, where the Fairbanks Gold Rush was happening.

In 1905, the Tanana Mines Railway (TMR) opened. It took supplies to the gold mines 20 miles away. The Tanana Mines Railway was refinanced and expanded in 1907 to become the Tanana Valley Railroad (TVRR). The railroad transported supplies to Fairbanks and other mining towns. It made Chena a successful railroad town.

== Competition with Fairbanks ==
Chena competed with Fairbanks for serving the nearby gold mines. Each town wanted to supply the mines because they would make a lot of money.

The Tanana Valley Railroad gave Chena a huge advantage over Fairbanks. It supplied mines in the Chatanika River Valley 43 miles North. The railroad allowed Chena to supply mines that Fairbanks couldn’t realistically serve. Chena thrived as a railroad town. It built a sawmill, power plant, and major dock facilities with warehouses, repair shops, and businesses for the seasonal freight brought by riverboats. A telegraph station was built for the Washington-Alaska Military Cable and Telegraph System (WAMCATS), and connected the continental United States North to Eagle and Nome, Alaska. At its peak, the town had a hospital, school, city hall, dance hall, and 3 newspapers. One of the newspapers, The Tanana Miner, later became the Fairbanks Daily News-Miner.

Chena relied so much on supplying mines and miners that it couldn’t last. The amount of gold in the Tanana Valley declined quickly, so miners left to make money elsewhere. World War I started in 1914, and many miners were sent to fight. This trend continued until there were hardly any people left in Chena. The Tanana Valley Railroad went bankrupt in 1917, and was bought by what is now the Alaska Railroad. The bankruptcy of the Tanana Valley Railroad marks the collapse of the town, but the Chena townsite wasn’t officially cancelled until July 14, 1921.

Fairbanks survived the downturn that came when World War I broke out. In 1903, Judge James Wickersham transferred the Third Judicial District offices to Fairbanks. Additionally, he had the town linked to the new telegraph line from Tanacross to St. Michael. Judge Wickersham also encouraged E. T. Barnette to name the town after the running vice president, Charles Fairbanks. He believed that by doing so, the town would find favor with the vice president in the future. Fairbanks continued to grow and expand into a city during this time, while Chena was solely a mining town. These actions gave Fairbanks an advantage over Chena, and Chena collapsed in 1917 while Fairbanks only faced a setback.

Chena would not formally be disincorporated as a city until 1973, although it had long since been abandoned.

== Ghost town ==
Chena is now a ghost town. For a long time, no one even knew where it was. There are maps of the town from when it was successful, and a Sanborn Fire Insurance map of the commercial buildings. However, there are no surveys that give scale or specific locations. None of the original railroad tracks remain. The buildings were all either destroyed by the Tanana River or repurposed in Fairbanks. Looking at where the town should be, there is no evidence that the town even existed.

Fairbanks North Star Borough surveyor Martin Gutoski was disappointed that there was no clear map of the town, or its location. Chena was never properly surveyed because it had such a short boom-and-bust phase. He did some research, and found what is likely the site of the town. The town is now buried under a century’s worth of silt and dirt, but there is significant evidence that much of it still remains.

== Demographics ==
Historical population
Census	Pop.	Note	%±
1910	138		—
1920	18		−87.0%
U.S. Decennial Census

Chena first appeared on the 1910 U.S. Census as an incorporated city. It appeared once more in 1920, the last time it was returned separately. As of 2010, it now lays within the Chena Ridge CDP (census-designated place).

It is estimated that there were about 2,400 people living in Chena at its peak, around 1907-1908. Because the census data was taken in 1910, it did not reflect the population during that boom.
