= Pleasant Valley, Alaska =

- Census-designated place
- Location within Fairbanks North Star Borough and the state of Alaska
- Coordinates: 64°52′38″N 146°53′2″W
- Country: United States
- State: Alaska
- Borough: Fairbanks North Star

Government
  - Borough mayor: Bryce J. Ward
  - State senator: Robert Myers (R)
  - State rep.: Frank Tomaszewski (R)

Area
  - Total: 31.07 sq mi (80.48 km^{2})
  - Land: 31.07 sq mi (80.48 km^{2})
  - Water: 0 sq mi (0.00 km^{2})
- Elevation: 620 ft (190 m)

Population (2020)
  - Total: 606
  - Density: 19.5/sq mi (7.53/km^{2})
- Time zone: UTC-9 (Alaska (AKST))
  - Summer (DST): UTC-8 (AKDT)
- ZIP code: 99712
- Area code: 907
- FIPS code: 02-61120
- GNIS feature ID: 1866967

Pleasant Valley is a census-designated place (CDP) in Fairbanks North Star Borough, Alaska, United States. It is part of the Fairbanks, Alaska Metropolitan Statistical Area. As of the 2020 census, Pleasant Valley had a population of 606.

== Geography ==
Pleasant Valley is located at 64°52′38″N 146°53′2″W (64.877256, -146.884023), in the valley of the Chena River 28 miles (45 km) east of Fairbanks. It is placed between the hills and is accessible by Chena Hot Springs Road.

According to the United States Census Bureau, the CDP has a total area of 31.1 square miles (80.6 km^{2}), all of it land. Pleasant Valley gets 15 inches (380 mm) of rain per year.

== Demographics ==
Historical population
Census	Pop.	Note	%±
1990	401		—
2000	623		55.4%
2010	725		16.4%
2020	606		−16.4%
U.S. Decennial Census

Pleasant Valley first appeared on the 1990 U.S. Census as a census-designated place (CDP).

As of the census of 2000, there were 623 people, 219 households, and 162 families residing in the CDP. The population density was 7.9 people/km^{2} (20 people/mi^{2}). There were 246 housing units at an average density of 3.1 units/km^{2} (8.0 units/mi^{2}). The racial makeup of the CDP was 87.96% White, 4.82% Native American, 2.09% Asian, 0.32% Pacific Islander, 0.16% from other races, and 4.65% from two or more races. Hispanic or Latino of any race were 2.57% of the population.

There were 219 households, out of which 41.1% had children under the age of 18 living with them, 65.3% were married couples living together, 6.4% had a female householder with no husband present, and 25.6% were non-families. 19.2% of all households were made up of individuals, and 2.3% had someone living alone who was 65 years of age or older. The average household size was 2.84 and the average family size was 3.29.

In the CDP the population was spread out, with 31.0% under the age of 18, 4.8% from 18 to 24, 31.0% from 25 to 44, 30.8% from 45 to 64, and 2.4% who were 65 years of age or older. The median age was 36 years. For every 100 females there were 109.1 males. For every 100 females age 18 and over, there were 100.9 males.

The median income for a household in the CDP was $49,464, and the median income for a family was $41,719. Males had a median income of $50,750 versus $22,969 for females. The per capita income for the CDP was $18,633. About 10.1% of families and 7.0% of the population were below the poverty line, including 7.4% of those under age 18 and none of those age 65 or over.
