= Meadow Lakes, Alaska =

- CDP
- Location in Matanuska-Susitna Borough and the state of Alaska

- Location within the state of Alaska
- Coordinates: 61°35′59″N 149°36′58″W
- Country: United States
- State: Alaska
- Borough: Matanuska-Susitna

Government
  - Borough mayor: Edna DeVries
  - State senators: Shelley Hughes (R); Mike Shower (R); David Wilson (R)
  - State reps.: David Eastman (R); Kevin McCabe (R); Jesse Sumner (R); Cathy Tilton (R)

Area
  - Total: 78.64 sq mi (203.67 km^{2})
  - Land: 75.44 sq mi (195.40 km^{2})
  - Water: 3.19 sq mi (8.27 km^{2})
- Elevation: 377 ft (115 m)

Population (2020)
  - Total: 9,197
  - Density: 121.9/sq mi (47.07/km^{2})
- Time zone: UTC-9 (Alaska (AKST))
  - Summer (DST): UTC-8 (AKDT)
- Area code: 907
- FIPS code: 02-47735
- GNIS feature ID: 1866961

Meadow Lakes is a census-designated place (CDP) in Matanuska-Susitna Borough, Alaska, United States. Located west of Wasilla, it is part of the Anchorage, Alaska Metropolitan Statistical Area. As of the 2020 census, the population was 9,197, up from 7,570 in 2010. It is the fifth-most populated CDP in Alaska and the third largest community in the borough.

== Geography ==
Meadow Lakes is located at 61°35′59″N 149°36′58″W (61.599661, -149.616036).

According to the United States Census Bureau, as of 2020, the CDP has a total area of 78.64 square miles (203.7 km^{2}), of which, 75.44 square miles (195.4 km^{2}) of it is land and 3.20 square miles (8.3 km^{2}) of it (4.07%) is water.

== Demographics ==
Historical population
Census	Pop.	Note	%±
1990	2,374		—
2000	4,819		103.0%
2010	7,570		57.1%
2020	9,197		21.5%
U.S. Decennial Census

Meadow Lakes first reported on the 1990 U.S. Census as a census-designated place (CDP).

=== 2020 census ===
As of the 2020 census, Meadow Lakes had a population of 9,197. The median age was 35.4 years. 27.7% of residents were under the age of 18 and 12.2% of residents were 65 years of age or older. For every 100 females there were 108.2 males, and for every 100 females age 18 and over there were 107.3 males age 18 and over.

4.6% of residents lived in urban areas, while 95.4% lived in rural areas.

There were 3,320 households in Meadow Lakes, of which 34.7% had children under the age of 18 living in them. Of all households, 52.3% were married-couple households, 21.1% were households with a male householder and no spouse or partner present, and 17.1% were households with a female householder and no spouse or partner present. About 22.8% of all households were made up of individuals and 7.3% had someone living alone who was 65 years of age or older.

There were 3,982 housing units, of which 16.6% were vacant. The homeowner vacancy rate was 3.2% and the rental vacancy rate was 9.3%.

Racial composition as of the 2020 census
Race	Number	Percent
White	7,095	77.1%
Black or African American	108	1.2%
American Indian and Alaska Native	571	6.2%
Asian	139	1.5%
Native Hawaiian and Other Pacific Islander	36	0.4%
Some other race	138	1.5%
Two or more races	1,110	12.1%
Hispanic or Latino (of any race)	457	5.0%

=== 2000 census ===
As of the census of 2000, there were 4,819 people, 1,702 households, and 1,215 families residing in the CDP. The population density was 72.0 inhabitants per square mile (27.8/km^{2}). There were 2,003 housing units at an average density of 29.9 per square mile (11.5/km^{2}). The racial makeup of the CDP was 87.9% White, 0.5% Black or African American, 5.4% Native American, 0.6% Asian, 0.2% Pacific Islander, 0.6% from other races, and 4.8% from two or more races. 3.0% of the population were Hispanic or Latino of any race.

There were 1,702 households, out of which 42.5% had children under the age of 18 living with them, 55.1% were married couples living together, 9.2% had a female householder with no husband present, and 28.6% were non-families. 20.9% of all households were made up of individuals, and 3.3% had someone living alone who was 65 years of age or older. The average household size was 2.83 and the average family size was 3.30.

In the CDP, the population was spread out, with 33.4% under the age of 18, 7.1% from 18 to 24, 32.5% from 25 to 44, 22.2% from 45 to 64, and 4.9% who were 65 years of age or older. The median age was 33 years. For every 100 females, there were 113.8 males. For every 100 females age 18 and over, there were 111.5 males.

The median income for a household in the CDP was $41,030, and the median income for a family was $47,534. Males had a median income of $40,948 versus $26,148 for females. The per capita income for the CDP was $17,295. About 12.3% of families and 17.1% of the population were below the poverty line, including 23.7% of those under age 18 and 5.0% of those age 65 or over.
