= Silver Gulch Brewing & Bottling Company =

Brewery in Alaska, U.S.

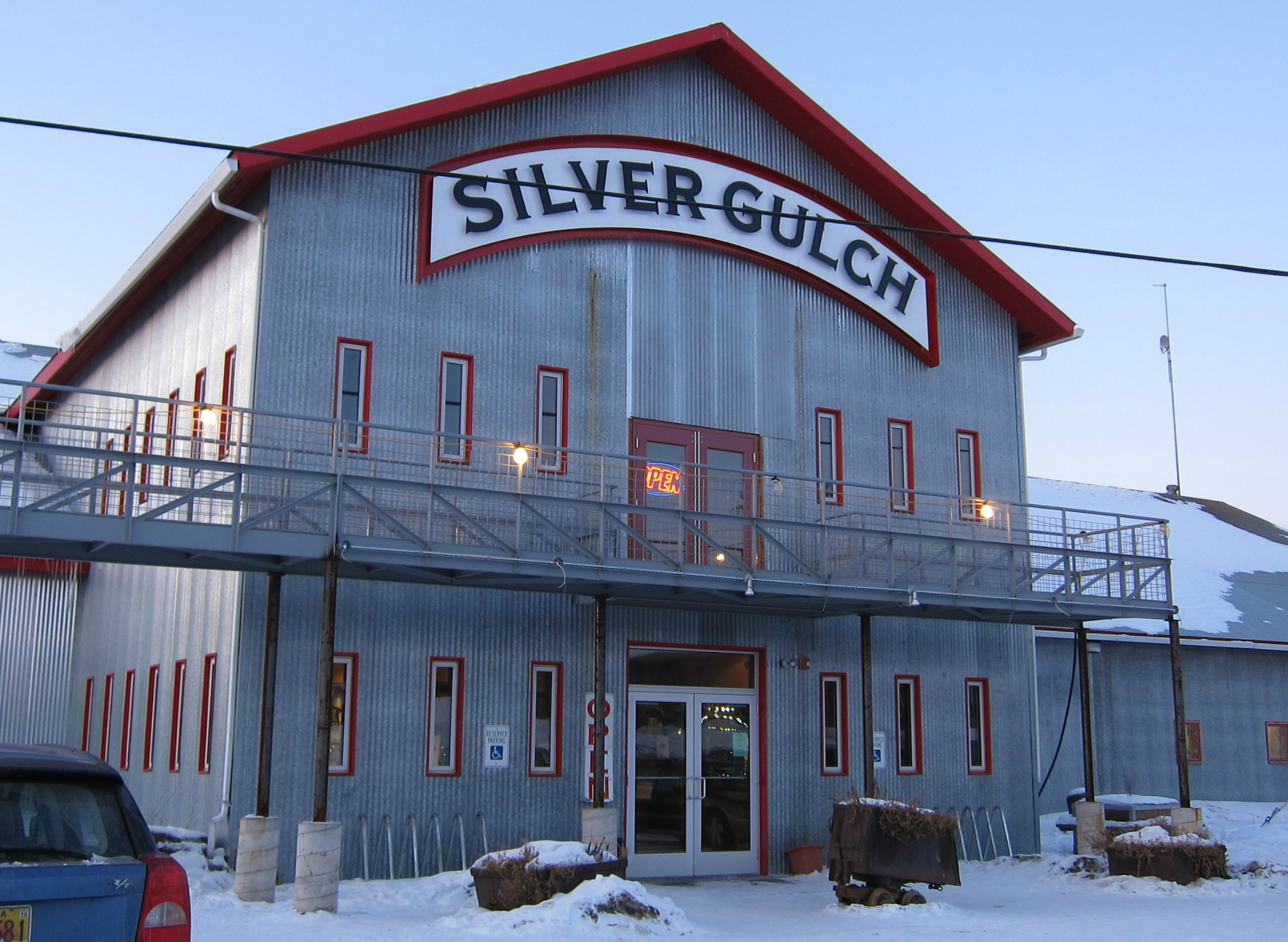
- Industry: Alcoholic beverage
- Founded: 1998
- Headquarters: Fox, Alaska, United States
- Products: Beer
- Production output: 4,000 bbls
- Owner: Glenn Brady
- Website: www.silvergulch.com

Silver Gulch Brewing & Bottling Company is a brewery in Alaska, United States. It was founded in 1998 in Fox, Alaska, outside Fairbanks. It is one of approximately 30 breweries in the state, despite Alaska's small population and preponderance of dry communities. It is also the most northerly brewery in America, located only a few degrees south of the Arctic Circle. The company's brewing vessels were acquired from the defunct Conners Brewery in St. Catharines, Ontario.

In December 2012, the brewery opened a retail outlet at the Ted Stevens Anchorage International Airport.

In July 2026, the brewery filed for Chapter 11 bankruptcy protection.
