= Salcha seismic zone =

Geologic feature in Alaska, United States

Salcha Seismic Zone
- Etymology: Salcha, Alaska
- Location: Alaska, United States
- Coordinates: 64.5°N 147.0°W

Characteristics
- Length: 65 km (40 mi)

Tectonics
- Plate: North American plate
- Status: Active
- Earthquakes: 1937, 2024

The Salcha seismic zone is a fault line in the Interior region of Alaska, United States, generally located to the east of Fairbanks. The fault runs for 65 km (40 mi) from the northern edge of the Alaska Range across the Tanana Valley to the southern end of the Yukon–Tanana Uplands and is parallel to the Fairbanks and Minto Seismic Zones located further west. The fault associated with the Salcha seismic zone is not exposed at the surface, but reaches to within a few kilometers of the top of the crust. It underlies the community of Salcha, Alaska, from which it takes its name.

Linear southwest to northeast trending faults in this region, like the Salcha seismic zone, are believed to have formed as a result of tension created by the Denali Fault south of the Tanana Valley and the Tintina Fault to the north. Stresses created by these features results in clockwise rotation of the crust underlying the Tanana Valley including Fairbanks, North Pole, and Salcha. The strain has been observed as being less than 1 mm (0.039 in) per year on the north-south axis but as much as 2 mm (0.079 in) per year on the east-west axis. The fault is overlain by Tanana Basin sediment dating from the Miocene and younger.

Earthquakes are common along the seismic zone. The strongest earthquake known to have originated from it was a M7.1 that occurred on July 22, 1937. Other large earthquakes include a M4.9 in 2021, and M5.3 in 2024. The 1937 earthquake likely ruptured the entire length of the fault while the 2024 earthquake was observed as originating from a depth of only 7.2 km (4.5 mi). The combination of the Salcha, Fairbanks, and Minto seismic zones generate thousands of small earthquakes each year. A series of mounds on the Salcha River floodplain may have been created by tectonic processes associated with the seismic zone.
