= Chena Ridge, Alaska =

Coordinates: 64°49′54″N 147°55′42″W

Chena Ridge, Alaska Khotughee'oden
- CDP
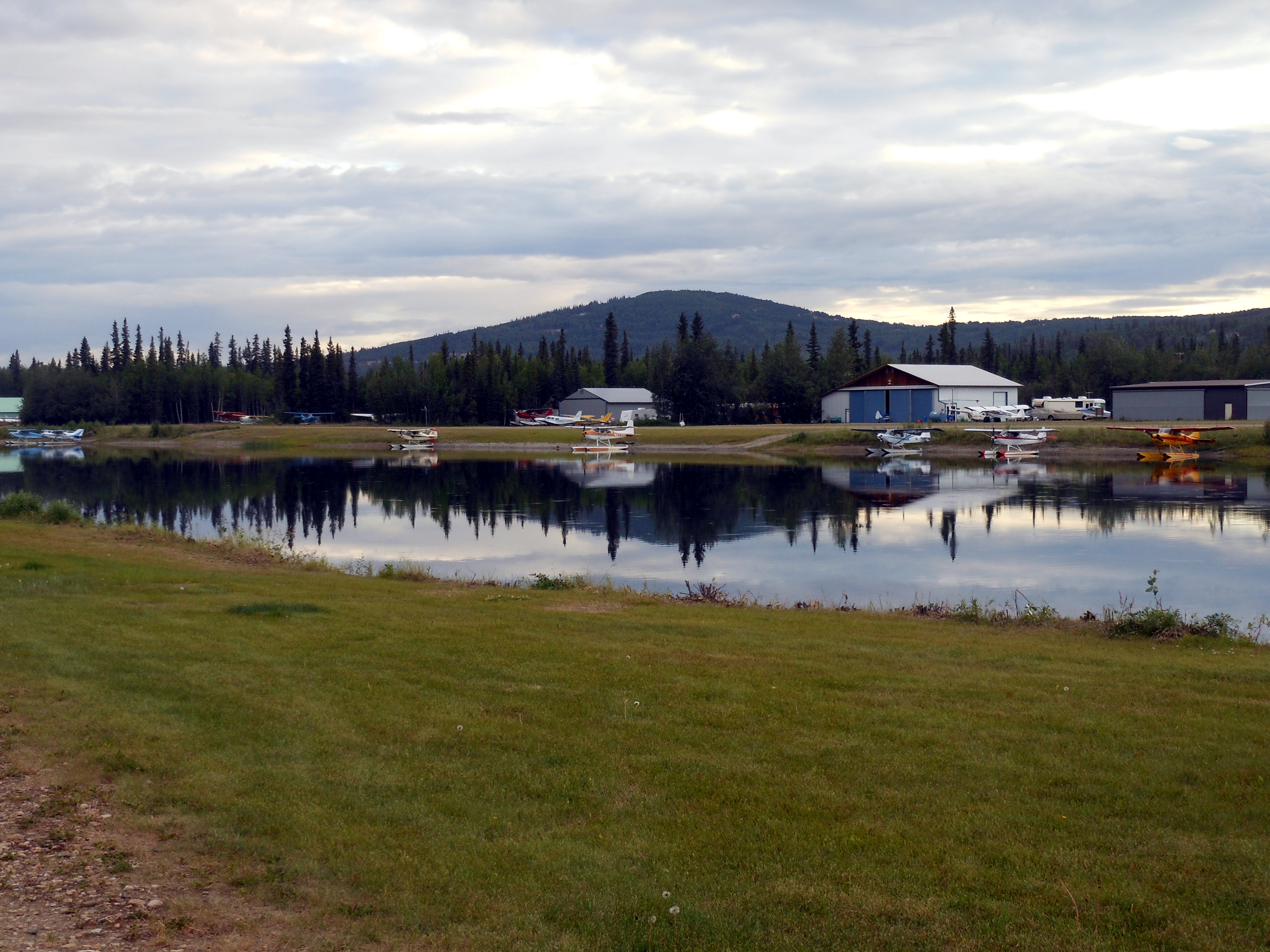
- Chena Marina Airport, a floatplane base in Chena Ridge, west across the Chena River from Fairbanks International Airport (2013)

- Location within Fairbanks North Star Borough and the U.S. state of Alaska
- Country: United States
- State: Alaska
- Borough: Fairbanks North Star

Government
  - Borough mayor: Grier Hopkins
  - State senator: Mike Cronk (R)
  - State rep.: Ashley Carrick (D)

Area
  - Total: 36.86 sq mi (95.47 km^{2})
  - Land: 36.45 sq mi (94.41 km^{2})
  - Water: 0.41 sq mi (1.05 km^{2})

Population (2020)
  - Total: 6,015
  - Density: 165.0/sq mi (63.71/km^{2})
- Time zone: UTC−9 (AKST)
  - Summer (DST): UTC−8 (AKDT)
- FIPS code: 02-12920

Chena Ridge (Lower Tanana: Khotughee'oden) is a census-designated place (CDP) in Fairbanks North Star Borough, Alaska, United States. It is the location of the former city (1903–73) of Chena, now a ghost town that once rivaled nearby Fairbanks in importance.

One of the new CDPs created in 2010 in Alaska, Chena Ridge is now a western suburb of Fairbanks, located between the George Parks Highway and the Tanana River.

As of the 2020 Census, the population was 6,015, up from 5,791 in 2010. Chena Ridge is the ninth-most populated CDP in Alaska.

== Demographics ==
Historical population
Census	Pop.	Note	%±
2010	5,791		—
2020	6,015		3.9%
U.S. Decennial Census

=== 2020 census ===
As of the 2020 census, Chena Ridge had a population of 6,015. The median age was 38.4 years. 23.3% of residents were under the age of 18 and 12.9% of residents were 65 years of age or older. For every 100 females there were 110.5 males, and for every 100 females age 18 and over there were 111.5 males age 18 and over.

38.7% of residents lived in urban areas, while 61.3% lived in rural areas.

There were 2,419 households in Chena Ridge, of which 29.3% had children under the age of 18 living in them. Of all households, 53.6% were married-couple households, 22.8% were households with a male householder and no spouse or partner present, and 15.8% were households with a female householder and no spouse or partner present. About 28.3% of all households were made up of individuals and 5.8% had someone living alone who was 65 years of age or older.

There were 2,747 housing units, of which 11.9% were vacant. The homeowner vacancy rate was 2.2% and the rental vacancy rate was 11.6%.

Racial composition as of the 2020 census
Race	Number	Percent
White	4,670	77.6%
Black or African American	79	1.3%
American Indian and Alaska Native	453	7.5%
Asian	116	1.9%
Native Hawaiian and Other Pacific Islander	2	0.0%
Some other race	73	1.2%
Two or more races	622	10.3%
Hispanic or Latino (of any race)	229	3.8%

=== 2010 census ===
Chena Ridge first appeared on the 2010 U.S. Census as a census-designated place (CDP). The population density was 158.8 people per square mile.

The racial makeup of the place was 74.8% White, 1.4% Black or African American, 10.6% Native American or Alaska Native, 1.1% Asian, 0.0%, Pacific Islander and 8.8% two or more races. In addition, 4.6% of the population identified as Hispanic or Latino.
