= Joy Cottle =

American politician

Member-elect of the Alaska House of Representatives from the 34th district
- Assuming office January 2027
- Succeeding: Frank Tomaszewski

Personal details
- Born: Nome, Alaska, U.S.
- Party: Independent
- Education: University of Alaska Fairbanks

Joy Beth Cottle is an American politician. An independent, she is the member-elect for the 34th district of the Alaska House of Representatives.

Cottle was born in Nome, Alaska. She attended and graduated from Delta Junction Alternative School. After graduating, she attended the University of Alaska Fairbanks, earning her associate's degree in 2001 and her bachelor's degree in 2007. She worked as a firefighter and paramedic.
