= Goldstream, Alaska =

Goldstream, Alaska Khudodleeneek'a
- CDP
- Location within Fairbanks North Star Borough and the state of Alaska
- Coordinates: 64°57′14″N 147°37′42″W
- Country: United States
- State: Alaska
- Borough: Fairbanks North Star

Government
  - Borough mayor: Bryce J. Ward
  - State senator: Click Bishop (R)
  - State reps.: Ashley Carrick (D); Mike Cronk (R)

Area
  - Total: 86.04 sq mi (222.83 km^{2})
  - Land: 86.00 sq mi (222.74 km^{2})
  - Water: 0.039 sq mi (0.10 km^{2})

Population (2020)
  - Total: 3,299
  - Density: 38.4/sq mi (14.81/km^{2})
- Time zone: UTC-9 (Alaska (AKST))
  - Summer (DST): UTC-8 (AKDT)
- FIPS code: 02-29130

Goldstream, Alaska (colloquially the Goldstream Valley) (Lower Tanana: Khudodleeneek'a) is a census-designated place (CDP) in Alaska, United States. It is part of the Fairbanks, Alaska Metropolitan Statistical Area. As of the 2020 census, Goldstream had a population of 3,299.

== Climate ==
Climate data for Goldstream Creek, Alaska, 1991–2020 normals, 2009–2024 extremes: 577ft (176m)
Month	Jan	Feb	Mar	Apr	May	Jun	Jul	Aug	Sep	Oct	Nov	Dec	Year
Record high °F (°C)	40 (4)	38 (3)	54 (12)	69 (21)	85 (29)	90 (32)	87 (31)	90 (32)	73 (23)	66 (19)	44 (7)	39 (4)	90 (32)
Mean maximum °F (°C)	26.6 (−3.0)	29.4 (−1.4)	41.7 (5.4)	57.5 (14.2)	76.6 (24.8)	82.4 (28.0)	83.1 (28.4)	78.9 (26.1)	67.2 (19.6)	52.9 (11.6)	30.6 (−0.8)	28.2 (−2.1)	79.0 (26.1)
Mean daily maximum °F (°C)	−2.3 (−19.1)	10.0 (−12.2)	24.2 (−4.3)	44.1 (6.7)	59.9 (15.5)	69.8 (21.0)	70.7 (21.5)	64.0 (17.8)	53.0 (11.7)	32.4 (0.2)	9.2 (−12.7)	1.4 (−17.0)	36.4 (2.4)
Daily mean °F (°C)	−10.4 (−23.6)	−1.1 (−18.4)	7.8 (−13.4)	28.9 (−1.7)	44.5 (6.9)	55.3 (12.9)	57.5 (14.2)	51.5 (10.8)	40.7 (4.8)	22.7 (−5.2)	0.9 (−17.3)	−6.6 (−21.4)	24.3 (−4.3)
Mean daily minimum °F (°C)	−18.5 (−28.1)	−12.2 (−24.6)	−8.7 (−22.6)	13.7 (−10.2)	29.0 (−1.7)	40.8 (4.9)	44.3 (6.8)	39.0 (3.9)	28.4 (−2.0)	13.0 (−10.6)	−7.4 (−21.9)	−14.5 (−25.8)	12.2 (−11.0)
Mean minimum °F (°C)	−42.0 (−41.1)	−39.1 (−39.5)	−33.1 (−36.2)	−9.9 (−23.3)	18.6 (−7.4)	29.2 (−1.6)	33.2 (0.7)	28.4 (−2.0)	15.4 (−9.2)	−5.1 (−20.6)	−28.1 (−33.4)	−35.3 (−37.4)	−44.2 (−42.3)
Record low °F (°C)	−55 (−48)	−53 (−47)	−45 (−43)	−35 (−37)	10 (−12)	23 (−5)	27 (−3)	23 (−5)	−1 (−18)	−17 (−27)	−40 (−40)	−47 (−44)	−55 (−48)
Average precipitation inches (mm)	0.64 (16)	0.51 (13)	0.45 (11)	0.36 (9.1)	0.71 (18)	1.99 (51)	2.74 (70)	2.87 (73)	1.61 (41)	0.87 (22)	0.95 (24)	0.59 (15)	14.29 (363.1)
Average snowfall inches (cm)	6.4 (16)	12.7 (32)	7.0 (18)	4.1 (10)	0.2 (0.51)	0.0 (0.0)	0.0 (0.0)	0.0 (0.0)	1.8 (4.6)	4.7 (12)	13.7 (35)	13.6 (35)	64.2 (163.11)
Source 1: NOAA
Source 2: XMACIS2 (records, monthly max/mins & 2010-2023 snowfall)

== Demographics ==
Historical population
Census	Pop.	Note	%±
2010	3,557		—
2020	3,299		−7.3%
U.S. Decennial Census

=== 2020 census ===
As of the 2020 census, Goldstream had a population of 3,299. The median age was 41.7 years. 19.9% of residents were under the age of 18 and 14.8% of residents were 65 years of age or older. For every 100 females there were 109.7 males, and for every 100 females age 18 and over there were 109.4 males age 18 and over.

0.0% of residents lived in urban areas, while 100.0% lived in rural areas.

There were 1,511 households in Goldstream, of which 23.3% had children under the age of 18 living in them. Of all households, 45.7% were married-couple households, 26.1% were households with a male householder and no spouse or partner present, and 20.2% were households with a female householder and no spouse or partner present. About 36.5% of all households were made up of individuals and 9.4% had someone living alone who was 65 years of age or older.

There were 1,854 housing units, of which 18.5% were vacant. The homeowner vacancy rate was 1.6% and the rental vacancy rate was 12.1%.

Racial composition as of the 2020 census
Race	Number	Percent
White	2,684	81.4%
Black or African American	34	1.0%
American Indian and Alaska Native	147	4.5%
Asian	39	1.2%
Native Hawaiian and Other Pacific Islander	4	0.1%
Some other race	50	1.5%
Two or more races	341	10.3%
Hispanic or Latino (of any race)	117	3.5%

=== 2010 census ===
As of the census of 2010, there were 3,557 people, 1,579 households, and 884 families residing in the CDP. There were 1,837 housing units. The racial makeup of the CDP was 89% White, 0.6% Black or African American, 3.4% Native American, 0.7% Asian, 0.0% Pacific Islander, 0.7% from other races, and 5.5% from two or more races. 2.5% of the population were Hispanic or Latino of any race.

== See also ==
- Fox, Alaska
- Steele Creek, Alaska
