= Salcha, Alaska =

Salcha, Alaska Soł Chaget, Saagescheeg
- Census-designated place
- Salcha Store & Service

- Location within Fairbanks North Star Borough and the state of Alaska
- Coordinates: 64°31′16″N 146°58′50″W
- Country: United States
- State: Alaska
- Borough: Fairbanks North Star

Government
  - Borough mayor. = Buckminster Fuller: Bryce J. Ward
  - State senator: Robert Myers (R)
  - State rep.: Frank Tomaszewski (R)

Area
  - Total: 77.06 sq mi (199.58 km^{2})
  - Land: 75.28 sq mi (194.98 km^{2})
  - Water: 1.78 sq mi (4.60 km^{2})
- Elevation: 650 ft (200 m)

Population (2020)
  - Total: 977
  - Density: 13.0/sq mi (5.01/km^{2})
- Time zone: UTC-9 (Alaska (AKST))
  - Summer (DST): UTC-8 (AKDT)
- ZIP code: 99714
- Area code: 907
- FIPS code: 02-66550

Salcha (Lower Tanana: Soł Chaget, Tanacross: Saagescheeg) is a census-designated place (CDP) in Fairbanks North Star Borough in the U.S. state of Alaska. It is part of the Fairbanks, Alaska Metropolitan Statistical Area. As of the 2020 census, Salcha had a population of 977.

== Geography ==
Salcha is located at 64°31′14″N 147°0′41″W (64.520455, -147.011452). The village was first reported in 1898 by the U.S. Geological Survey as "Salchaket", deriving from the Tanana name Soł Chaget meaning "the mouth of Salcha". It is about 40 miles (64 km) south of Fairbanks on the Richardson Highway. It is next to the Salcha River, a popular fishing destination. It is also next to the Tanana River. Salcha has its own post office. The ZIP code for Salcha is 99714. The Salcha Seismic Zone underlies the community.

According to the United States Census Bureau, the CDP has a total area of 75.9 square miles (196.7 km^{2}), of which 74.0 square miles (191.6 km^{2}) is land and 2.0 square miles (5.1 km^{2}), or 2.59%, is water.

== Climate ==
Salcha has a dry-winter continental subarctic climate (Köppen Dwc).

Climate data for Salcha
Month	Jan	Feb	Mar	Apr	May	Jun	Jul	Aug	Sep	Oct	Nov	Dec	Year
Record high °F (°C)	56 (13)	50 (10)	56 (13)	76 (24)	84 (29)	92 (33)	90 (32)	90 (32)	74 (23)	62 (17)	51 (11)	49 (9)	92 (33)
Mean daily maximum °F (°C)	4.1 (−15.5)	12.6 (−10.8)	25.8 (−3.4)	43.7 (6.5)	60.7 (15.9)	69.5 (20.8)	71.1 (21.7)	65.5 (18.6)	54.2 (12.3)	31.2 (−0.4)	14.7 (−9.6)	5.1 (−14.9)	38.2 (3.4)
Mean daily minimum °F (°C)	−13.7 (−25.4)	−9.7 (−23.2)	−2.7 (−19.3)	17.3 (−8.2)	33 (1)	44.6 (7.0)	48.2 (9.0)	43.3 (6.3)	33.1 (0.6)	15.4 (−9.2)	−2.4 (−19.1)	−12.7 (−24.8)	16.1 (−8.8)
Record low °F (°C)	−65 (−54)	−57 (−49)	−49 (−45)	−32 (−36)	12 (−11)	30 (−1)	31 (−1)	15 (−9)	−2 (−19)	−37 (−38)	−37 (−38)	−59 (−51)	−65 (−54)
Average precipitation inches (mm)	0.43 (11)	0.37 (9.4)	0.22 (5.6)	0.24 (6.1)	0.89 (23)	2.37 (60)	2.99 (76)	2.19 (56)	1.28 (33)	0.94 (24)	0.54 (14)	0.54 (14)	13.01 (330)
Average snowfall inches (cm)	7.9 (20)	6 (15)	4.7 (12)	2.9 (7.4)	0.9 (2.3)	0 (0)	0 (0)	0 (0)	1.1 (2.8)	11.4 (29)	9.6 (24)	10 (25)	54.6 (139)
Average precipitation days	6	5	4	4	8	12	14	13	10	9	8	7	100

== Demographics ==
Historical population
Census	Pop.	Note	%±
1980	319		—
1990	354		11.0%
2000	854		141.2%
2010	1,095		28.2%
2020	977		−10.8%
U.S. Decennial Census

Salcha first appeared on the 1980 U.S. Census as a census-designated place (CDP).

As of the census of 2000, there were 854 people, 317 households, and 224 families residing in the CDP. The population density was 11.9 inhabitants per square mile (4.6/km^{2}). There were 388 housing units at an average density of 5.4 per square mile (2.1/km^{2}). The racial makeup of the CDP was 87.82% White, 1.64% Black or African American, 3.86% Native American, 0.94% Asian, 0.23% Pacific Islander, 1.29% from other races, and 4.22% from two or more races. 2.81% of the population were Hispanic or Latino of any race.

There were 317 households, out of which 36.0% had children under the age of 18 living with them, 59.3% were married couples living together, 8.2% had a female householder with no husband present, and 29.3% were non-families. 21.5% of all households were made up of individuals, and 3.5% had someone living alone who was 65 years of age or older. The average household size was 2.69 and the average family size was 3.16.

In the CDP, the population was spread out, with 29.6% under the age of 18, 5.9% from 18 to 24, 29.6% from 25 to 44, 28.6% from 45 to 64, and 6.3% who were 65 years of age or older. The median age was 38 years. For every 100 females, there were 111.4 males. For every 100 females age 18 and over, there were 115.4 males.

The median income for a household in the CDP was $54,063, and the median income for a family was $61,563. Males had a median income of $42,863 versus $26,071 for females. The per capita income for the CDP was $22,616. None of the families and 3.9% of the population were living below the poverty line, including no under eighteens and none of those over 64.
