= UAF Community and Technical College =

Community college in Alaska, United States

Coordinates: 64°50′27.5″N 147°43′34.8″W

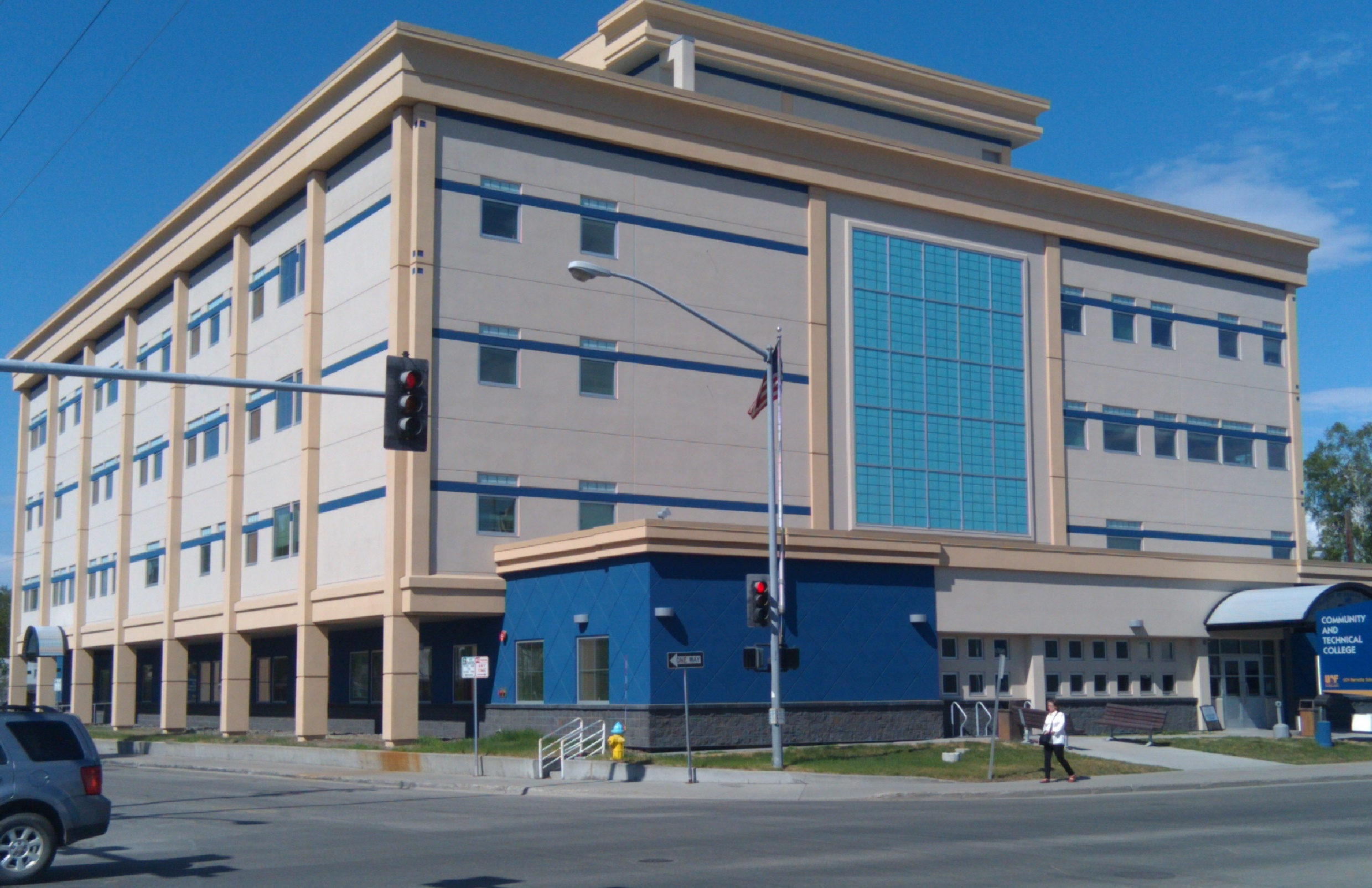
UAF CTC main classroom building in downtown Fairbanks.

The UAF Community and Technical College (CTC), formerly Tanana Valley Campus (TVC) is located in Fairbanks, Alaska. CTC is a major academic division of the University of Alaska Fairbanks, offering classes and curriculum normally associated with community colleges. CTC is primarily focused on career and technical education. Many one year certificate and two year associate degree programs are offered. 2,554 students were enrolled in 1997 and 3,294 students in 2004.

The school was founded in 1974 as Tanana Valley Community College. It was much newer than most other community colleges in Alaska at the time, owing to the long existence of the University of Alaska main campus in nearby College and the comparative lack of higher education facilities elsewhere in the state. This would change shortly when the University of Alaska System was created, with three main campuses (UAA, UAF and UAJ). The community college system in Alaska was integrated with the main campuses in the late 1980s. The school was renamed in 2010 to emphasize its purpose and connection to parent school UAF. The former name reflected its roots as TVCC, as well as its location in the Tanana Valley.
