= Tanaina, Alaska =

- CDP
- Location in Matanuska-Susitna Borough and the state of Alaska

- Location within the state of Alaska
- Coordinates: 61°37′27″N 149°25′58″W
- Country: United States
- State: Alaska
- Borough: Matanuska-Susitna

Government
  - Borough mayor: Edna DeVries
  - State senators: Mike Shower (R); David Wilson (R)
  - State reps.: Kevin McCabe (R); George Rauscher (R); Jesse Sumner (R)

Area
  - Total: 30.83 sq mi (79.85 km^{2})
  - Land: 30.31 sq mi (78.50 km^{2})
  - Water: 0.52 sq mi (1.35 km^{2})
- Elevation: 499 ft (152 m)

Population (2020)
  - Total: 8,817
  - Density: 290.9/sq mi (112.32/km^{2})
- Time zone: UTC-9 (Alaska (AKST))
  - Summer (DST): UTC-8 (AKDT)
- ZIP code: 99654
- Area code: 907
- FIPS code: 02-75077
- GNIS feature ID: 1865567

Tanaina is a census-designated place (CDP) in the Matanuska-Susitna Borough in the U.S. state of Alaska. Located 4 miles north from Wasilla, it is part of the Anchorage, Alaska Metropolitan Statistical Area. At the 2020 census the population was 8,817, up from 8,197 in 2010. Tanaina is the sixth-most populated CDP in Alaska.

== Geography ==
Tanaina is located at 61°37′27″N 149°25′58″W (61.624211, -149.432817).

According to the United States Census Bureau, the CDP has a total area of 27.5 square miles (71 km^{2}), of which, 27.1 square miles (70 km^{2}) of it is land and 0.4 square miles (1.0 km^{2}) of it (1.53%) is water.

== Demographics ==
Historical population
Census	Pop.	Note	%±
2000	4,993		—
2010	8,197		64.2%
2020	8,817		7.6%
U.S. Decennial Census

Tanaina first appeared on the 2000 U.S. Census as a census-designated place (CDP).

=== 2020 census ===
As of the 2020 census, Tanaina had a population of 8,817. The median age was 33.8 years. 29.3% of residents were under the age of 18 and 10.7% of residents were 65 years of age or older. For every 100 females there were 101.4 males, and for every 100 females age 18 and over there were 100.8 males age 18 and over.

77.7% of residents lived in urban areas, while 22.3% lived in rural areas.

There were 2,999 households in Tanaina, of which 39.7% had children under the age of 18 living in them. Of all households, 55.2% were married-couple households, 18.5% were households with a male householder and no spouse or partner present, and 18.8% were households with a female householder and no spouse or partner present. About 21.0% of all households were made up of individuals and 6.0% had someone living alone who was 65 years of age or older.

There were 3,225 housing units, of which 7.0% were vacant. The homeowner vacancy rate was 1.6% and the rental vacancy rate was 8.5%.

Racial composition as of the 2020 census
Race	Number	Percent
White	6,949	78.8%
Black or African American	56	0.6%
American Indian and Alaska Native	466	5.3%
Asian	97	1.1%
Native Hawaiian and Other Pacific Islander	27	0.3%
Some other race	162	1.8%
Two or more races	1,060	12.0%
Hispanic or Latino (of any race)	487	5.5%

=== 2000 census ===
As of the census of 2000, there were 4,993 people, 1,609 households, and 1,266 families residing in the CDP. The population density was 184.3 inhabitants per square mile (71.2/km^{2}). There were 1,700 housing units at an average density of 62.7 per square mile (24.2/km^{2}). The racial makeup of the CDP was 87.9% White, 0.5% Black or African American, 4.7% Native American, 0.6% Asian, <0.1% Pacific Islander, 1.4% from other races, and 4.9% from two or more races. 3.4% of the population were Hispanic or Latino of any race.

There were 1,609 households, out of which 49.9% had children under the age of 18 living with them, 65.9% were married couples living together, 8.6% had a female householder with no husband present, and 21.3% were non-families. 14.9% of all households were made up of individuals, and 1.9% had someone living alone who was 65 years of age or older. The average household size was 3.10 and the average family size was 3.46.

In the CDP, the population was spread out, with 35.8% under the age of 18, 7.3% from 18 to 24, 32.9% from 25 to 44, 20.9% from 45 to 64, and 3.1% who were 65 years of age or older. The median age was 32 years. For every 100 females, there were 107.5 males. For every 100 females age 18 and over, there were 105.2 males.

The median income for a household in the CDP was $64,491, and the median income for a family was $71,629. Males had a median income of $47,917 versus $30,474 for females. The per capita income for the CDP was $23,967. About 6.1% of families and 7.5% of the population were below the poverty line, including 8.6% of those under age 18 and none of those age 65 or over.

=== Demographic estimates ===
Tanaina's median household income rose to $76,114 in 2010–2014, according to the 2010–2014 American Community Survey.
