= Badger, Alaska =

Coordinates: 64°48′19″N 147°24′37″W

- CDP
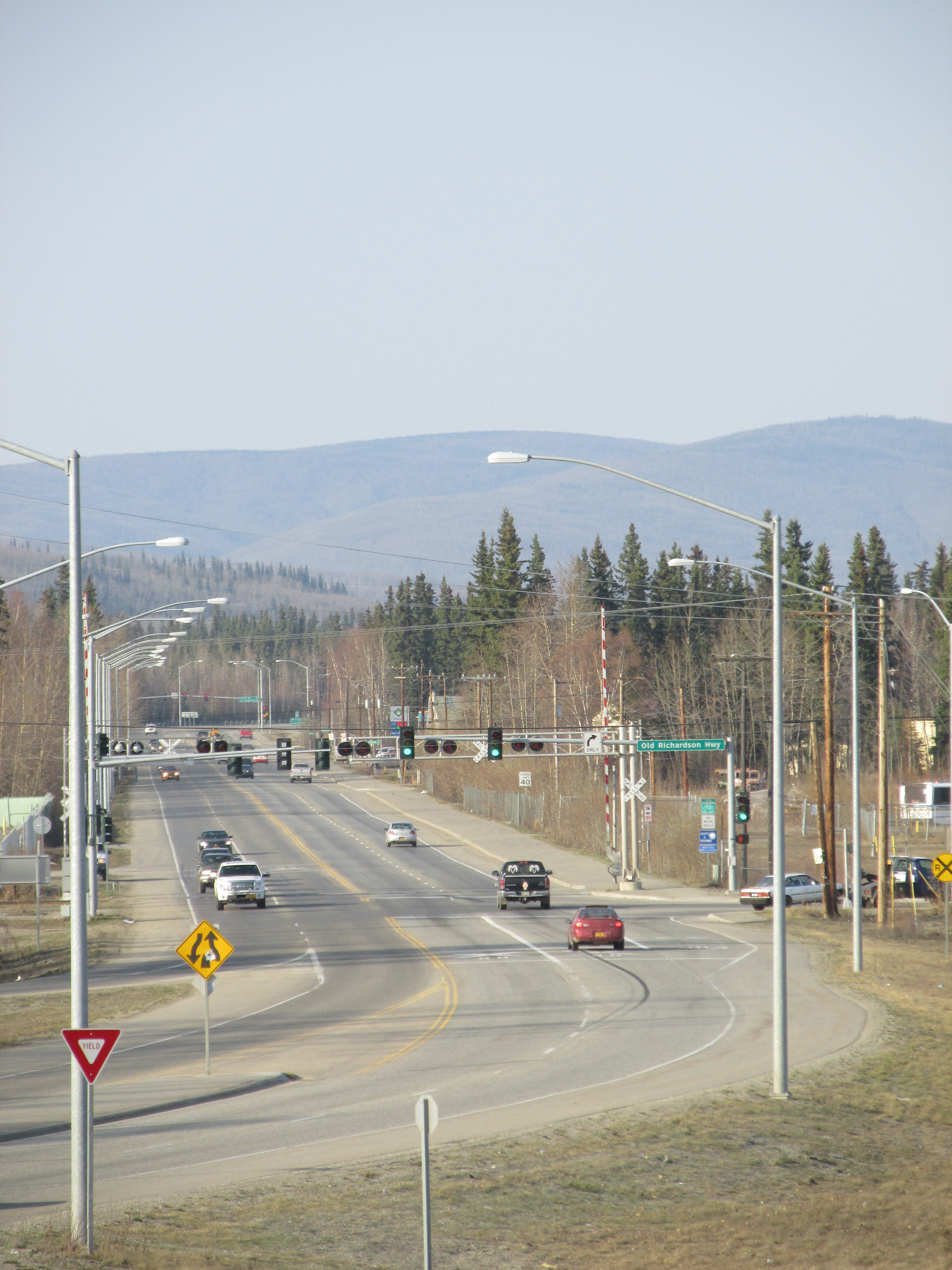
- Badger Road is a side road of the Richardson Highway between Fairbanks and North Pole and provides primary access to the majority of the CDP. The Fairbanks end is viewed from the Richardson Highway overpass.

- Location within Fairbanks North Star Borough and the state of Alaska
- Country: United States
- State: Alaska
- Borough: Fairbanks North Star

Government
  - Borough mayor: Grier Hopkins
  - State senators: Scott Kawasaki (D); Robert Myers (R)
  - State reps.: Mike Prax (R); Will Stapp (R); Frank Tomaszewski (R)

Area
  - Total: 66.70 sq mi (172.75 km^{2})
  - Land: 65.65 sq mi (170.04 km^{2})
  - Water: 1.05 sq mi (2.71 km^{2})

Population (2020)
  - Total: 19,031
  - Density: 289.9/sq mi (111.92/km^{2})
- FIPS code: 02-05000

Badger is a census-designated place (CDP) in the Fairbanks North Star Borough of Alaska. It was one of the CDPs created in 2010 out of small suburbs and outskirts of Fairbanks. It has an area of 66.71 sq. mi, 65.63 of land and 1.08 of water.

The population of the CDP was 19,031 as of the 2020 Census, down from 19,482 in 2010. Badger's designation as a Place made it number 5 by population, behind Anchorage, Fairbanks, Juneau and Knik-Fairview, in a list of Alaska Cities and census-designated places (by population). Badger is a major community of the Fairbanks, AK Metropolitan Statistical Area.

== Demographics ==
Historical population
Census	Pop.	Note	%±
2010	19,482		—
2020	19,031		−2.3%
U.S. Decennial Census

=== 2020 census ===
As of the 2020 census, Badger had a population of 19,031. The median age was 33.0 years. 27.3% of residents were under the age of 18 and 9.3% of residents were 65 years of age or older. For every 100 females there were 111.9 males, and for every 100 females age 18 and over there were 112.9 males age 18 and over.

79.5% of residents lived in urban areas, while 20.5% lived in rural areas.

There were 6,995 households in Badger, of which 35.8% had children under the age of 18 living in them. Of all households, 55.4% were married-couple households, 22.4% were households with a male householder and no spouse or partner present, and 14.9% were households with a female householder and no spouse or partner present. About 22.7% of all households were made up of individuals and 5.2% had someone living alone who was 65 years of age or older.

There were 7,931 housing units, of which 11.8% were vacant. The homeowner vacancy rate was 2.2% and the rental vacancy rate was 13.2%.

Racial composition as of the 2020 census
Race	Number	Percent
White	14,207	74.7%
Black or African American	398	2.1%
American Indian and Alaska Native	1,121	5.9%
Asian	390	2.0%
Native Hawaiian and Other Pacific Islander	62	0.3%
Some other race	406	2.1%
Two or more races	2,447	12.9%
Hispanic or Latino (of any race)	1,119	5.9%

=== 2010 census ===
Badger first appeared on the 2010 U.S. Census as a census-designated place (CDP) with a total population of 19,482.

==== Sex ====
For every 100 females there were 109.9 males.

18 years and over		65 years and over	
Total	Female	Total	Female
13,744	6,518	1,017	445

==== Age ====
- Median Age: 31.4
- Total population Under 18 years: 29.5%
- Total population 65 years and over: 5.2%

Under 5	5 to 17	18 to 20	21 to 24	25 to 34	35 to 44	45 to 54	55 to 59	60 to 64	65 to 74	75 to 84	85 and over
1,685	4,053	789	1,133	3,089	2,771	2,979	1,138	828	764	200	53

==== Households ====
- Total households: 6,858
- Family households: 5,118
- Family households with own children under 18 years: 52.6%
- Family households Husband-wife family: 4,183
- Family households Husband-wife family with own children under 18 years: 49.2%
- Family households Female householder, no husband present: 525
- Family households Female householder, no husband present, with own children under 18 years: 69.1%
- Nonfamily households: 1,740
- Nonfamily households Householder living alone: 1,301
- Nonfamily households Householder living alone 65 years and over: 213
- Average size House-holds: 2.84
- Average size Families: 3.25
