= Cube Cove, Alaska =

Unincorporated community in the state of Alaska, United States

- Former Census-designated place (CDP)
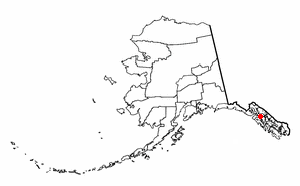
- Location of Cube Cove, Alaska
- Coordinates: 57°56′12″N 134°43′13″W
- Country: United States
- State: Alaska
- Census Area: Hoonah-Angoon

Government
  - State senator: Bert Stedman (R)
  - State rep.: Rebecca Himschoot (I)

Area
  - Total: 11.7 sq mi (30.3 km^{2})
  - Land: 11.4 sq mi (29.6 km^{2})
  - Water: 0.31 sq mi (0.8 km^{2})
- Elevation: 495 ft (151 m)

Population (2000)
  - Total: 72
- Time zone: UTC-9 (Alaska (AKST))
  - Summer (DST): UTC-8 (AKDT)
- Area code: 907
- FIPS code: 02-18030
- GNIS feature ID: 1866940

Cube Cove was an unincorporated community and census-designated place on the northwestern side of Admiralty Island in the Hoonah-Angoon Census Area of the U.S. state of Alaska. The population was 72 at the 2000 United States census, but it was not included in the 2010 census.

== Geography ==
What was Cube Cove was located at 57°56′12″N 134°43′13″W. According to the United States Census Bureau, the CDP had a total area of 11.7 square miles (30 km^{2}), of which 11.4 square miles (30 km^{2}) is land and 0.3 square miles (0.78 km^{2}), or 2.48%, is water.

== Demographics ==
Historical population
Census	Pop.	Note	%±
1990	156		—
2000	72		−53.8%
U.S. Decennial Census

Cube Cove first appeared on the 1990 U.S. Census as a census-designated place (CDP) and again in 2000. With the discontinuation of the logging camp and departure of its resident workers, it was dissolved as a CDP in 2010.

As of the census of 2000, there were 72 people, 25 households, and 23 families residing in the CDP. The population density was 6.3 inhabitants per square mile (2.4/km^{2}). There were 37 housing units at an average density of 3.2 per square mile (1.2/km^{2}). The racial makeup of the CDP was 98.61% White and 1.39% Native American. Cube Cove was a temporary timber camp, which is now deserted.

Of the 25 households, 48.0% had children under the age of 18 living with them, 84.0% were married couples living together, and 8.0% were non-families. 8.0% of all households were made up of individuals, and none had someone living alone who was 65 years of age or older. The average household size was 2.88 and the average family size was 3.04.

In the CDP, the population was spread out, with 31.9% under the age of 18, 12.5% from 18 to 24, 27.8% from 25 to 44, 25.0% from 45 to 64, and 2.8% who were 65 years of age or older. The median age was 28 years. For every 100 females, there were 111.8 males. For every 100 females age 18 and over, there were 113.0 males.

The median income for a household in the CDP was $51,875, and the median income for a family was $72,708. Males had a median income of $88,756 versus $38,750 for females. The per capita income for the CDP was $27,920. There were no families and none of the population living below the poverty line, including no under eighteens and none of those over 64.

The State of Alaska communities database reports that the logging camp that was Cube Cove has zero population.

== Education ==
Cube Cove School, operated by the Chatham School District, closed in or before 2002.
