= South Van Horn, Alaska =

South Van Horn
- CDP
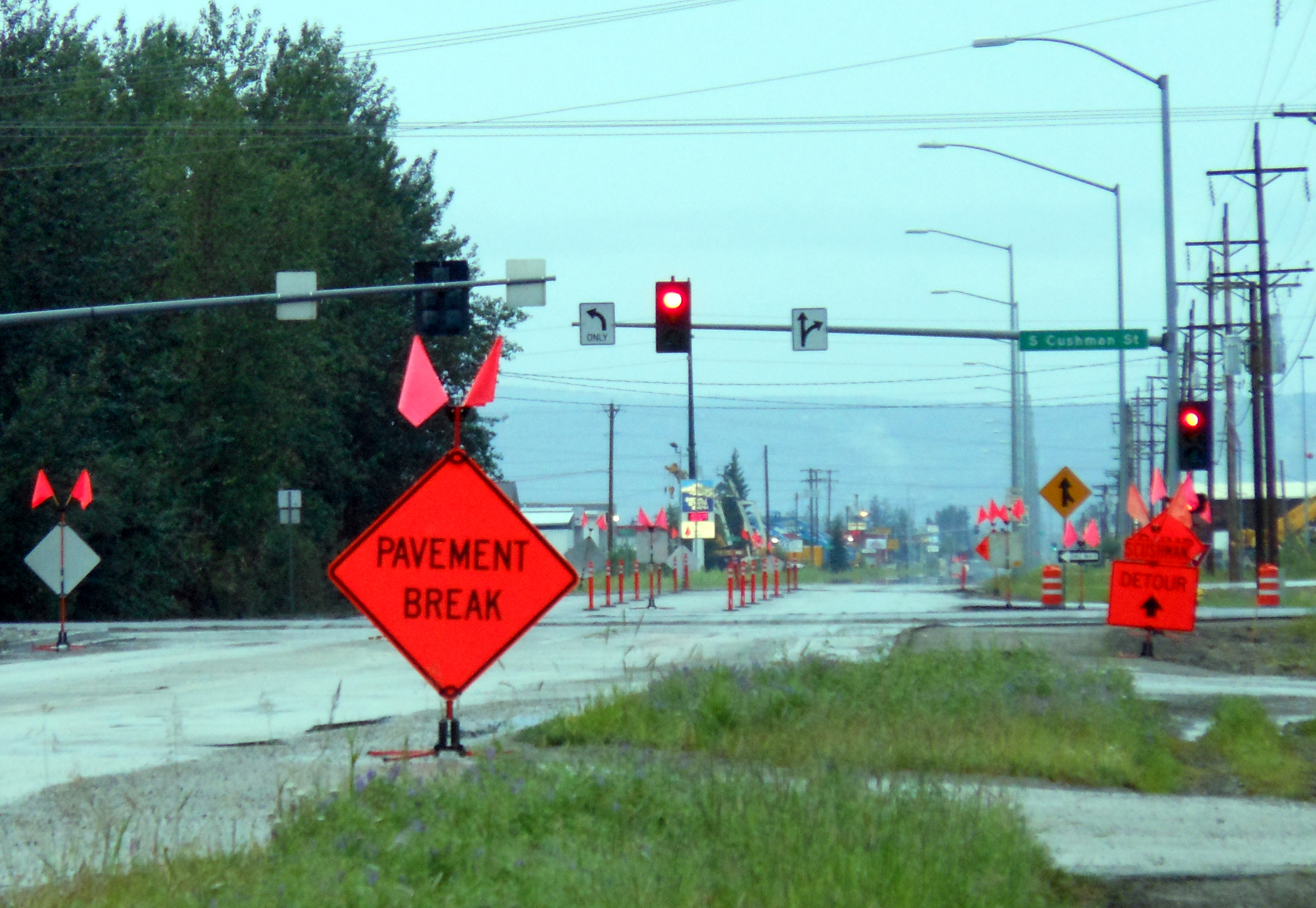
- Van Horn Road westbound at South Cushman Street in June 2012. In the background is a portion of the business district which runs along the CDP's northern edge.
- Interactive map of South Van Horn
- Country: United States
- State: Alaska
- Borough: Fairbanks North Star Borough

Government
  - Borough mayor: Bryce J. Ward
  - State senator: Click Bishop (R)
  - State rep.: Ashley Carrick (D)

Area
  - Total: 8.55 sq mi (22.15 km^{2})
  - Land: 7.86 sq mi (20.37 km^{2})
  - Water: 0.68 sq mi (1.77 km^{2})
- Elevation: 418 ft (127.4 m)

Population (2020)
  - Total: 503
  - Density: 63.9/sq mi (24.69/km^{2})
- Time zone: UTC-9 (Alaska (AKST))
  - Summer (DST): UTC-8 (AKDT)
- FIPS code: 02-72230

South Van Horn is a census-designated place (CDP) in the Fairbanks North Star Borough, Alaska, United States. As of the 2020 census, South Van Horn had a population of 503.

Fairbanks International Airport is in the city.

== Geography ==
South Van Horn is located at 64°48′34″N 147°47′17″W.

The CDP has a total area of 8.52 square miles (22.1 km^{2}), of which, 8.04 square miles (20.8 km^{2}) of it is land and 0.48 square miles (1.2 km^{2}) of it (5.68%) is water.

The elevation is 418 feet (127 m).

== Demographics ==
Historical population
Census	Pop.	Note	%±
2010	558		—
2020	503		−9.9%
U.S. Decennial Census

South Van Horn has a median age of 42.4, with a married population of 49.3%. The average household has 2.51 people. The unemployment rate is 5.5% and the median household income is $39,883.
