= Mill Bay, Alaska =

- Census-designated place
- Location within Alaska Location within North America
- Coordinates: 57°49′16″N 152°21′17″W
- Country: United States
- State: Alaska
- Borough: Kodiak Island

Government
  - Borough mayor: Aimee Williams
  - State senator: Gary Stevens (R)
  - State rep.: Louise Stutes (R)

Area
  - Total: 3.61 sq mi (9.35 km^{2})
  - Land: 3.44 sq mi (8.92 km^{2})
  - Water: 0.17 sq mi (0.43 km^{2})
- Elevation: 20 ft (6.1 m)

Population (2020)
  - Total: 4,216
  - Density: 1,224.3/sq mi (472.71/km^{2})
- Time zone: UTC-9 (Alaska (AKST))
  - Summer (DST): UTC-8 (AKDT)
- ZIP code: 99615
- Area code: 907
- FIPS code: 02-49200

Mill Bay is a census-designated place (CDP) in Kodiak Island Borough, Alaska, United States. It was first listed as a CDP prior to the 2020 census. As of the 2020 census, Mill Bay had a population of 4,216.

== Geography ==
Mill Bay is located at the northeast tip of Kodiak Island, surrounding the small bay for which the community is named. It is bordered to the southwest by the city of Kodiak.

According to the United States Census Bureau, the Mill Bay CDP has a total area of 3.61 square miles (9.35 km^{2}), of which 3.44 square miles (8.92 km^{2}) are land and 0.17 square miles (0.43 km^{2}), or 4.62%, are water.

== Demographics ==
Historical population
Census	Pop.	Note	%±
2020	4,216		—
U.S. Decennial Census

=== 2020 census ===
As of the 2020 census, Mill Bay had a population of 4,216. It is the second most populated place in the borough.

The median age was 36.7 years. 26.9% of residents were under the age of 18 and 11.7% of residents were 65 years of age or older. For every 100 females there were 108.2 males, and for every 100 females age 18 and over there were 106.5 males age 18 and over.

100.0% of residents lived in urban areas, while 0.0% lived in rural areas.

There were 1,550 households in Mill Bay, of which 37.1% had children under the age of 18 living in them. Of all households, 53.4% were married-couple households, 20.6% were households with a male householder and no spouse or partner present, and 19.4% were households with a female householder and no spouse or partner present. About 24.7% of all households were made up of individuals and 6.8% had someone living alone who was 65 years of age or older.

There were 1,700 housing units, of which 8.8% were vacant. The homeowner vacancy rate was 1.6% and the rental vacancy rate was 9.0%.

Racial composition as of the 2020 census
Race	Number	Percent
White	2,501	59.3%
Black or African American	9	0.2%
American Indian and Alaska Native	568	13.5%
Asian	420	10.0%
Native Hawaiian and Other Pacific Islander	44	1.0%
Some other race	106	2.5%
Two or more races	568	13.5%
Hispanic or Latino (of any race)	289	6.9%
