= Fox, Alaska =

- Census-designated place
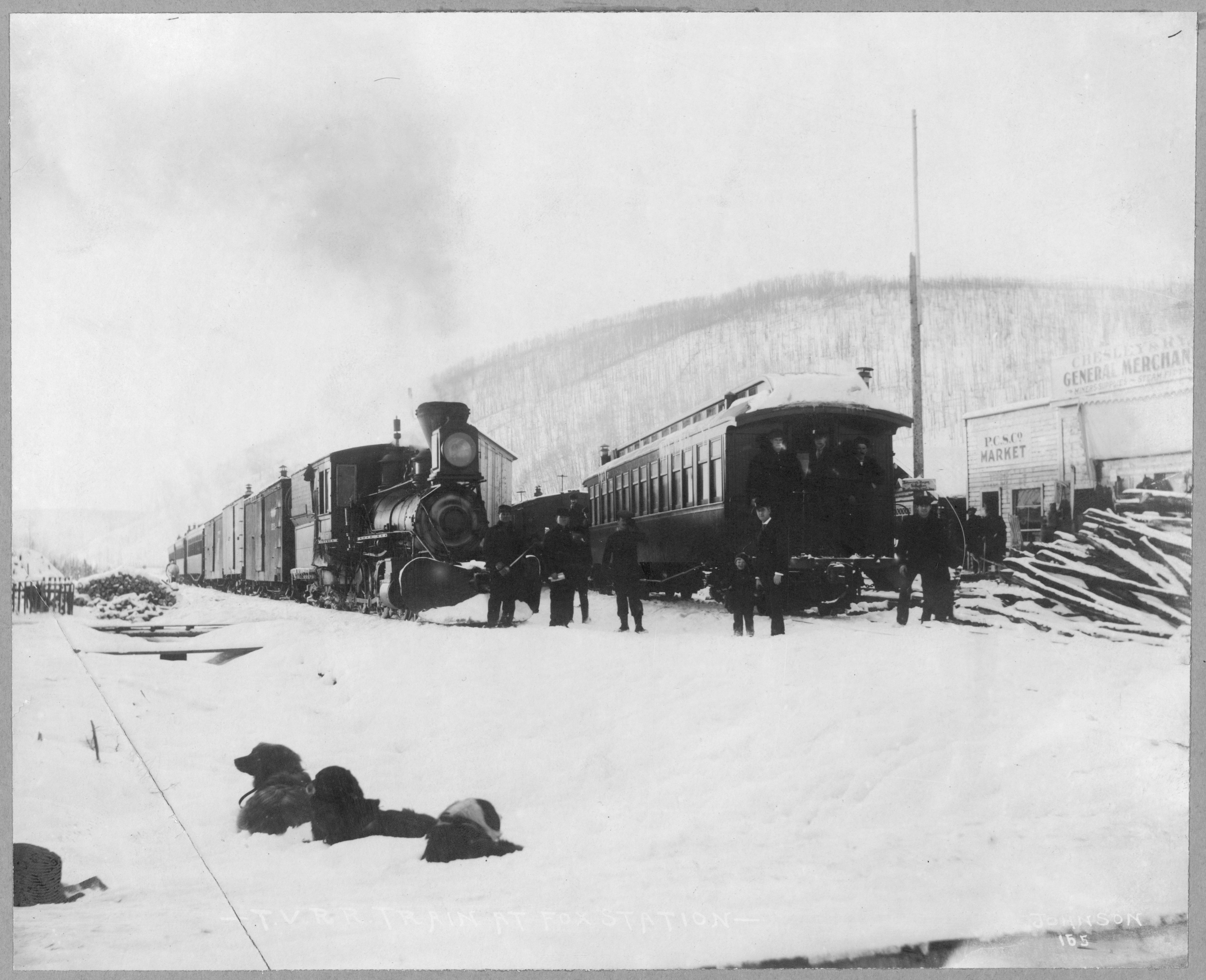
- Trains of the Tanana Valley Railroad at the station in Fox, Alaska, in 1916

- Location within Fairbanks North Star Borough and the state of Alaska
- Coordinates: 64°57′14″N 147°37′42″W
- Country: United States
- State: Alaska
- Borough: Fairbanks North Star

Government
  - Borough mayor: Bryce J. Ward
  - State senator: Robert Myers (R)
  - State rep.: Frank Tomaszewski (R)

Area
  - Total: 12.99 sq mi (33.65 km^{2})
  - Land: 12.99 sq mi (33.65 km^{2})
  - Water: 0 sq mi (0.00 km^{2})
- Elevation: 751 ft (229 m)

Population (2020)
  - Total: 406
  - Density: 31.3/sq mi (12.07/km^{2})
- Time zone: UTC-9 (Alaska (AKST))
  - Summer (DST): UTC-8 (AKDT)
- ZIP code: 99712
- Area code: 907
- FIPS code: 02-26870
- GNIS feature ID: 1402342

Fox is a census-designated place (CDP) in Fairbanks North Star Borough, Alaska, United States. It is part of the Fairbanks, Alaska Metropolitan Statistical Area. As of the 2020 census, Fox had a population of 406.

== Geography ==
Fox is located at 64°57′14″N 147°37′42″W (64.953979, -147.628325), on the bank of Fox Creek as it enters Goldstream Creek Valley, 10 mi (16 km) northeast of Fairbanks. Steese Highway and Elliott Highway intersect in Fox.

Established as a mining camp in the early 1900s, Fox functions as a bedroom community today and most residents work in nearby Fairbanks or at Fort Knox Gold Mine to the northeast. The Permafrost Tunnel Research Facility was built in the 1960s to study permafrost.

According to the United States Census Bureau, the CDP has a total area of 13.1 square miles (33.9 km^{2}), all of it land.

== Demographics ==
Historical population
Census	Pop.	Note	%±
1950	25		—
1980	123		—
1990	275		123.6%
2000	300		9.1%
2010	417		39.0%
2020	406		−2.6%
U.S. Decennial Census

Fox first appeared on the 1950 U.S. Census as an unincorporated village. It did not appear again until 1980 when it was made a census-designated place (CDP).

As of 2007, there were 353 people, 119 households, and 71 families residing in the CDP. The population density was 22.1 inhabitants per square mile (8.5/km^{2}). There were 159 housing units at an average density of 11.7 per square mile (4.5/km^{2}). The racial makeup of the CDP was 87.67% White, 8.00% Native American, 0.33% Asian, 1.33% from other races, and 2.67% from two or more races. 1.33% of the population were Hispanic or Latino of any race.

There were 119 households, out of which 34.5% had children under the age of 18 living with them, 49.6% were married couples living together, 6.7% had a female householder with no husband present, and 39.5% were non-families. 31.1% of all households were made up of individuals, and 2.5% had someone living alone who was 65 years of age or older. The average household size was 2.52 and the average family size was 3.19.

In the CDP, the population was spread out, with 28.3% under the age of 18, 5.0% from 18 to 24, 32.7% from 25 to 44, 30.0% from 45 to 64, and 4.0% who were 65 years of age or older. The median age was 36 years. For every 100 females, there were 117.4 males. For every 100 females age 18 and over, there were 133.7 males.

The median income for a household in the CDP was $51,176, and the median income for a family was $64,107. Males had a median income of $39,297 versus $22,273 for females. The per capita income for the CDP was $22,689. None of the families and 8.7% of the population were living below the poverty line.

== Economy ==
Fox is home to several restaurants popular with Fairbanksans. One of these, the Howling Dog Saloon, was originally situated in Ester, but moved to Fox in the early 1970s. Across from this saloon is the Silver Gulch Brewery. The Turtle Club restaurant and bar is nearby. There is also a small general store/gas station.
