= Jesse Sumner (politician) =

American politician

- Sumner in 2023

Member of the Alaska House of Representatives from the 28th district
- In office January 17, 2023 – January 21, 2025
- Preceded by: James D. Kaufman
- Succeeded by: Elexie Moore

Personal details
- Born: Palmer, Alaska, U.S.
- Party: Republican

James Sumner is an American politician who served as the Republican member of the Alaska House of Representatives for the 28th district. Elected in 2022, he previously served on the Matanuska-Susitna Borough Assembly.

== Career ==
Sumner is a life-long Mat-Su Valley resident and co-owner, along with his brother Maxwell, of Sumner Company Homes. He served on the Wasilla Planning Commission and was the vice-chair of the conservative think tank Alaska Policy Forum.

Sumner was elected to the Matanuska-Susitna Borough Assembly in 2018, representing North Palmer and Wasilla.

Sumner and his brother both filed for the 2022 Alaska's at-large congressional district special election, but he later withdrew claiming his registration was an April Fool's joke. He backed Nick Begich III and criticized Sarah Palin for not being involved in Alaska politics.

Sumner initially ran for re-election in 2024, but withdrew following the primary election, citing family concerns.

== Electoral history ==
=== 2024 ===
==== Primary ====
2024 Nonpartisan primary
Party	Candidate	Votes	%
Republican	Jesse Sumner (incumbent, withdrew)	727	33.0
Republican	Steve Menard	608	27.6
Republican	Elexie Moore	508	23.1
Republican	Jessica Wright	359	16.3
Total votes		2,202	100.0
