= Thoms Place, Wrangell =

Thoms Place, Alaska
- Former census-designated place
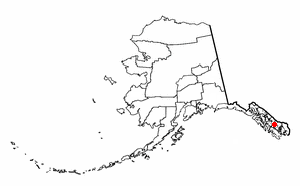
- Location of Thoms Place, Alaska
- Coordinates: 56°11′42″N 132°11′53″W
- Country: United States
- State: Alaska
- Borough: Wrangell

Government
  - State senator: Bert Stedman (R)
  - State rep.: Dan Ortiz (I)

Area
  - Total: 10.7 sq mi (27.6 km^{2})
  - Land: 10.7 sq mi (27.6 km^{2})
  - Water: 0 sq mi (0.0 km^{2})
- Elevation: 410 ft (125 m)

Population (2000)
  - Total: 22
  - Density: 2.1/sq mi (0.8/km^{2})
- Time zone: UTC-9 (Alaska (AKST))
  - Summer (DST): UTC-8 (AKDT)
- Area code: 907
- FIPS code: 02-76970
- GNIS feature ID: 1865568

Thoms Place is a former census-designated place (CDP) on Wrangell Island in the city of Wrangell, Alaska, United States.The population was 22 at the 2000 census, at which time it was an unincorporated part of the former Wrangell-Petersburg Census Area, Alaska. It is now included in the City and Borough of Wrangell, which became a borough on June 1, 2008.

== Geography ==
Thoms Place is located at 56°11′42″N 132°11′53″W (56.195077, -132.198042).

According to the United States Census Bureau, the CDP had a total area of 10.6 square miles (27 km^{2}), all of it land.

== Demographics ==
Historical population
Census	Pop.	Note	%±
2000	22		—
U.S. Decennial Census

Thoms Place appeared once on the 2000 U.S. Census as a census-designated place (CDP). In 2008, it was consolidated into the city of Wrangell.

As of the Census of 2000, there were 22 people, 13 households, and 7 families residing in the CDP. The population density was 2.1 people per square mile (0.81 people/km^{2}). There were 30 housing units at an average density of 2.8 per square mile (1.1/km^{2}). The racial makeup of the CDP was 86.36% White and 13.64% Native American.

There were 13 households, out of which none had children under the age of 18 living with them, 61.5% were married couples living together, and 38.5% were non-families. 38.5% of all households were made up of individuals, and none had someone living alone who was 65 years of age or older. The average household size was 1.69 and the average family size was 2.13.

In the CDP, the age distribution of the population shows 9.1% from 25 to 44, 77.3% from 45 to 64, and 13.6% who were 65 years of age or older. The median age was 54 years. For every 100 females, there were 175.0 males. For every 100 females age 18 and over, there were 175.0 males.

The median income for a household in the CDP was $28,750, and the median income for a family was $28,750. Males had a median income of $0 versus $0 for females. The per capita income for the CDP was $16,086. 33.3% of families and 31.0% of the population were living below the poverty line, including no under eighteens and none of those over 64.
