= Farmers Loop, Alaska =

Coordinates: 64°53′48″N 147°41′39″W

Farmers Loop
- Census-designated place
- Location within Fairbanks North Star Borough and the U.S. state of Alaska
- Country: United States
- State: Alaska
- Borough: Fairbanks North Star

Government
  - Borough mayor: Bryce J. Ward
  - State senator: Robert Myers (R)
  - State rep.: Frank Tomaszewski (R)

Area
  - Total: 21.82 sq mi (56.51 km^{2})
  - Land: 21.80 sq mi (56.45 km^{2})
  - Water: 0.023 sq mi (0.06 km^{2})

Population (2020)
  - Total: 4,704
  - Density: 215.8/sq mi (83.33/km^{2})
- Time zone: UTC−9 (AKST)
  - Summer (DST): UTC−8 (AKDT)
- FIPS code: 02-24980

Farmers Loop is a census-designated place in Fairbanks North Star Borough, Alaska, United States. It was one of several CDPs created out of various Fairbanks suburbs and outskirts during the 2010 census. As of the 2020 census, Farmers Loop had a population of 4,704. The CDP is located north of Fairbanks and is centered on and named for Farmers Loop Road, a road that runs along the foothills north of Fairbanks between the Steese Highway and the northeastern corner of the University of Alaska Fairbanks campus.

According to the U.S. Census Bureau, the Farmers Loop CDP has a total area of 21.90 square miles (56.71 km^{2}), of which 21.87 square miles (56.65 km^{2}) is land and 0.02 square miles (0.06 km^{2}), or 0.10%, is water.

== Demographics ==
Historical population
Census	Pop.	Note	%±
2010	4,853		—
2020	4,704		−3.1%
U.S. Decennial Census

=== 2020 census ===
As of the 2020 census, Farmers Loop had a population of 4,704. The median age was 39.2 years. 23.0% of residents were under the age of 18 and 15.1% of residents were 65 years of age or older. For every 100 females there were 109.3 males, and for every 100 females age 18 and over there were 111.8 males age 18 and over.

62.4% of residents lived in urban areas, while 37.6% lived in rural areas.

There were 1,891 households in Farmers Loop, of which 28.8% had children under the age of 18 living in them. Of all households, 52.7% were married-couple households, 24.4% were households with a male householder and no spouse or partner present, and 15.3% were households with a female householder and no spouse or partner present. About 27.2% of all households were made up of individuals and 7.9% had someone living alone who was 65 years of age or older.

There were 2,116 housing units, of which 10.6% were vacant. The homeowner vacancy rate was 1.2% and the rental vacancy rate was 9.2%.

Racial composition as of the 2020 census
Race	Number	Percent
White	3,659	77.8%
Black or African American	38	0.8%
American Indian and Alaska Native	288	6.1%
Asian	86	1.8%
Native Hawaiian and Other Pacific Islander	6	0.1%
Some other race	68	1.4%
Two or more races	559	11.9%
Hispanic or Latino (of any race)	195	4.1%
