= Fairbanks North Star Borough, Alaska =

Borough in Alaska, United States

- Borough
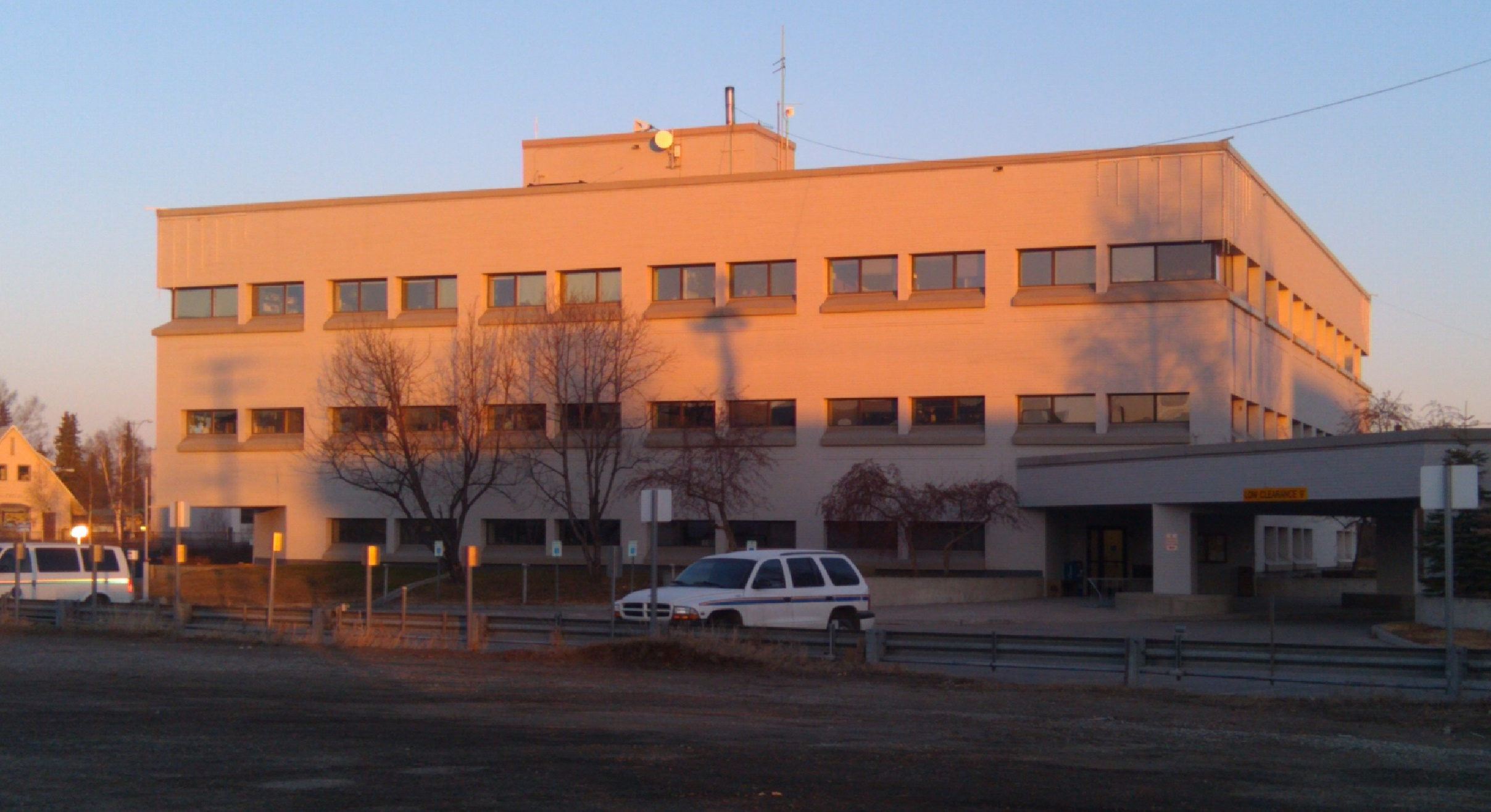
- Fairbanks North Star Borough Administrative Center

- Seal

- Location within the U.S. state of Alaska
- Coordinates: 64°50′N 146°25′W
- Country: United States
- State: Alaska
- Incorporated: January 1, 1964
- Named for: Fairbanks and Polaris, the North Star
- Seat: Fairbanks
- Largest city: Fairbanks

Area
  - Total: 7,444 sq mi (19,280 km^{2})
  - Land: 7,338 sq mi (19,010 km^{2})
  - Water: 105 sq mi (270 km^{2}) 1.4%

Population (2020)
  - Total: 95,655
  - Estimate (2025): 93,972 ▼
  - Density: 13.04/sq mi (5.033/km^{2})
- Time zone: UTC−9 (Alaska)
  - Summer (DST): UTC−8 (ADT)
- Congressional district: At-large
- Website: co.fairbanks.ak.us

The Fairbanks North Star Borough is a borough located in the U.S. state of Alaska. As of the 2020 census, the population was 95,655, down from 97,581 in 2010. The borough seat is Fairbanks. The borough's land area is slightly smaller than that of the state of New Jersey.

Fairbanks North Star Borough comprises the Fairbanks, AK, Metropolitan Statistical Area, one of only two metropolitan areas in Alaska.

The borough is home to the University of Alaska Fairbanks, Fort Wainwright and Eielson Air Force Base.

== Geography ==
The borough has a total area of 7,444 square miles (19,280 km^{2}), of which 7,338 square miles (19,010 km^{2}) is land and 105 square miles (270 km^{2}) (1.4%) is water.

=== Adjacent boroughs and census areas ===
- Yukon–Koyukuk Census Area, Alaska – north
- Southeast Fairbanks Census Area, Alaska – southeast
- Denali Borough, Alaska – southwest

== Government and politics ==
The assembly is the borough's governing body, or legislative branch. The assembly consists of nine members who are elected at-large (borough-wide), serving three-year terms. The borough operates under a "strong mayor" system. The mayor, along with his chief of staff, performs many of the job duties normally associated with a city manager.

Though a somewhat urban county with a notable student population, the borough is generally as Republican as Alaska as a whole. Democratic candidates have not won Fairbanks North Star Borough since Alaska's first two presidential elections. Joe Biden in 2020 is the only Democrat to receive 40% of the vote since Lyndon Johnson's 1964 landslide victory. As with the rest of Alaska, the borough is also friendlier to third parties than most of the United States. George Wallace, Roger MacBride, Ed Clark, Ross Perot, Ralph Nader, and Gary Johnson each received over ten percent of the vote in their candidacies despite campaigning on radically different platforms.

Downballot, Fairbanks North Star Borough is a bellwether county. Fairbanks North Star Borough has voted for the winner of Alaska's governorship since its founding, which has included multiple victories for both major parties, multiple victories for independents, and one victory for the Alaskan Independence Party.

Mayor

- Grier Hopkins (D)

Assembly members

- Seat A – David Guttenberg
- Seat B – Brett Rotermund
- Seat C – Mindy O'Neall
- Seat D – Liz Reeves-Ramos
- Seat E – Nick LaJiness
- Seat F – Savannah Fletcher
- Seat G – Kristan Kelly
- Seat H – Scott Crass
- Seat I – Barbara Haney

The borough operates a public library system; the main library is the Noel Wien Public Library.

United States presidential election results for Fairbanks North Star Borough, Alaska
Year	Republican		Democratic		Third party(ies)	
Year	No.	%	No.	%	No.	%
1960	3,818	48.40%	4,070	51.60%	0	0.00%
1964	3,526	42.30%	4,810	57.70%	0	0.00%
1968	4,270	47.00%	3,435	37.81%	1,381	15.20%
1972	7,706	53.70%	5,539	38.60%	1,106	7.71%
1976	10,279	54.00%	6,681	35.10%	2,075	10.90%
1980	11,601	50.70%	5,285	23.10%	5,995	26.20%
1984	18,806	66.30%	8,112	28.60%	1,447	5.10%
1988	18,728	60.50%	10,587	34.20%	1,640	5.30%
1992	15,224	39.60%	10,880	28.30%	12,341	32.10%
1996	18,521	52.40%	10,816	30.60%	6,009	17.00%
2000	25,526	61.50%	10,201	24.58%	5,780	13.93%
2004	20,268	64.40%	10,103	32.10%	1,101	3.50%
2008	27,302	61.50%	15,893	35.80%	1,198	2.70%
2012	23,755	58.60%	14,716	36.30%	2,068	5.10%
2016	22,012	53.86%	13,494	33.02%	5,364	13.12%
2020	24,917	55.10%	18,138	40.11%	2,165	4.79%
2024	24,857	56.90%	17,037	39.00%	1,791	4.10%

== Demographics ==
Historical population
Census	Pop.	Note	%±
1960	43,412		—
1970	45,864		5.6%
1980	53,983		17.7%
1990	77,720		44.0%
2000	82,840		6.6%
2010	97,581		17.8%
2020	95,655		−2.0%
2025 (est.)	93,972	▼	−1.8%
U.S. Decennial Census; 1790–1960 1900–1990; 1990–2000 2010–2020

=== 2020 census ===
Fairbanks North Star Borough, Alaska – Racial and ethnic composition Note: the US Census treats Hispanic/Latino as an ethnic category. This table excludes Latinos from the racial categories and assigns them to a separate category. Hispanics/Latinos may be of any race.
Race / Ethnicity (NH = Non-Hispanic)	Pop 1980	Pop 1990	Pop 2000	Pop 2010	Pop 2020	% 1980	% 1990	% 2000	% 2010	% 2020
White alone (NH)	45,221	62,201	62,942	72,259	63,178	83.77%	80.03%	75.98%	74.05%	66.05%
Black or African American alone (NH)	2,953	5,395	4,719	4,154	3,804	5.47%	6.94%	5.70%	4.26%	3.98%
Native American or Alaska Native alone (NH)	2,987	5,238	5,596	6,669	7,299	5.53%	6.74%	6.76%	6.83%	7.63%
Asian alone (NH)	816	1,913	1,682	2,512	3,031	1.51%	2.46%	2.03%	2.57%	3.17%
Native Hawaiian or Pacific Islander alone (NH)	x	x	237	375	584	x	x	0.29%	0.38%	0.61%
Other race alone (NH)	460	74	265	191	812	0.85%	0.10%	0.32%	0.20%	0.85%
Mixed race or Multiracial (NH)	x	x	3,959	5,770	9,627	x	x	4.78%	5.91%	10.06%
Hispanic or Latino (any race)	1,546	2,899	3,440	5,651	7,320	2.86%	3.73%	4.15%	5.79%	7.65%
Total	53,983	77,720	82,840	97,581	95,655	100.00%	100.00%	100.00%	100.00%	100.00%

As of the 2020 census, the county had a population of 95,655. The median age was 32.6 years. 23.9% of residents were under the age of 18 and 11.5% of residents were 65 years of age or older. For every 100 females there were 114.1 males, and for every 100 females age 18 and over there were 117.0 males age 18 and over.

The racial makeup of the county was 69.0% White, 4.2% Black or African American, 7.9% American Indian and Alaska Native, 3.2% Asian, 0.6% Native Hawaiian and Pacific Islander, 2.3% from some other race, and 12.7% from two or more races. Hispanic or Latino residents of any race comprised 7.7% of the population.

74.6% of residents lived in urban areas, while 25.4% lived in rural areas.

There were 36,521 households in the county, of which 31.9% had children under the age of 18 living with them and 20.5% had a female householder with no spouse or partner present. 29.6% of all households were made up of individuals and 7.8% had someone living alone who was 65 years of age or older.

There were 42,659 housing units, of which 14.4% were vacant. Among occupied housing units, 58.9% were owner-occupied and 41.1% were renter-occupied. The homeowner vacancy rate was 2.0% and the rental vacancy rate was 12.1%.

=== 2000 census ===
As of the 2000 census, there were 82,840 people, 29,777 households, and 20,516 families were residing in the borough. The population density was 11 people per square mile (4.2 people/km^{2}). There were 33,291 housing units at an average density of 4 per square mile (1.5/km^{2}). The racial makeup of the borough was 77.79% White, 5.6% Black or African American, 6.90% Native American, 2.08% Asian, 0.30% Pacific Islander, 1.71% from other races, and 5.39% from two or more races. 4.15% of the population were Hispanic or Latino of any race.

Of the 29,777 households, 41.30% had children under the age of 18 living with them, 54.70% were married couples living together, 9.30% had a female householder with no husband present, and 31.10% were non-families. 23.60% of households were one person, and 3.60% were one person aged 65 or older. The average household size was 2.68 and the average family size was 3.20.

In the borough the population was spread out, with 30.10% under the age of 18, 12.20% from 18 to 24, 33.30% from 25 to 44, 19.80% from 45 to 64, and 4.60% 65 or older. The median age was 30 years. For every 100 females, there were 109.10 males. For every 100 females age 18 and over, there were 110.90 males.

== Communities ==
=== Cities ===
- Fairbanks (Borough seat)
- North Pole

=== Census-designated places ===
- Badger
- Chena Ridge
- College
- Eielson AFB
- Ester
- Farmers Loop
- Fox
- Goldstream
- Harding-Birch Lakes
- Moose Creek
- Pleasant Valley
- Salcha
- South Van Horn
- Steele Creek
- Two Rivers

=== Unincorporated communities ===
- Chatanika
- Chena Hot Springs

=== Census Subareas ===
- Fairbanks North Star

== Education ==
The entire borough is zoned to Fairbanks North Star Borough School District.

== Sister cities ==
- Pune, India
- Yakutsk, Russia

== See also ==
- List of airports in Fairbanks North Star Borough
- National Register of Historic Places listings in Fairbanks North Star Borough, Alaska
