= Frank Tomaszewski =

Member of the Alaska House of Representatives from the 34th district
- Incumbent
- Assumed office January 17, 2023
- Preceded by: Grier Hopkins (redistricting)
- Succeeded by: Joy Cottle (elect)

Personal details
- Born: ca. 1972 (age 53–54)
- Party: Republican
- Spouse: Harmony
- Children: 5

Frank J. Tomaszewski (born ca. 1972) is an American politician serving as a member of the Alaska House of Representatives from the 34th District since 2023. He received nearly 56 percent of the vote to incumbent representative Grier Hopkins 44 percent.

== Personal life ==
Tomaszewski moved to Fairbanks, Alaska with his family when he was seven years old. He has five children and one granddaughter.

Prior to being elected, he worked as a syrup maker, having been inspired by a video about making birch syrup which he saw on YouTube. He later founded his own company dedicated to syrup, Sample Alaska.

== Electoral history ==
=== 2022 general ===
2022 Alaska House of Representatives election, District 34
Party	Candidate	First Choice			Round 1			Round 2	
Party	Candidate	Votes	%	Transfer	Votes	%	Transfer	Votes	%
Republican	Frank Tomaszewski	3,607	48.9	+8	3,615	49.0	+398	4,013	55.6
Democratic	Grier Hopkins (incumbent)	3,172	43.0	+3	3,175	43.2	+25	3,200	44.4
Republican	Nate DeMars	575	7.8	+11	586	7.9	-586	Eliminated	
Write-in		16	0.2	-16	Eliminated				
Total votes		7,370			7,376			7,213	
Blank or inactive ballots					317		+163	480	

=== 2024 ===
==== Primary ====
2024 Nonpartisan primary
Party	Candidate	Votes	%
Republican	Frank Tomaszewski (incumbent)	1,667	53.4
Republican	Joy Beth Cottle	1,445	46.4
Total votes		3,112	100.0

==== General ====
2024 Alaska House of Representatives election, District 34
Party	Candidate	Votes	%
Republican	Frank Tomaszewski (incumbent)	4,887	56.0
Republican	Joy Beth Cottle	3,765	43.1
Write-in		83	1.0
Total votes		8,735	100.0
Republican hold			
