= List of marine protected areas of Alaska =

State and federally managed ocean reserves

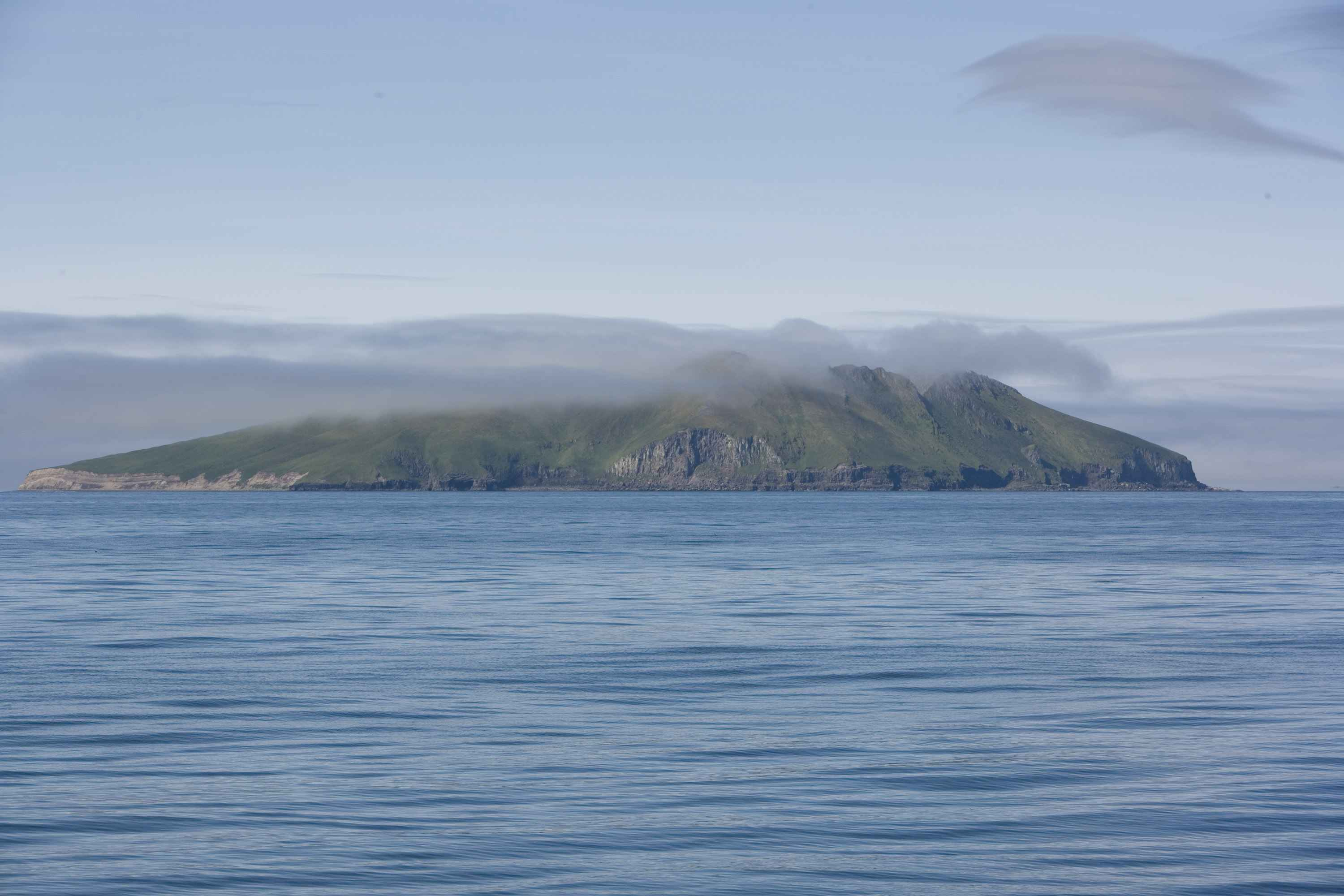
Kasatochi Island, Alaska Maritime National Wildlife Refuge

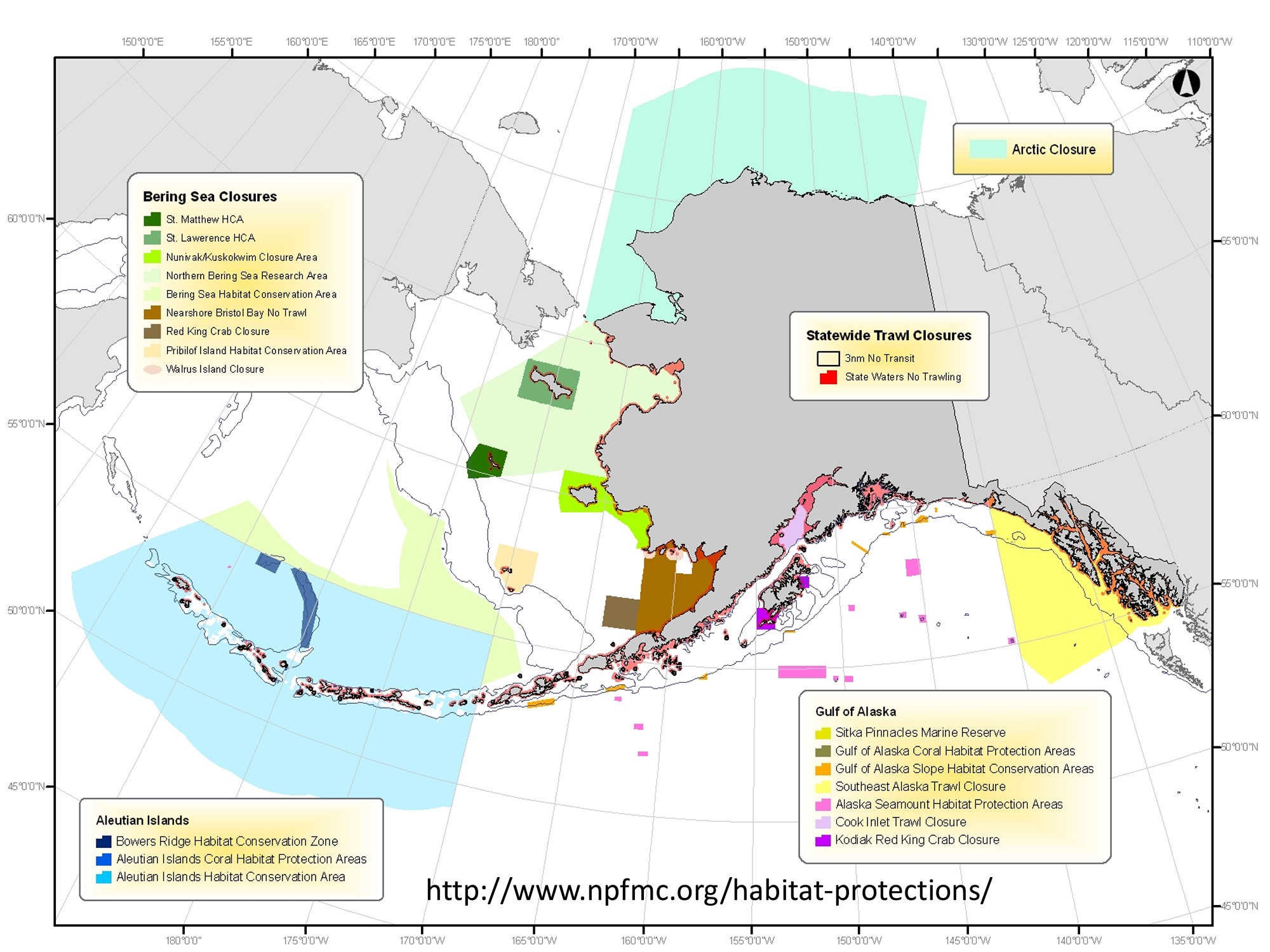
Protected areas of Alaska map (NOAA)

This is a list of marine protected areas of the U.S. state of Alaska. State protected marine areas are managed by the Alaska Department of Natural Resources.

== Federally protected marine areas ==
Various federal entities including the National Marine Fisheries Service oversee these and other protected marine areas in Alaska.

- Alaska Maritime National Wildlife Refuge
- Alaska Seamount Habitat Protection Areas
- Aleutian Islands Coral Habitat Protection Area
- Aleutian Islands Habitat Conservation Area
- Bering Sea Habitat Conservation Area
- Bowers Ridge Habitat Conservation Zone
- Gulf of Alaska Slope Habitat Conservation Areas
- Nunivak/Etolin/Kuskokwim Habitat Conservation Area
- Pribilof Island Area Habitat Conservation Area
- Lawrence Island Habitat Conservation Area
- St. Matthews Island Habitat Conservation Area

== State marine protected areas ==
- Bettles Bay State Marine Park
- Betton Island State Marine Park
- Big Bear Baby Bear State Marine Park
- Black Sands State Marine Park
- Boswell Bay Beaches State Marine Park
- Canoe Passage State Marine Park
- Chilkat Islands State Marine Park
- Decision Point State Marine Park
- Driftwood Bay State Marine Park
- Edgecumbe Pinnacles Marine Reserve
- Entry Cove State Marine Park
- Funter Bay State Marine Park
- Grant Island State Marine Park
- Grindall Island State Marine Park
- Hole in the Wall State Marine Park
- Jack Bay State Marine Park
- Juneau Channel Islands State Marine Park
- Magoun Island State Marine Park
- Oliver Inlet State Marine Park
- Pavlof Harbor State Marine Park
- Safety Cove State Marine Park
- Sandspit Point State Marine Park
- Sawmill Bay State Marine Park
- Sealion Cove State Marine Park
- Security Bay State Marine Park
- Shoup Bay State Marine Park
- South Esther Island State Marine Park
- St. James Bay State Marine Park
- Sullivan Island State Marine Park
- Sunny Cove State Marine Park
- Surprise Cove State Marine Park
- Taku Harbor State Marine Park
- Thoms Place State Marine Park
- Thumb Harbor State Marine Park

== See also ==
- List of marine protected areas of California
- List of marine protected areas of Hawaii
- List of marine protected areas of Oregon
- List of marine protected areas of Washington
