= Birch Lake =

Birch Lake may refer to:

== Communities ==
- Birch Lake Township, in Cass County, Minnesota
- Birch Lake, a hamlet in Meadstead Rural Municipality No. 497, Saskatchewan
- Harding-Birch Lakes, a census-designated place in Alaska

== Lakes ==
=== Canada ===
- Birch Lake (Nova Scotia)
- Birch Lake (Ontario), one of nineteen lakes of that name in Ontario

=== United States ===
- Birch Lake (Aitkin County, Minnesota)
- Birch Lake (Alaska), in Fairbanks North Star Borough
- Birch Lake, in Goodhue County, Minnesota
- Birch Lake (Cass County, Minnesota)
- Birch Lake (Laona, Wisconsin)
- Birch Lake, in White Bear Lake, Minnesota
- Birch Lake, in Vandalia, Michigan
- Birch Lake (Oklahoma), in Osage County

=== Canada and United States ===
- Birch Lake (Minnesota/Ontario), an international lake in St. Louis County, Minnesota

== Parks ==
- Birch Lakes State Forest, Minnesota
- Birch Lake State Recreation Site, Alaska
