= Deshka Landing Fire =

2019 wildfire in Alaska

- Date: August 17, 2019–September 9, 2019
- Location: Matanuska-Susitna Borough, Alaska, United States
- Coordinates: 61.712°N 150.176°W

Statistics
- Burned area: 1,318 acres (533 ha)

Impacts
- Injuries: 2

Ignition
- Cause: Human cause

Map
- Location in Alaska

Deshka Landing Fire was a wildfire that burned five miles southwest of Willow in Matanuska-Susitna Borough, Alaska in the United States. The fire started on August 17, 2019 and burned 1,318 acres (533 ha).

== Fire ==
=== August ===
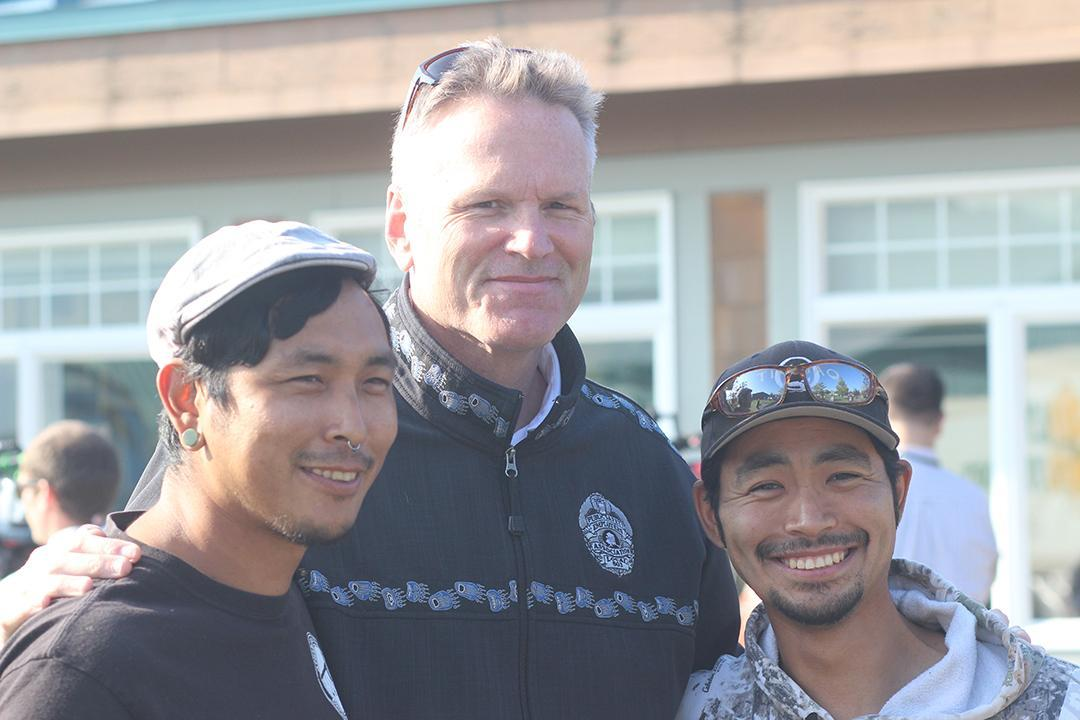
Alaska Governor Mike Dunleavy meets with firefighters on August 25, 2019

The Deshka Landing Fire was reported on August 17, 2019, around 8:00 p.m., five miles southwest of Willow, Alaska. On August 23, the Northwest Incident Management Team reported that high winds grew the fire to 1,543 acres (624 ha) and it was 15 percent contained. Firefighters began protecting homes around Red Shirt Lake. Nancy Lake State Recreation Area was closed to the public and a Temporary Flight Restriction was put in place over the fire area. The following day, a private aircraft violated the temporary flight restriction. By August 26, the fire was mapped appropriately and the Incident Management Team reported the fire's footprint was actually 1,395 acres (565 ha) and it was 40 percent contained. Two firefighters were injured: one suffered a leg burn by stepping in an ash pit and the other, a foreign object in the eye. A portion of the Nancy Lake State Recreation Area was reopened to the public. As of August 31, the fire had burned 1,318 acres (533 ha)and was 90 percent contained.

=== September ===
As of the first of the month, Northwest Incident Management Team stated that the fire was caused by a human. As of September 8, the fire had burned 1,318 acres (533 ha) and was 95 percent contained. The Temporary Flight Restriction was lifted that day. On September 9, the Nancy Lake State Recreation Area was fully reopened to the public and hunters.

== Impact ==
The fire caused the closure of the Nancy Lake State Recreation Area for two weeks, impacting hunting season.
