= Government of Alaska =

State government of the U.S. State of Alaska

- The Seal of the State of Alaska
- Part of: United States of America
- Constitution: Constitution of Alaska

Legislative branch
- Name: Legislature
- Type: Bicameral
- Meeting place: Alaska Capitol
- Upper house
- Name: Senate
- Presiding officer: Gary Stevens, President of the Senate
- Lower house
- Name: House of Representatives
- Presiding officer: Bryce Edgmon, Speaker of the House

Executive branch
- Head of state and government
- Title: Governor
- Currently: Mike Dunleavy
- Appointer: Election
- Cabinet
- Leader: Governor
- Deputy leader: Lieutenant Governor
- Headquarters: State Capitol

Judicial branch
- Name: Judiciary of Alaska
- Courts: Courts of Alaska
- Alaska Supreme Court
- Chief judge: Daniel Winfree

The government of Alaska in common with state and federal governments of the United States, has three branches of government: the executive, consisting of the governor of Alaska and the state agencies; the state legislature consisting of two chambers, the House of Representatives and the Senate; and the judiciary consisting of the Supreme court and lower courts.

Alaska has 246 federally recognized tribal governments and one federal Indian (Native American) reservation.

== Executive branch ==
The governor of Alaska is the senior-most official of the Alaska executive branch. The main Alaska state agencies are the:

- Department of Administration
- Department of Commerce, Community and Economic Development
- Department of Corrections
- Department of Education and Early Development
- Department of Environmental Conservation
- Department of Fish and Game
- Department of Health and Social Services
- Department of Labor and Workforce Development
- Department of Law
- Department of Military and Veteran Affairs
- Department of Natural Resources
- Department of Public Safety
- Department of Revenue
- Department of Transportation and Public Facilities

Other agencies are the:

- Alaska Division of Juvenile Justice
- Alaska Permanent Fund
- Alaska Volcano Observatory
- Alaska Oil and Gas Conservation Commission
- Alaska State Pension Investment Board

The current governor of Alaska is Mike Dunleavy (R) and the lieutenant governor of Alaska is Nancy Dahlstrom (R).

== Legislature ==
Alaska has a Legislature. It is a bicameral institution, consisting of a lower chamber, the Alaska House of Representatives with 40 members, and an upper chamber, the Alaska Senate with 20 members. There are 40 House Districts (1-40) and 20 Senate Districts (A-T). The Alaska Legislature meets in the State Capitol building in Juneau.

== Judiciary ==
The Alaska Court System is the unified, centrally administered, and totally state-funded judicial system. The Alaska District Court are the primary misdemeanor trial courts, the Alaska Superior Courts are the primary felony trial courts, and the Alaska Supreme Court and the Alaska Court of Appeals are the primary appellate courts. The chief justice of the Alaska Supreme Court is the administrative head of the Alaska Court System.

== Local government ==
Alaska has two levels of local government, including boroughs (of which there are 19) and cities (currently 144). Boroughs in Alaska play a role very similar to Counties in 48 other states and Parishes in Louisiana. Owing to the state's low population density, most of the land is located in the Unorganized Borough which, as the name implies, has no intermediate borough government of its own, but is administered directly by the state government. Currently (2000 census) 57.71 percent of Alaska's land area has this status; however, its population comprises only 13.05 percent of the state's total. For statistical purposes the United States Census Bureau divides this territory into census areas .

Several population centers, including Anchorage and Juneau, have merged their city and borough governments because very few residents of these communities live outside the city but inside the borough. Other localities have both city governments and borough governments--borough governments provide services to less densely populated areas than city governments.

Alaska has several types of borough governments and city governments: cities are divided into home rule, first class and second class cities. Boroughs are divided into home rule, first class, second class, and third class boroughs. The difference between these levels of organization (i.e., home rule, first class, second class and so on) is that some boroughs and cities have greater responsibility to provide certain kinds of services, and greater power including greater authority to tax. In general, "home rule" governments have more responsibility and authority than first class governments, first class governments have more responsibility and authority than second class governments and so on. For example, home rule cities may tax property at a higher rate than second class cities (30 vs. 20 mills) but are required to provide educational services (local schools) while second class cities are not permitted to operate local schools. Home rule cities and boroughs also have greater authority in land use planning, transportation infrastructure, licensing, regulation, waste disposal, economic development, emergency medical services and so on. These differences are complicated somewhat when cities sit inside of boroughs. For example, boroughs are required to operate local schools and therefore if a first class city sits inside of a borough it is not also required to operate a local school district.

Areas where no city or borough governments have yet been established are said to sit inside "the Unorganized Borough." In these areas, state government provides most services that would otherwise be provided by cities or boroughs.

== See also ==
- Politics of Alaska
- Impeachment in Alaska
