= List of Alaska state parks =

Logo of the Alaska State Park system

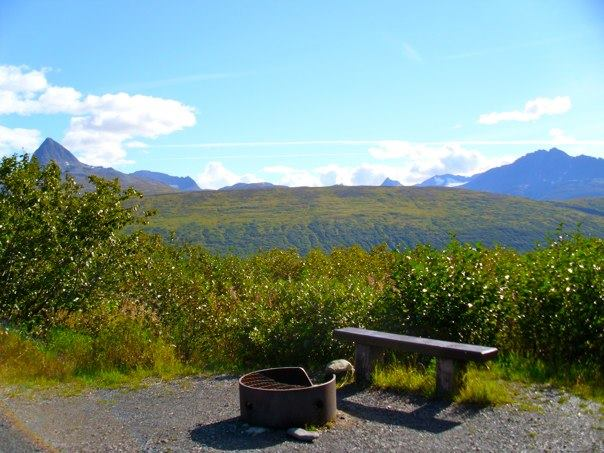
Campsite at Bluberry Lake SRS in the Chugach Mountains

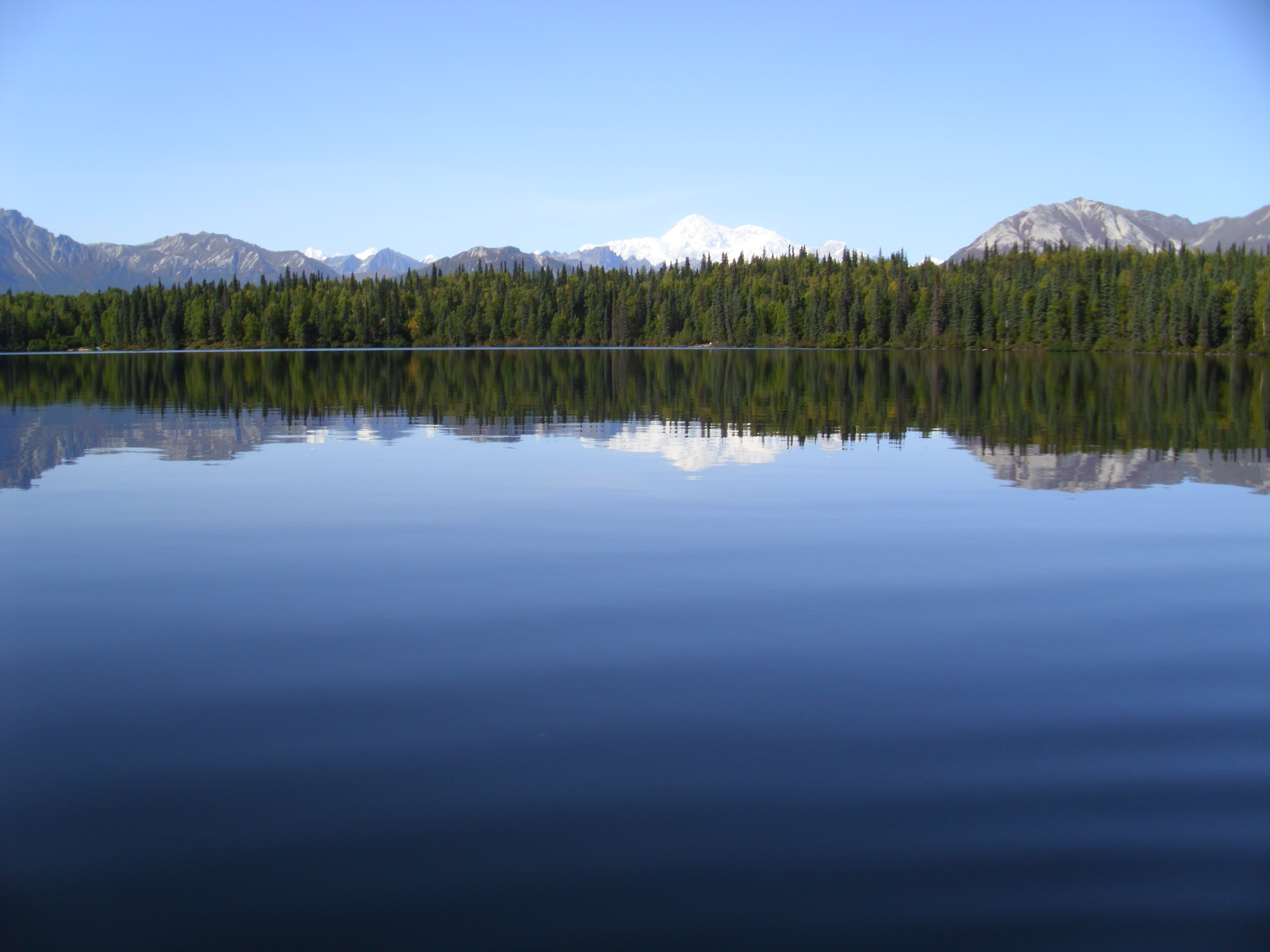
Denali seen from Denali State Park

Alaska’s state park system is managed by the Alaska Department of Natural Resources division of Parks and Outdoor Recreation. The system contains over 120 units spanning 3,427,895 acres, making it far larger than any other state park system in the United States. The State Park system began in 1970 with the creation of Denali State Park, Chugach State Park and Kachemak Bay State Park, three of the largest and still most popular parks in the state system. Wood-Tikchik State Park is the largest state park in the United States, comprising some 15% of total state park land in the nation. The division manages full state parks, state recreation areas, state recreation sites, and state historic sites.

== Anchorage area park ==
- Chugach State Park

== Copper River Basin area parks ==
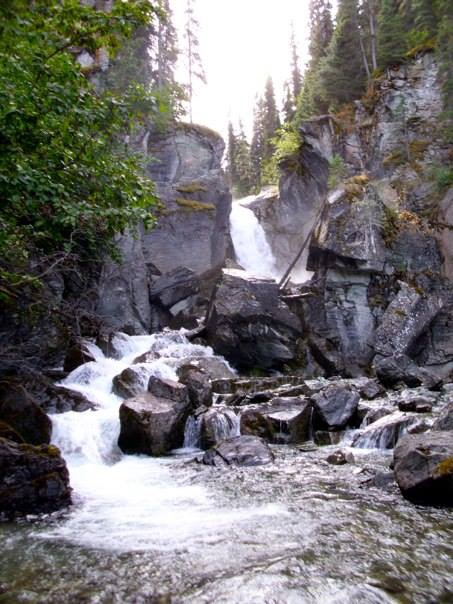
Liberty Falls

- Dry Creek State Recreation Site
- Lake Louise State Recreation Area
- Liberty Falls State Recreation Site
- Porcupine Creek State Recreation Site
- Squirrel Creek State Recreation Site

== Interior Alaska parks ==
- Fairbanks area
  - Birch Lake State Recreation Site
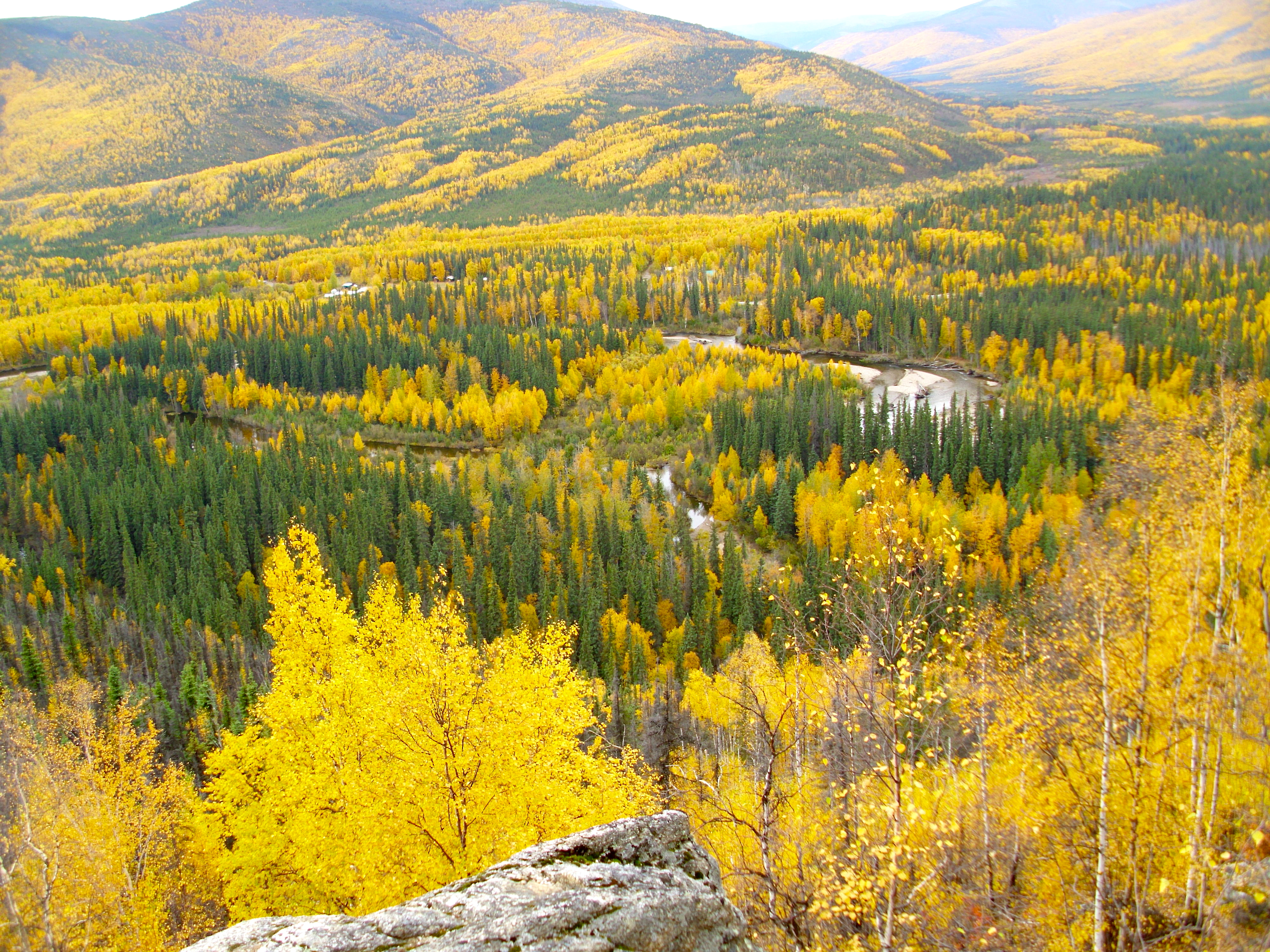
    Chena River SRA in autumn, seen from the "Angel Rocks" trail
  - Chena River State Recreation Area
  - Chena River State Recreation Site
  - Harding Lake State Recreation Area
  - Lower Chatanika River State Recreation Area
  - Salcha River State Recreation Site
  - Upper Chatanika River State Recreation Site
- Delta Junction area
  - Big Delta State Historical Park
  - Clearwater State Recreation Site
  - Delta State Recreation Site
  - Donnelly Creek State Recreation Site
  - Fielding Lake State Recreation Site
  - Quartz Lake State Recreation Area
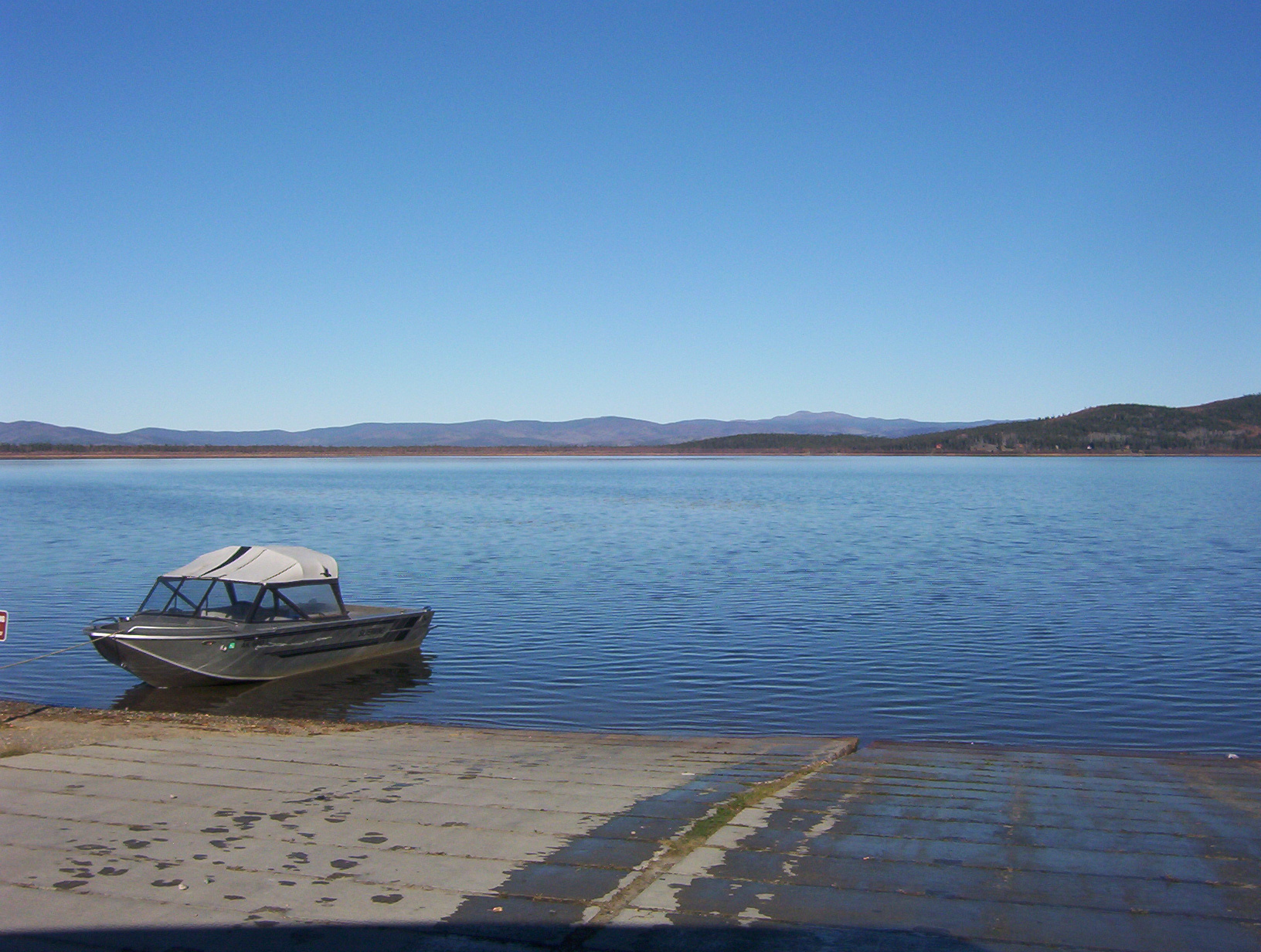
    boat launch at Quartz Lake SRA
- Tok area
  - Eagle Trail State Recreation Site
  - Moon Lake State Recreation Site
  - Tok River State Recreation Site

== Kenai Peninsula area parks ==
- Homer area
  - Anchor River State Recreation Area
  - Deep Creek State Recreation Area
  - Diamond Creek State Recreation Area
  - Stariski State Recreation Site
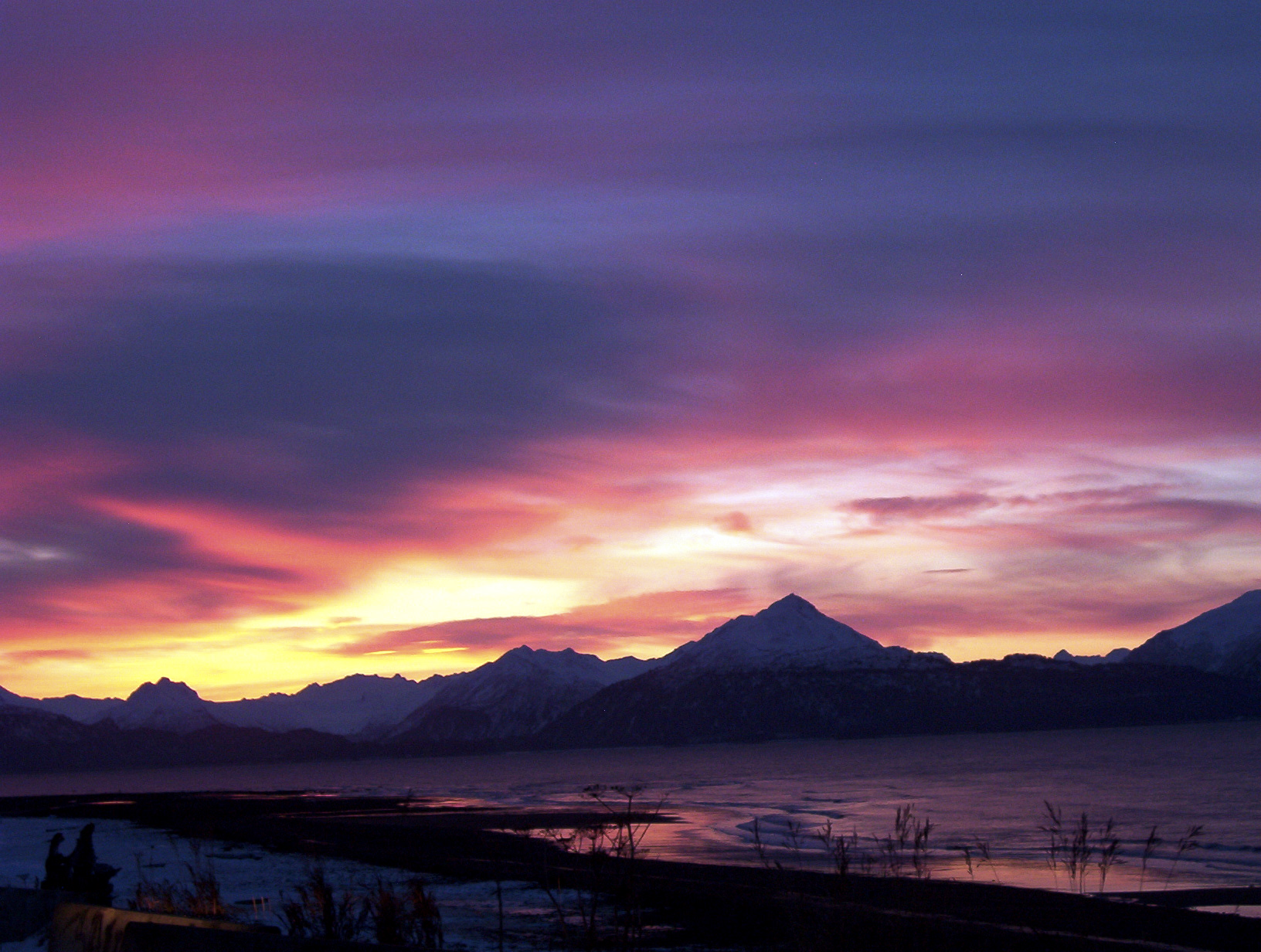
    Kachemak Bay
  - Kachemak Bay State Park and Kachemak Bay State Wilderness Park
  - Ninilchik State Recreation Area
- Kenai/Soldotna area
  - Captain Cook State Recreation Area
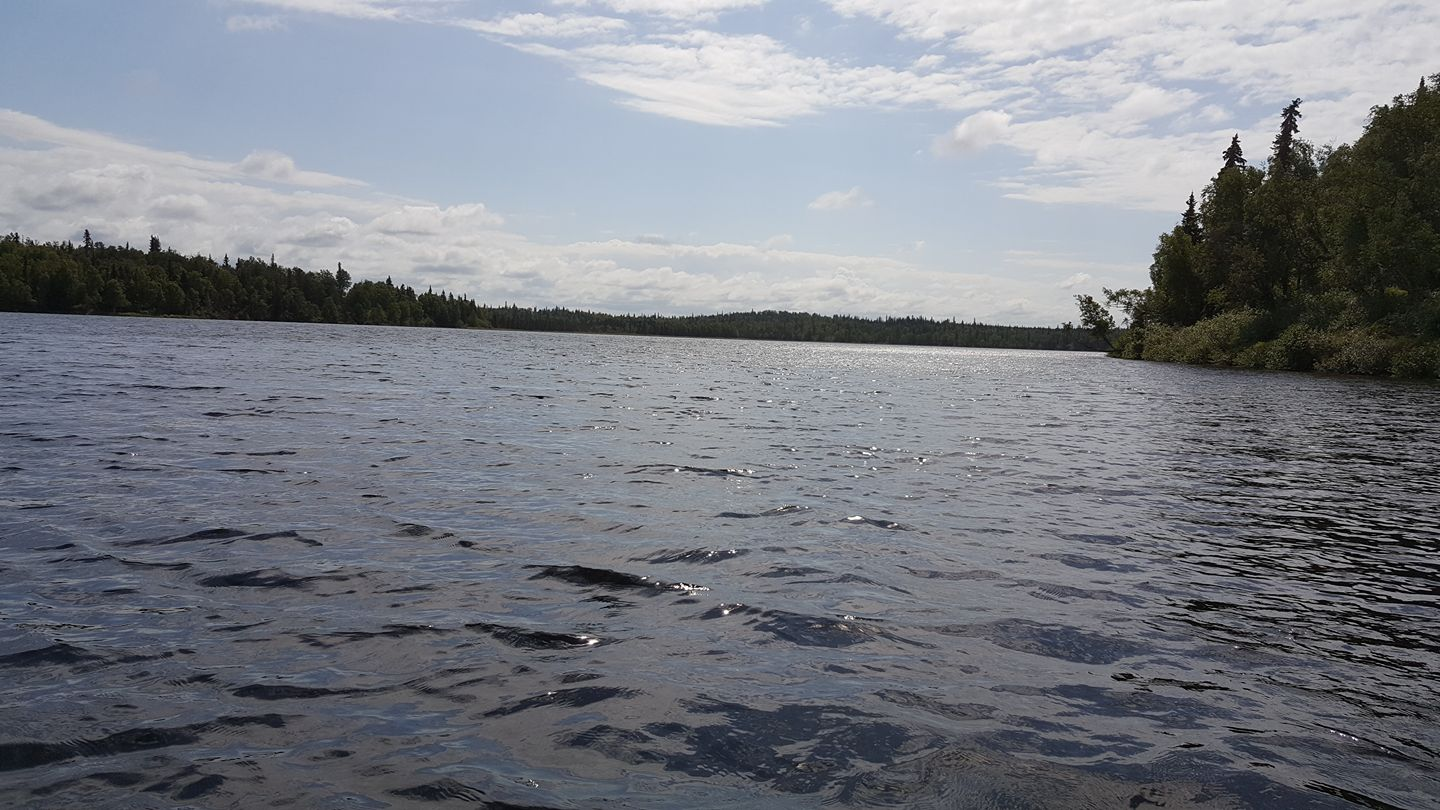
    Stormy Lake at Captain Cook SRA
  - Clam Gulch State Recreation Area
  - Crooked Creek State Recreation Site
  - Johnson Lake State Recreation Area
  - Kasilof River State Recreation Site
  - Kenai River Special Management Area
  - Morgan’s Landing State Recreation Area
  - Scout Lake State Recreation Site
- Seward area
  - Caines Head State Recreation Area
  - Driftwood Bay State Marine Park
  - Lowell Point State Recreation Site
  - Safety Cove State Marine Park
  - Sandspit Point State Marine Park
  - Sunny Cove State Marine Park
  - Thumb Cove State Marine Park

== Kodiak Island area parks ==
- Afognak Island State Park
- Buskin River State Recreation Site
- Fort Abercrombie State Historical Park
- Pasagshak River State Recreation Site
- Shuyak Island State Park
- Woody Island State Recreation Site

== Matanuska-Susitna Valley area parks ==
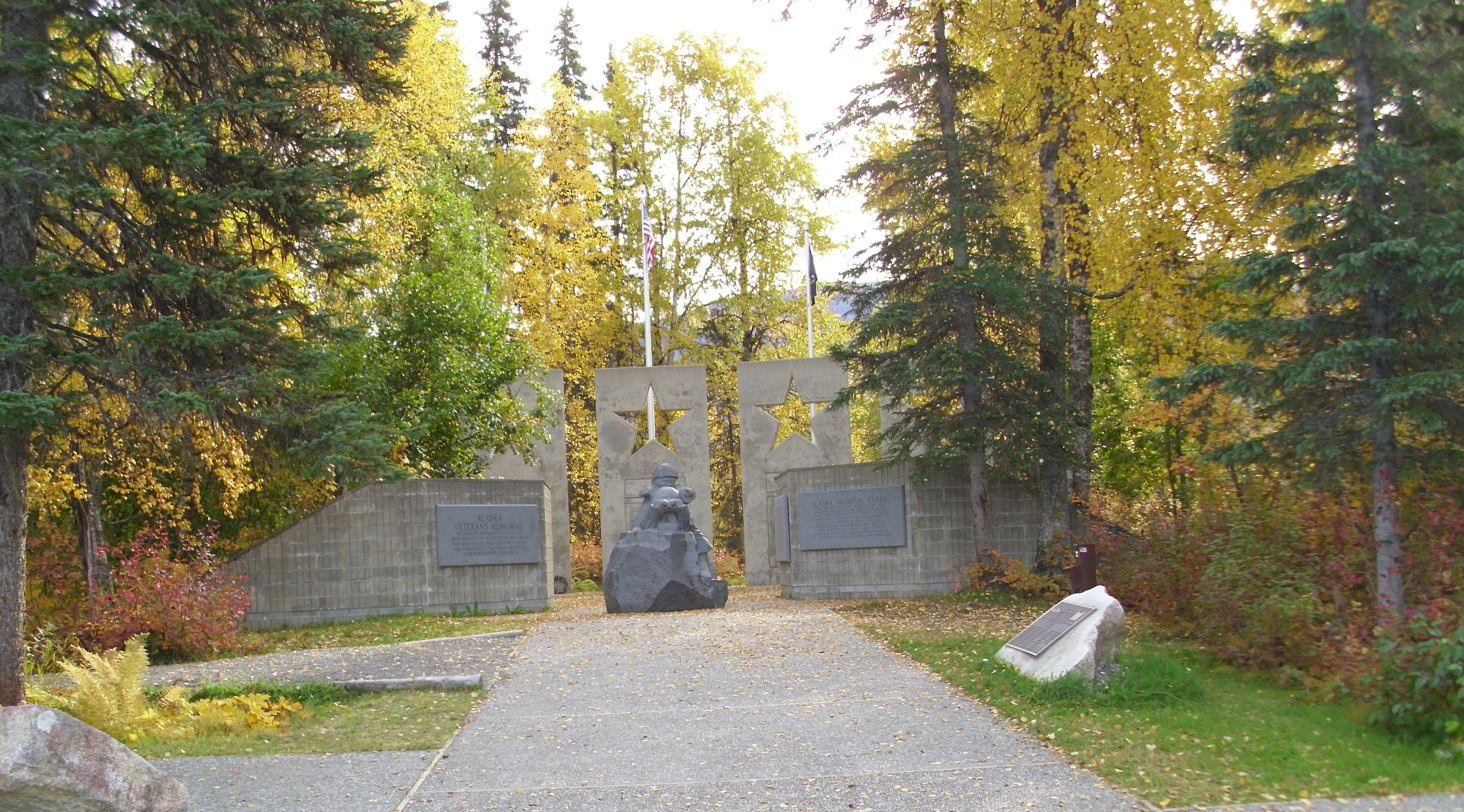
The Alaska Veterans Memorial is located near Byers Lake in Denali State Park

- Big Lake North State Recreation Area
- Big Lake South State Recreation Site
- Blair Lake State Recreation Site
- Denali State Park

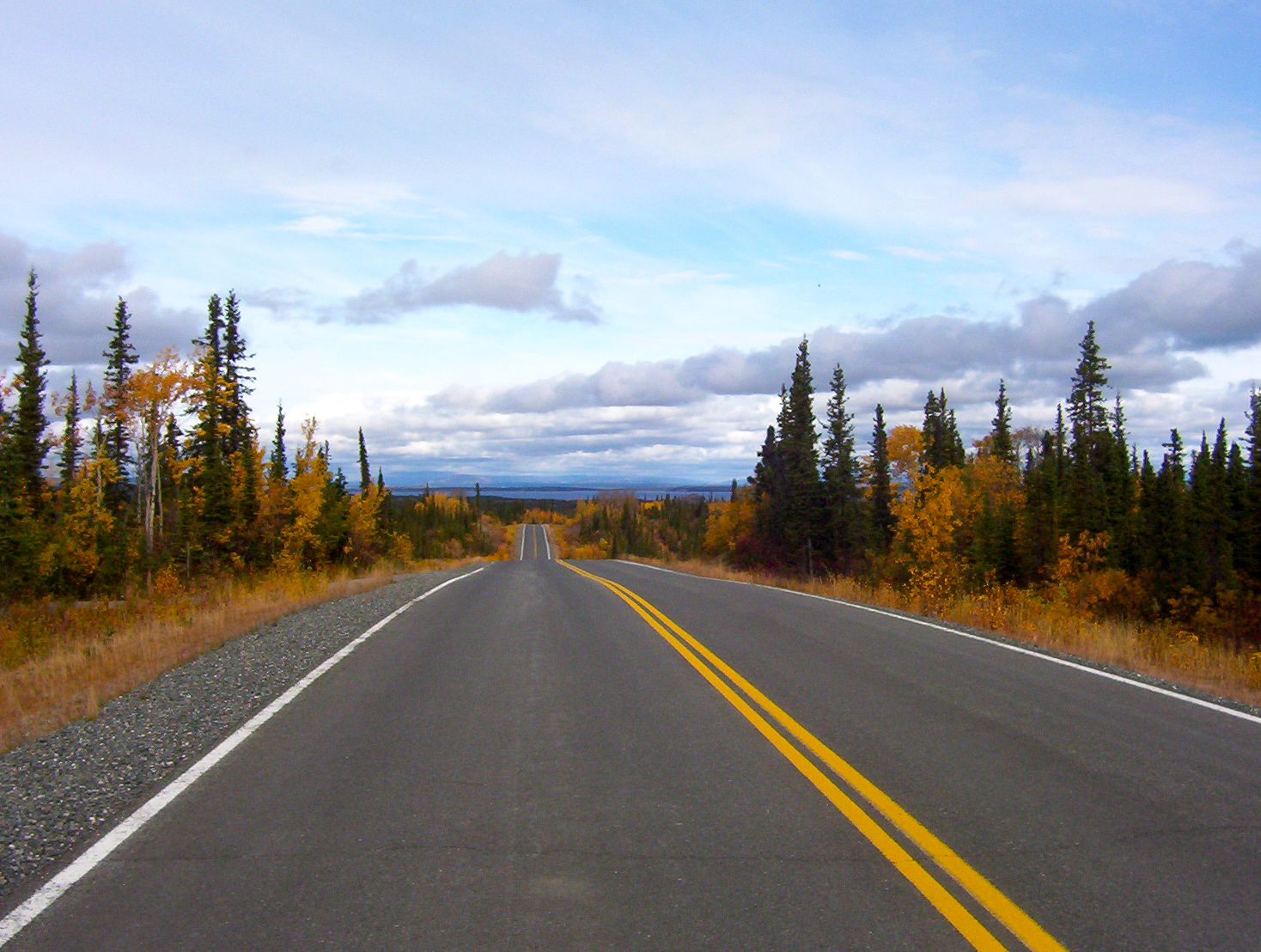
Lake Louise SRA

- Lake Louise State Recreation Area
- Nancy Lake State Recreation Area
- Nancy Lake State Recreation Site
- Finger Lake State Recreation Area
- Hatcher Pass East Special Management Area
- Independence Mine State Historical Park
- Matanuska Lakes State Recreation Area
- King Mountain State Recreation Site

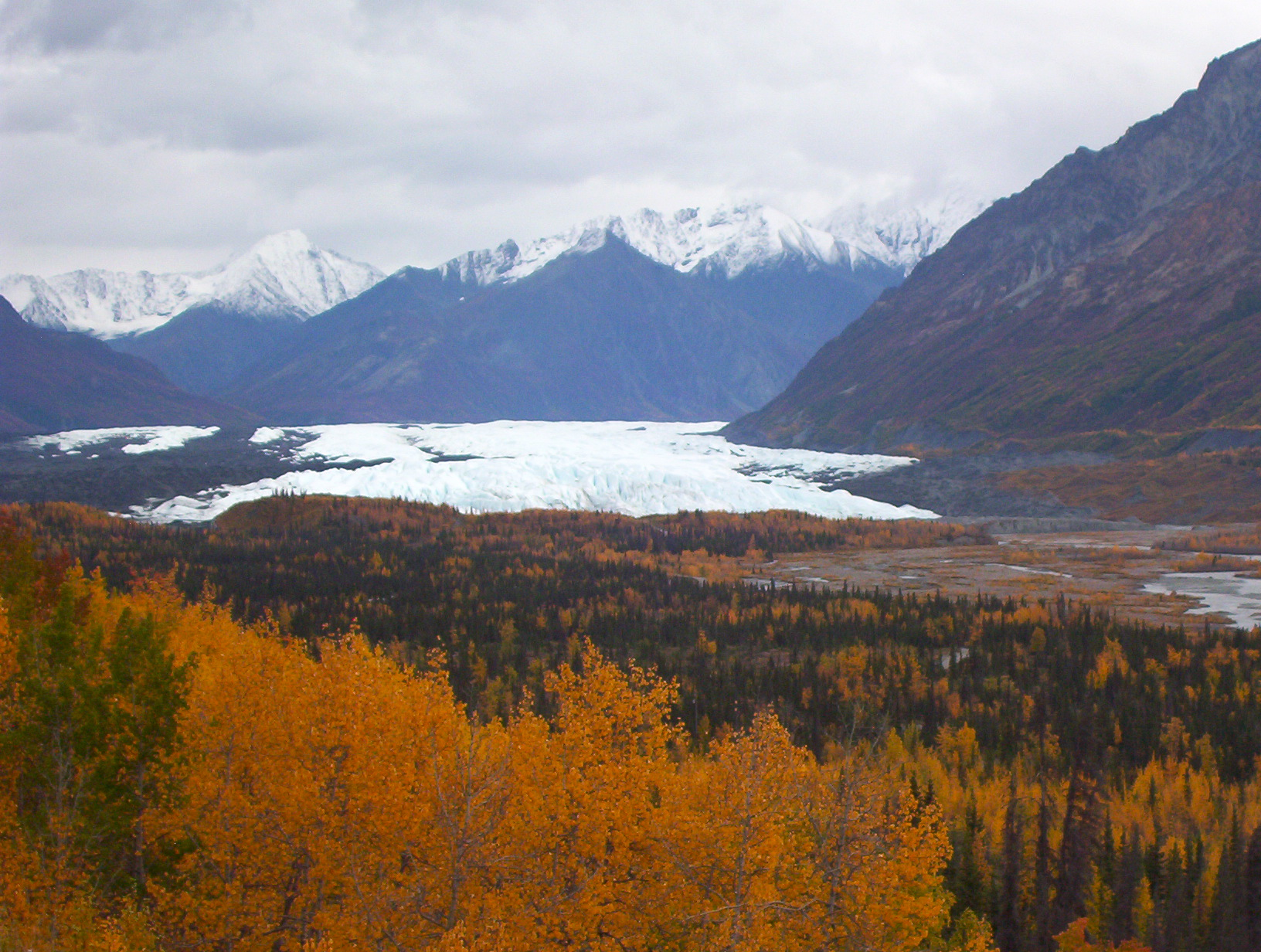
Matanuska Glacier seen from the SRA

- Matanuska Glacier State Recreation Site
- Montana Creek State Recreation Site
- Rocky Lake State Recreation Site
- Summit Lake State Recreation Site
- Tokositna River State Recreation Site
- Willow Creek State Recreation Area

== Prince William Sound area parks ==
- Bettles Bay State Marine Park

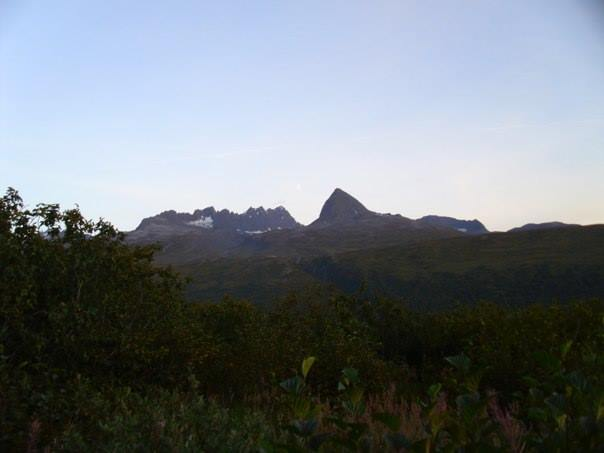
View from Blueberry Lake SRS

- Blueberry Lake State Recreation Site
- Boswell Bay Beaches State Marine Park
- Canoe Passage State Marine Park
- Decision Point State Marine Park
- Entry Cove State Marine Park
- Granite Bay State Marine Park
- Horseshoe Bay State Marine Park
- Jack Bay State Marine Park
- Kayak Island State Marine Park
- Sawmill Bay State Marine Park
- Shoup Bay State Marine Park
- South Esther Island State Marine Park
- Surprise Cove State Marine Park
- Surprise Ridge State Marine Park

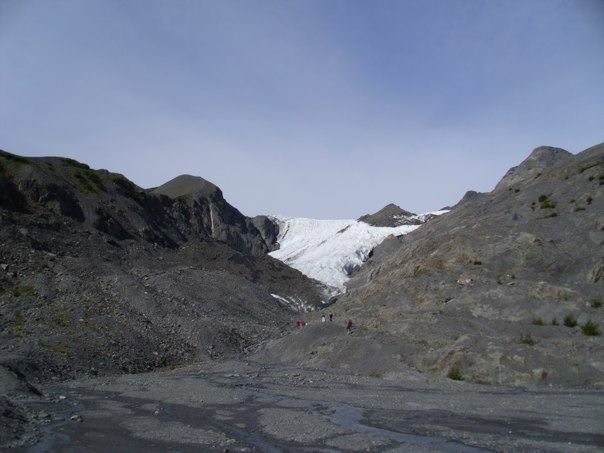
Worthington Glacier SRS

- Worthington Glacier State Recreation Site
- Ziegler Cove State Marine Park

== Southeast Alaska parks ==
- Haines/Skagway area
  - Alaska Chilkat Bald Eagle Preserve
  - Chilkat Islands State Marine Park
  - Chilkat State Park
  - Chilkoot Lake State Recreation Site
  - Mosquito Lake State Recreation Site
  - Portage Cove State Recreation Site
  - Sullivan Island State Marine Park
- Juneau area
  - Eagle Beach State Recreation Area
  - Ernest Gruening State Historical Park
  - Funter Bay State Marine Park
  - Juneau Trail System
  - Oliver Inlet State Marine Park
  - Point Bridget State Park
  - Shelter Island State Marine Park
  - St. James Bay State Marine Park
  - Taku Harbor State Marine Park
  - Wickersham State Historic Site
- Ketchikan area
  - Black Sands Beach State Marine Park
  - Dall Bay State Marine Park
  - Grindall Island State Marine Park
  - Refuge Cove State Recreation Site
  - Settlers Cove State Recreation Site
  - Totem Bight State Historical Park
- Sitka area
  - Baranof Castle Hill State Historic Site
  - Big Bear/Baby Bear State Marine Park
  - Halibut Point State Recreation Site
  - Magoun Islands State Marine Park
  - Old Sitka State Historical Park
  - Sealion Cove State Marine Park
  - Security Bay State Marine Park
- Wrangell/Petersburg area
  - Beecher Pass State Marine Park
  - Joe Mace Island State Marine Park
  - Petroglyph Beach State Historic Site
  - Thoms Place State Marine Park

== Southwest Alaska parks ==
- Lake Aleknagik State Recreation Site
- Wood-Tikchik State Park

== See also ==
List of Alaska Wildlife Management Areas
