= Department of Labor and Workforce Development =

Department of Labor and Workforce Development may refer to:

- Alaska Department of Labor and Workforce Development
- California Labor and Workforce Development Agency
- New Jersey Department of Labor and Workforce Development
