= UAA College of Education =

College at the University of Alaska Anchorage

The UAA School of Education is a college at the University of Alaska Anchorage.

The college offers undergraduate programs in early childhood education and master's programs in teaching and learning, educational leadership, language and literacy education, indigenizing education, and special education. It is one of two institutions providing school-administrator training in the State of Alaska.

The college's advanced licensure programs fully accredited through Dec 2028 by the Council for the Accreditation of Educator Preparation (CAEP). As of 2022, the program is provisionally approved to recommend graduates for PK-3 licensure by Alaska Department of Education & Early Development.
