= Alaska Oil and Gas Conservation Commission =

American quasi-judicial agency

The Alaska Oil and Gas Conservation Commission (AOGCC) is a quasi-judicial agency in the U.S. state of Alaska, within the Alaska Department of Administration. It was originally established in 1955, was subsequently abolished in 1959, but was eventually reestablished in 1968. This commission is responsible for overseeing oil and gas drilling and production, reservoir depletion, and certain other operations on private and state-owned lands in Alaska.

== History ==
A territorial statute created the Alaska Oil and Gas Conservation Commission in 1955, before Alaska became a state in 1959. At that time, the Commission comprised the Territorial Governor, Commissioner of Mines, and Highway Engineer. Rules and regulations for the Commission's activities took effect in 1958.

In 1959, the Oil and Gas Conservation Commission was temporarily abolished, and its duties were transferred to the Alaska Department of Natural Resources. In 1968, the Division of Oil and Gas was formed within the Department of Natural Resources. In 1976, the word "conservation" was added back to the division's title, and it became the Division of Oil and Gas Conservation.

In 1977, with oil production occurring in Prudhoe Bay, the Alaska Legislature decided that an independent quasi-judicial agency should be created in the executive branch of the state. This independent agency was still located within the Alaska Department of Natural Resources, until in 1980 it was transferred to the Alaska Department of Commerce, Community, and Economic Development.

In 1994, it was transferred to the Alaska Department of Administration.

== Structure ==
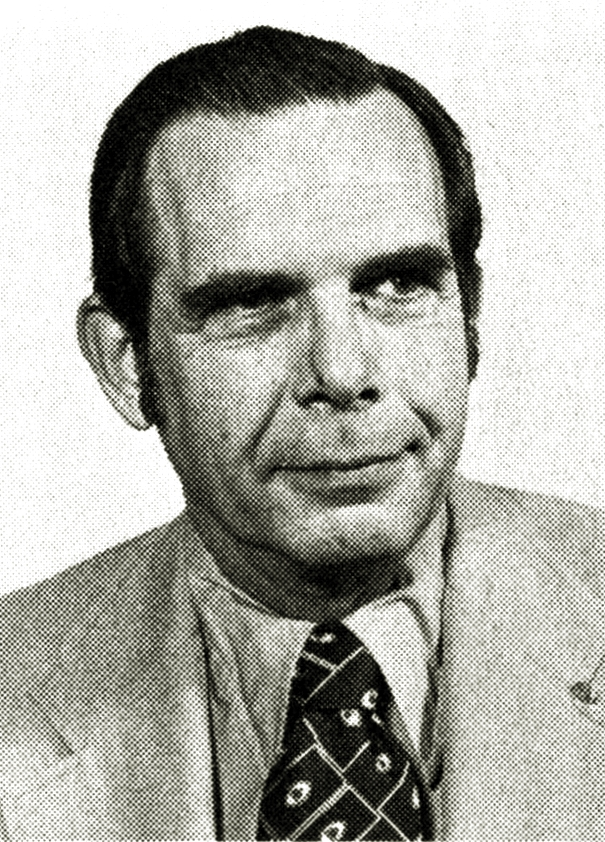
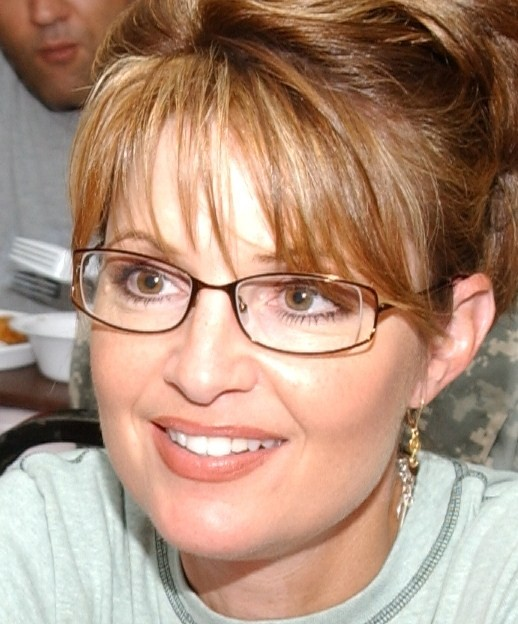
Past commission members include Clarence V. "Chat" Chatterton (petroleum engineer member, 1982–1990) and Sarah Palin (public member, 2003–2004).

The structure of the membership has changed throughout the years, though it has consistently been a three-person Commission.

Under the structure, adopted in 1979, one member must be a registered petroleum engineer, one member must be a registered geologist, and one member must represent the public at large i.e., a citizen in neither of the two categories listed above.

== Mission ==
The Commission website lists their primary mission as "To protect the public interest in exploration and development of Alaska's valuable oil, gas, and geothermal resources through the application of conservation practices designed to ensure greater ultimate recovery and the protection of health, safety, fresh ground waters and the rights of all owners to recover their share of the resource."

The Commission is tasked to work in-hand with the oil industry to maximize oil production, administer correlative rights, and improve resource recovery.

It administers an underground injection program for enhanced oil recovery and the underground disposal of oil field waste, as authorized by the U.S. Environmental Protection Agency. As part of this injection process, oil corporations must obtain an Aquifer Exemption Order granted by the AOGCC in areas with deep groundwater supplies. The Commission holds oversight of wastewater disposal known as "wastewater drain fields"; as such, oil corporations are permitted to dispose of wastewater in the soil when certain requirements are met, and reject Orders when not met. Additionally, the Commission adjudicates certain oil and gas disputes between owners, including disputes where the state is a party. It is designed to cooperate with industry, while still meeting its regulatory requirements.

== Environmental concerns ==
Some environmental groups such as the Cook Inletkeeper as well as First Nation people have contested these Aquifer Exemption Order, as they are concerned they may contaminate groundwater supplies.

The Cook Inletkeeper website notes 2 billion US gallons (7,600,000 m^{3}) of toxic waste are disposed of in the Cook Inlet waterway every year by oil corporations.
