= Afognak Island State Park =

State park in Alaska, United States

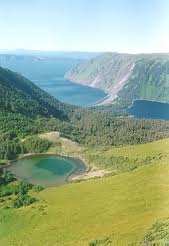

- Location within Alaska
- Location: Kodiak Island Borough, Alaska, United States
- Coordinates: 58°21′12″N 152°18′21″W
- Area: 75,047 acres (30,370 ha)
- Elevation: 161 ft (49 m)
- Established: 1892 & 1994
- Administrator: Alaska Department of Natural Resources
- Website: Official website

Afognak Island State Park is a 75,047-acre (30,370 ha) Alaska state park on Afognak Island in Kodiak Island Borough, Alaska in the United States. Afognak Island is northeast of Kodiak Island on the Alaska Peninsula. Most of Afognak Island State Park is undeveloped. The park is known for its rugged topography and wide variety of wildlife. Afognak Island State Park is open to year-round recreation, including fishing, hunting, and hiking. Transportation is provided by float plane from Kodiak to various areas around the park. It is on the northern and eastern ends of the island and surrounds Perenosa, Seal and Tonki Bays. It borders part of Kodiak National Wildlife Refuge to the west.

== History ==
What is now known as Afognak Island State Park was established as the first conservation areas in the United States in 1892, sixty-seven years before Alaska became the 49th state. It then called the Afognak Island Forest and Fish Culture Reserve. This classification allowed for the conservation of wildlife and salmon habitat. It was reclassified in 1908 as part of Chugach National Forest. The property was transferred in 1980 to native corporations as part of the Alaska Native Claims Settlement Act. The establishment of Afognak Island State Park occurred in 1994 when 41,549 acres (168.14 km^{2}) were sold to the state as parklands to restore and protect habitat in the wake of the Exxon Valdez Oil Spill. An additional 33,498 acres (135.56 km^{2}) were added to the park in 2001 with funding from the Valdez case to protect more habitat.

== Ecology ==
Afognak Island State Park is in near pristine condition. Just a small section of the park near Seal Bay was logged in the 1990s. The park is home to an old-growth forest of Sitka spruce and provides spawning grounds for a variety of salmon. Sitka deer, Kodiak bear, Roosevelt elk and marbled murrelet are just a few of the animals that can be seen at the park.

== Recreation ==
There are two cabins available for rent at Afognak Island State Park. Pillar Lake Cabin and Laura Lake Cabin are near their namesake lakes. The lakes are remote. Pillar Lake Cabin is a 20-minute floatplane flight from Kodiak. Once Pillar Lake freezes the cabin is not accessible until the lake thaws. There are no developed trails in the Pillar Lake area. A beach on the ocean is a short distance away. Dolly Varden trout are found in the lake. There are no salmon streams in the area.

Laura Lake Cabin is a 35-minute flight from Kodiak. It is on the northern edge of the island near Pauls Bay. Once Laura Lake freezes the cabin is not accessible until the lake thaws. Laura Lake is a three-mile-long (5 km) lake that is at the center of a productive salmon-spawning system. The spawning salmon attract bears that must be avoided for safety reasons.
