= Harding-Birch Lakes, Alaska =

- Census-designated place
- Location within Fairbanks North Star Borough and the state of Alaska
- Coordinates: 64°19′57″N 146°46′47″W
- Country: United States
- State: Alaska
- Borough: Fairbanks North Star

Government
  - Borough mayor: Bryce J. Ward
  - State senator: Robert Myers (R)
  - State rep.: Frank Tomaszewski (R)

Area
  - Total: 231.24 sq mi (598.91 km^{2})
  - Land: 214.15 sq mi (554.65 km^{2})
  - Water: 17.09 sq mi (44.26 km^{2})
- Elevation: 975 ft (297 m)

Population (2020)
  - Total: 253
  - Density: 1.2/sq mi (0.46/km^{2})
- Time zone: UTC-9 (Alaska (AKST))
  - Summer (DST): UTC-8 (AKDT)
- ZIP code: 99714
- Area code: 907
- FIPS code: 02-31765

Harding-Birch Lakes is a census-designated place (CDP) in Fairbanks North Star Borough, Alaska, United States. It is part of the Fairbanks, Alaska Metropolitan Statistical Area. As of the 2020 census, Harding-Birch Lakes had a population of 253.

== Geography ==
Harding-Birch Lakes is located at 64°19′57″N 146°46′47″W.

According to the United States Census Bureau, the CDP has a total area of 231.2 square miles (598.9 km^{2}), of which 214.4 square miles (555.2 km^{2}) is land and 16.9 square miles (43.7 km^{2}), or 7.30%, is water.

== Demographics ==
Historical population
Census	Pop.	Note	%±
1980	38		—
1990	27		−28.9%
2000	216		700.0%
2010	299		38.4%
2020	253		−15.4%
U.S. Decennial Census

Harding-Birch Lakes first appeared on the 1980 U.S. Census as Harding Lake, a census-designated place (CDP) centered on the lake of the same name. It reported again as the same in 1990. In 2000, the CDP was greatly expanded to the southern border of Fairbanks North Star Borough and renamed Harding-Birch Lakes.

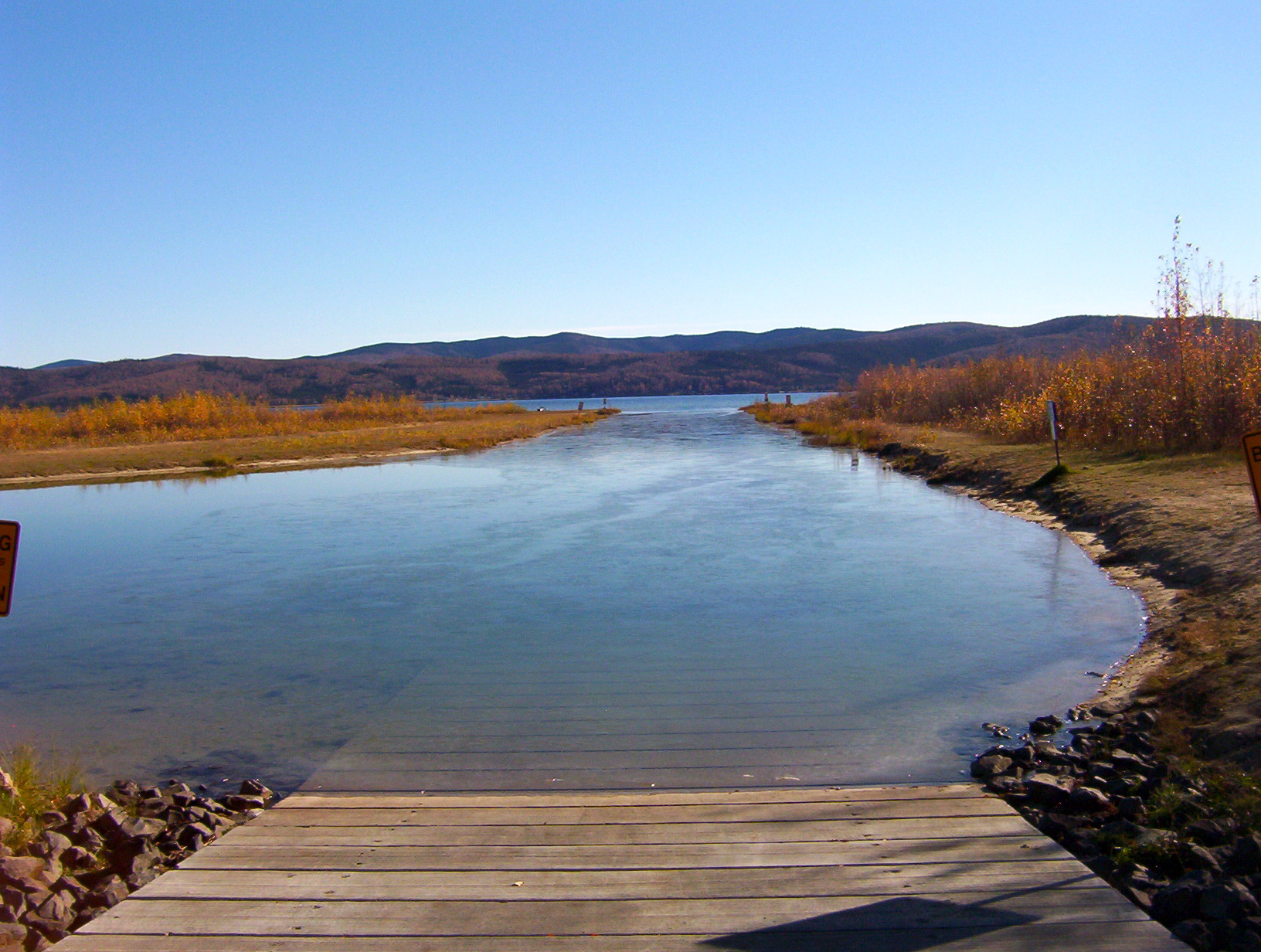
Boat launch at Harding Lake State Recreation Area

As of the census of 2000, there were 216 people, 98 households, and 63 families residing in the CDP. The population density was 1 person per square mile (0.4/km^{2}). There were 489 housing units at an average density of 2.2 per square mile (0.85/km^{2}). The racial makeup of the CDP was 93.52% White, 1.39% from other races, and 5.09% from two or more races. 0.46% of the population were Hispanic or Latino of any race.

There were 98 households, out of which 21.4% had children under the age of 18 living with them, 54.1% were married couples living together, 6.1% had a female householder with no husband present, and 35.7% were non-families. 31.6% of all households were made up of individuals, and 7.1% had someone living alone who was 65 years of age or older. The average household size was 2.20 and the average family size was 2.75.

In the CDP, the population was spread out, with 21.8% under the age of 18, 6.0% from 18 to 24, 24.5% from 25 to 44, 34.3% from 45 to 64, and 13.4% who were 65 years of age or older. The median age was 44 years. For every 100 females, there were 118.2 males. For every 100 females age 18 and over, there were 128.4 males.

The median income for a household in the CDP was $43,438, and the median income for a family was $60,288. Males had a median income of $36,042 versus $23,750 for females. The per capita income for the CDP was $24,443. None of the families and none of the population were living below the poverty line.

== See also ==
- Harding Lake and Birch Lake the two lakes that gives the CDP its name
