= Petroleum Systems Integrity Office =

The Petroleum Systems Integrity Office is organized within the Division of Oil and Gas, a part of the Alaska Department of Natural Resources. This office was created by Administrative Order #234 on April 18, 2007 by the-then Governor, Sarah Palin.
