= Harding Lake =

Lake in the state of Alaska, United States

- Salchaket Lake
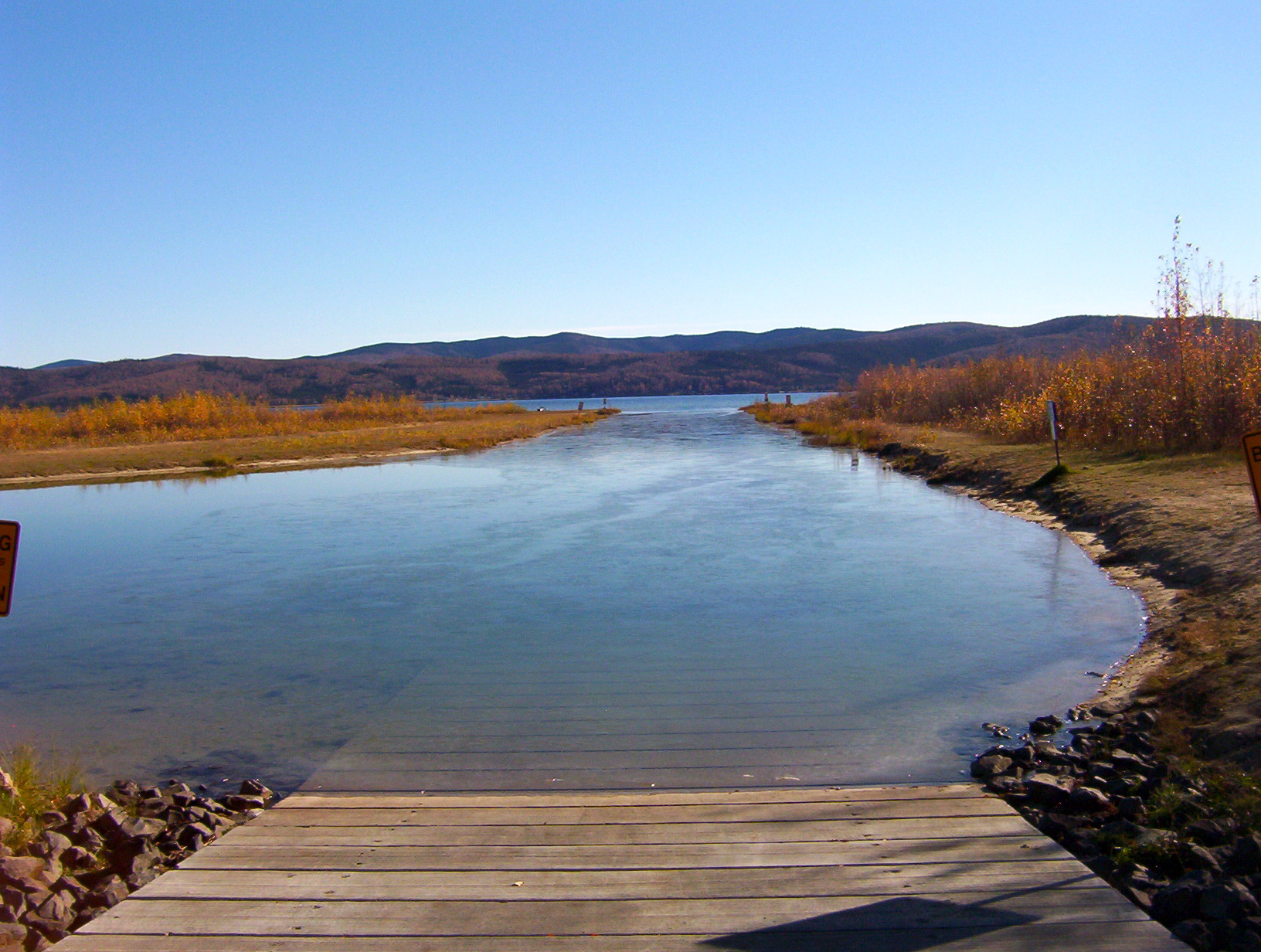
- View from boat launch, in a lagoon at the State Recreation Area

- Location within Alaska Location within North America
- Coordinates: 64°25′21″N 146°51′16″W
- Primary inflows: 3 small, unnamed creeks
- Primary outflows: 1 unnamed creek
- Basin countries: United States
- Surface area: 887.2 ha (2,192.3 acres)
- Max. depth: 43.0 m (141.1 ft.)
- Shore length^{1}: 11.9 km (7.4 mi.)
- Surface elevation: 218 m (715 ft)
- Frozen: late autumn to late spring
- Settlements: Harding-Birch Lakes, Salcha
- ^{1} Shore length is not a well-defined measure.

Harding Lake is a lake in the Fairbanks North Star Borough in Interior Alaska. It is named for President Warren G. Harding, who visited Alaska just before he died. Prior to that it was known as Salchaket Lake Access to the lake is via the Richardson Highway

== Fish species ==
The lake contains a wide variety of native and stocked fish, including Arctic char, burbot, Arctic grayling, and northern pike, as well as several salmon and trout species. Anglers are advised to check current regulations with the Alaska Department of Fish and Game before fishing.

== Recreation Area ==
The lake is home to the Harding Lake State Recreation Area a 325 acres (132 ha) park which features a large campground, boat launch, and facilities for sports and outdoor games. This is one of the oldest units in the Alaska State Park system, having been founded in 1967, before the formal state park network was even in place.
