= Decision Point State Marine Park =

- Location within Alaska
- Location: Passage Canal
- Nearest city: Whittier
- Coordinates: 60°48′6″N 148°28′53″W
- Area: 460 acres (190 ha)
- Established: June 14, 1990
- Governing body: Alaska Division of Parks and Outdoor Recreation
- Website: Decision Point State Marine Park

Decision Point State Marine Park is a 460-acre Alaska state marine park located at the eastern end of Passage Canal. The park is named because one decides at this point whether to head out into Port Wells. There is no road access to the park.

Popular activities include kayaking, boating, fishing, and camping. There are two camping beaches.

There are many species in the park. Sea animals that can be observed in the park include sea otters, seals, porpoise, and whales. Land animals include moose, black bear, mountain goats, coyotes, and wolves. Birds include eagles, gyrfalcons, and puffins.

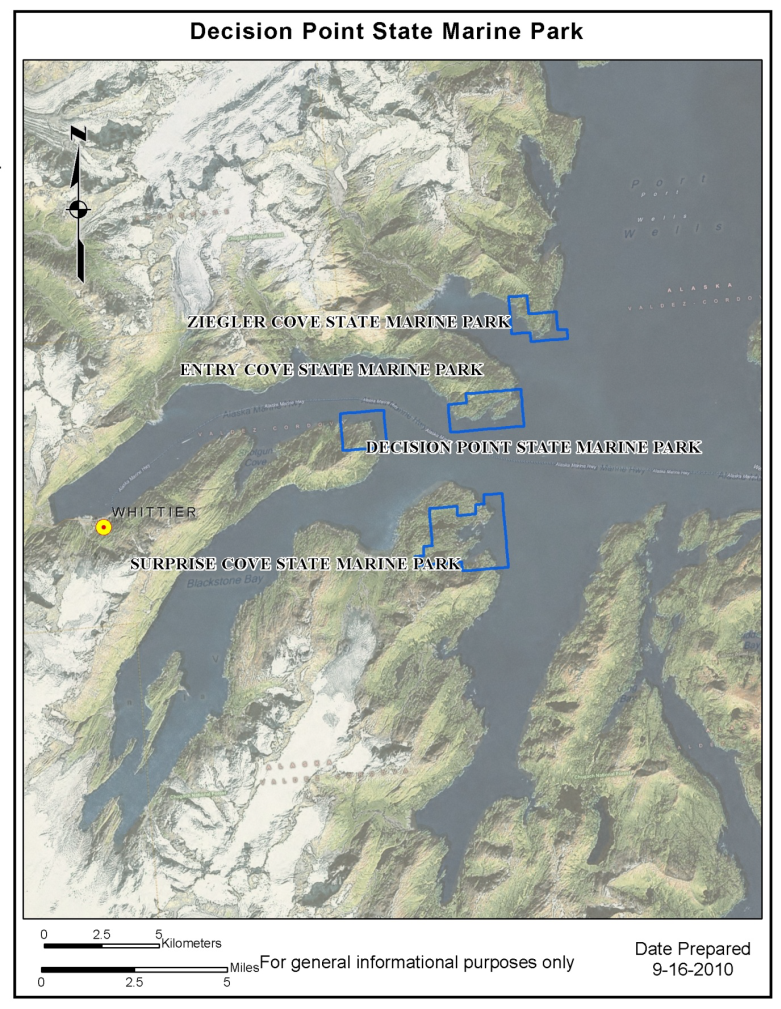
Map of Decision Point State Marine park and surrounding areas.

There is a public use cabin that can host eight guests located at Squirrel Cove. The cabin is constructed of beetle-killed, milled spruce logs. There is no freshwater source or cell phone service near the cabin. The price per night is $75.

== See also ==
- List of Alaska state parks
