= Jack Bay State Marine Park =

State park in Alaska, United States

- Jack Bay State Park
- IUCN category V (protected landscape/seascape)
- Location within Alaska
- Nearest city: Valdez
- Coordinates: 61°1′48″N 146°33′36″W
- Area: 1,544 acres (6.25 km^{2})
- Established: 1990
- Governing body: Alaska Division of Parks and Outdoor Recreation
- Website: Jack Bay State Marine Park

Jack Bay State Marine Park is a 1,544 acre (625 ha) state park in the U.S. state of Alaska near Valdez. The park covers 811 acres and is nestled in Jack Bay, about an hour's boat ride from Valdez. The park is surrounded by steep mountains and a spruce-hemlock forest. There is no road access to the park; the park is only accessible by boat or plane. Popular activities include camping, fishing, kayaking, and wildlife viewing.

The park consists of alder, muskeg, salt marsh and old growth forest of spruce and hemlock.

The park has a 12x14 rustic cabin that sleeps six.

== See also ==
- List of Alaska state parks
