= Entry Cove State Marine Park =

Marine Park in Alaska

- Location within Alaska
- Location: Passage Canal
- Nearest city: Whittier
- Coordinates: 60°48′17″N 148°21′31″W
- Area: 1,200 acres (490 ha)
- Established: June 14, 1990
- Governing body: Alaska Division of Parks and Outdoor Recreation
- Website: Entry Cove State Marine Park

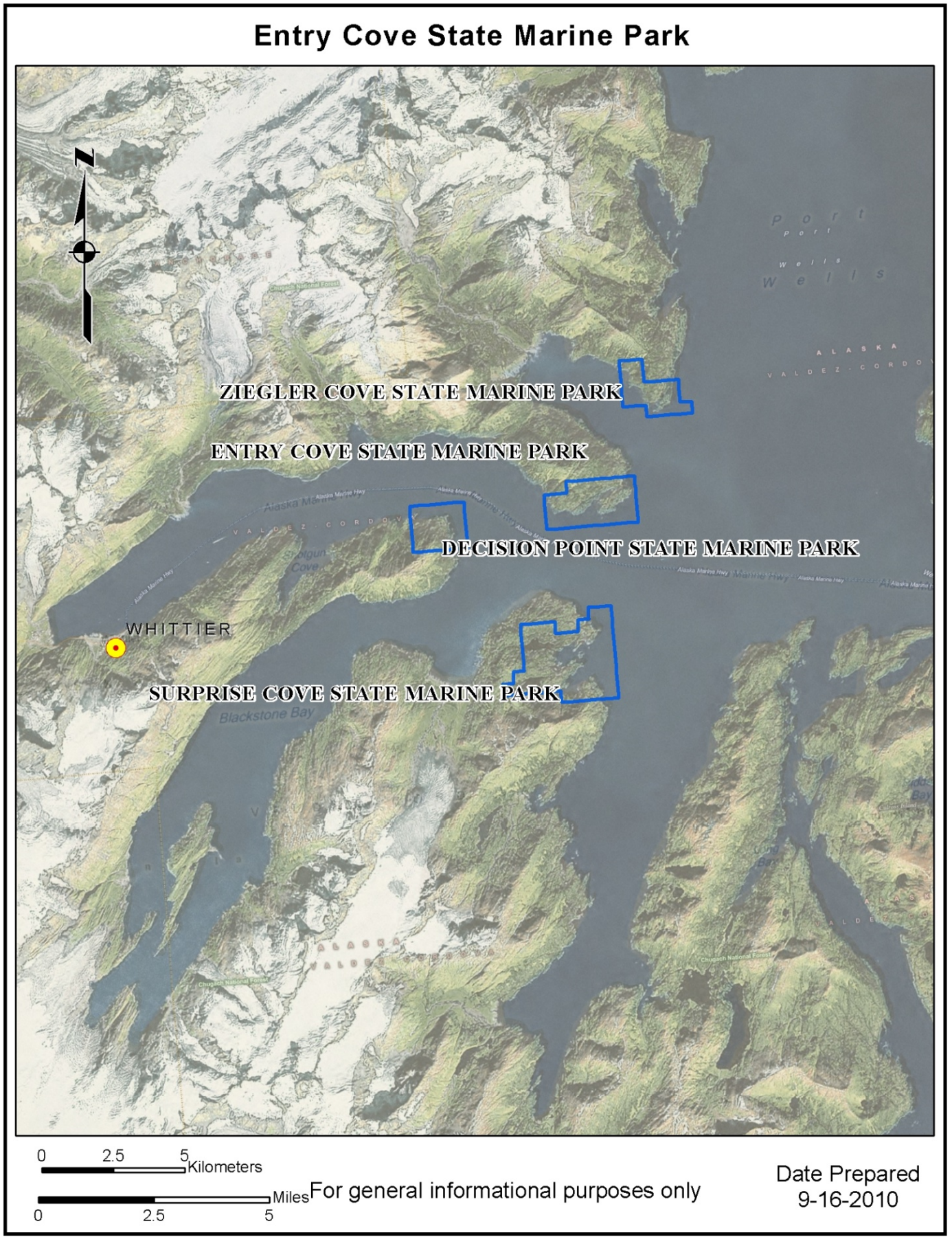
Map of Entry Cove State Marine park and surrounding areas.

Entry Cove State Marine Park is a 1,200 acres (490 hectares) state marine park in the U.S. state of Alaska. The park is two miles directly east of Decision Point on the northeast corner where Passage Canal and Port Wells meet. There is no road access to the park.

Most of the park consists of forested lowlands with scattered muskegs. The shore consists of low rocky cliffs with scattered gravel pocket beaches.

There is capacity for 10 tent sites at the head of Entry Cove. The surface is a mix of flat beach rock and moss. Water from the pond for drinking or cooking is not recommended as the pond is contaminated.

Activities include primitive tent camping and kayaking.

Special features include a natural arch located on the east shore and a beautiful view of the Tebenkof Glacier. The lagoon is a good site for clamming, but the entrance can only be accessed by small boats on full tide.

There are many habitats within the park including estuaries, eelgrass beds, and salmon spawning.

== See alao ==
- List of Alaska state parks
