= Lowell Peak (Chugach Mountains) =

Mountain in Alaska, United States

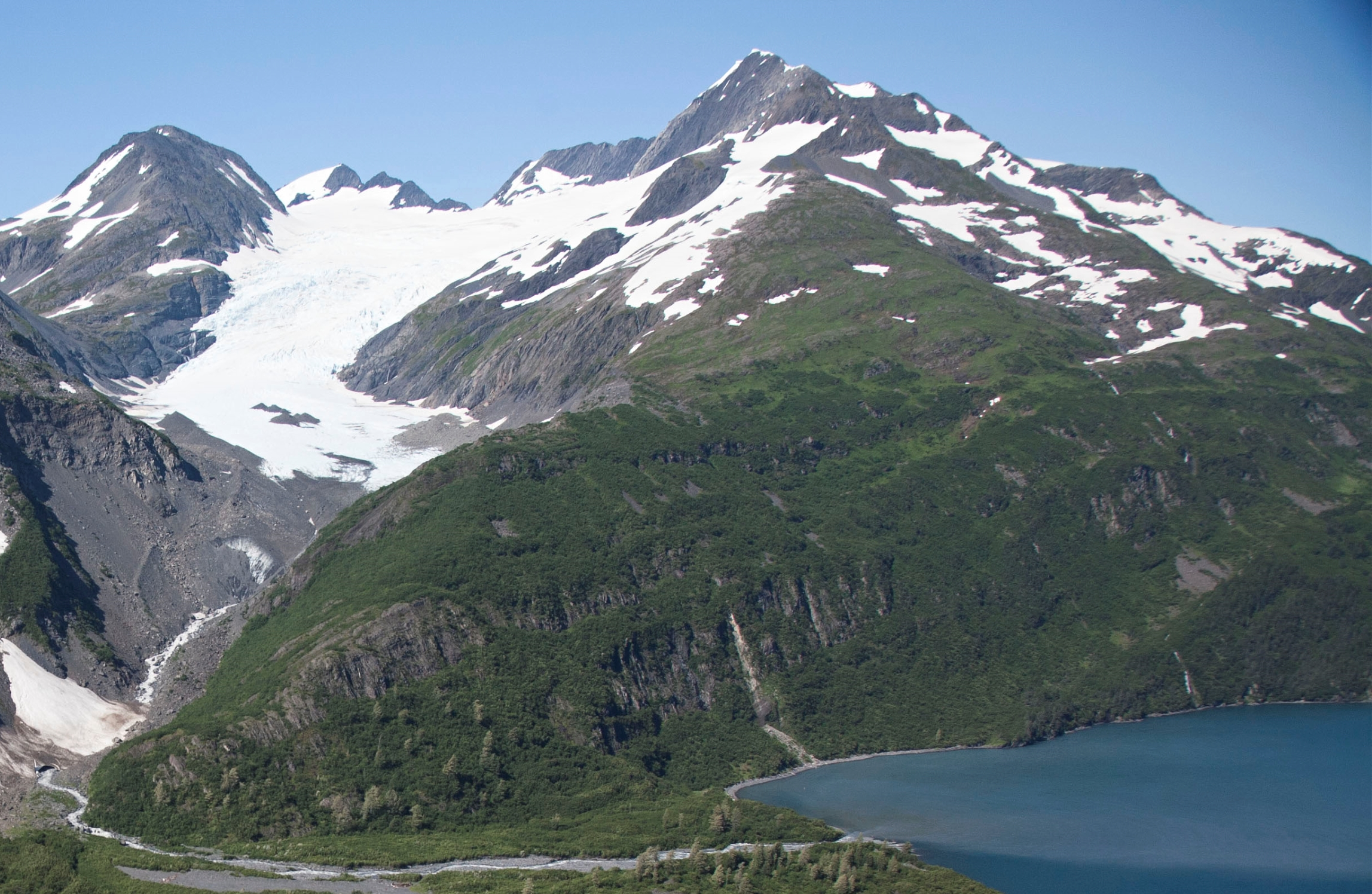
- Southwest aspect, with Learnard Glacier

Highest point
- Elevation: 4,728 ft (1,441 m)
- Prominence: 2,428 ft (740 m)
- Isolation: 5.63 mi (9.06 km)
- Coordinates: 60°49′00″N 148°41′51″W

Naming
- Etymology: James Russell Lowell

Geography
- Location within Alaska
- Interactive map of Lowell Peak
- Country: United States
- State: Alaska
- Census Area: Chugach Census Area
- Protected area: Chugach National Forest
- Parent range: Chugach Mountains
- Topo map: USGS Seward D-5

Lowell Peak is a 4,728-foot (1,441 m) mountain summit in the U.S. state of Alaska.

== Description ==
Lowell Peak is located three miles (5 km) north of Whittier, Alaska, in the Chugach Mountains, on land managed by Chugach National Forest. Nearby peaks include Maynard Mountain two miles (3 km) to the southwest, and Boggs Peak, four miles (6 km) to the west-northwest. Although modest in elevation, relief is significant as the summit rises over 4,700 feet (1,433 m) above tidewater of Passage Canal in approximately 1.5 mi (2 km). The mountain is unofficially named in association with the officially named Lowell Glacier on the north slope of the mountain which was named in 1915 by the United States Coast and Geodetic Survey after poet James Russell Lowell (1819–1891).

== Climate ==
Based on the Köppen climate classification, Lowell Peak is located in a subarctic climate zone with long, cold, snowy winters, and mild summers. Weather systems coming off the Gulf of Alaska are forced upwards by the Chugach Mountains (orographic lift), causing heavy precipitation in the form of rainfall and snowfall. Winter temperatures can drop below −10 °F with wind chill factors below −20 °F. This climate supports the Learnard Glacier on the southwest slope and Lowell Glacier on the north slope. The months May through June offer the most favorable weather for climbing or viewing.

== Gallery ==
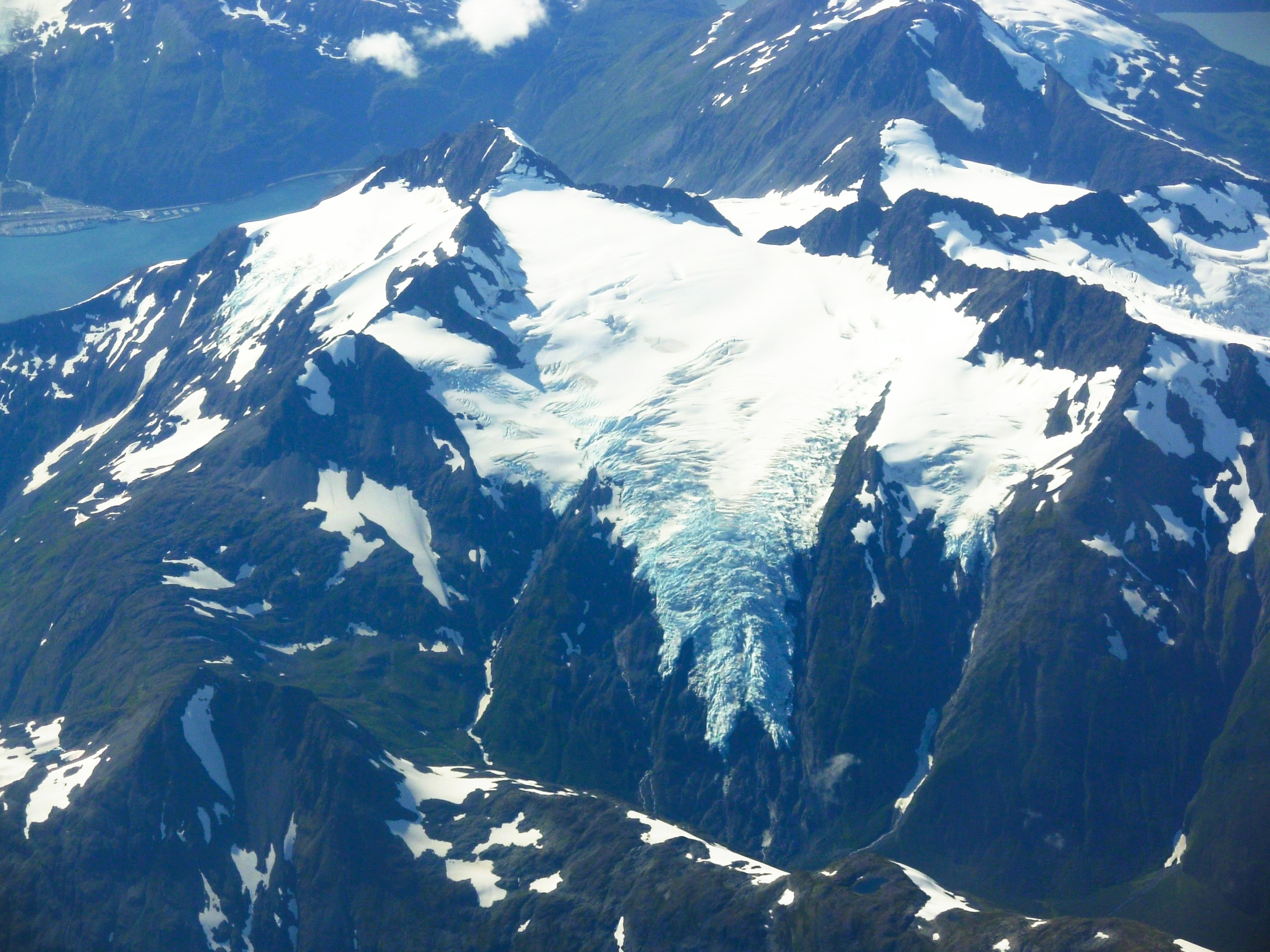
North aspect of Lowell Peak with Lowell Glacier

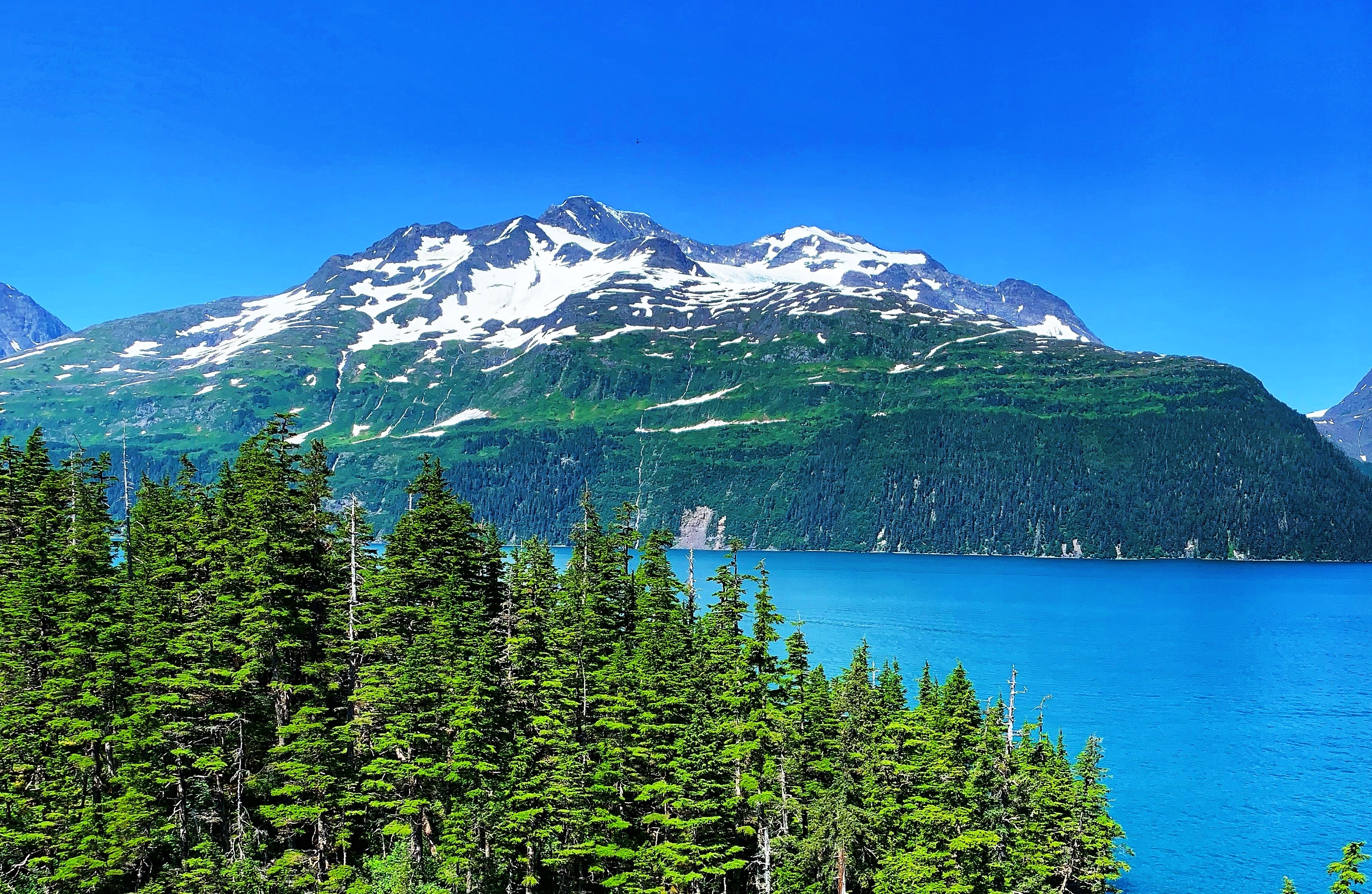
Southeast aspect of Lowell Peak across Passage Canal

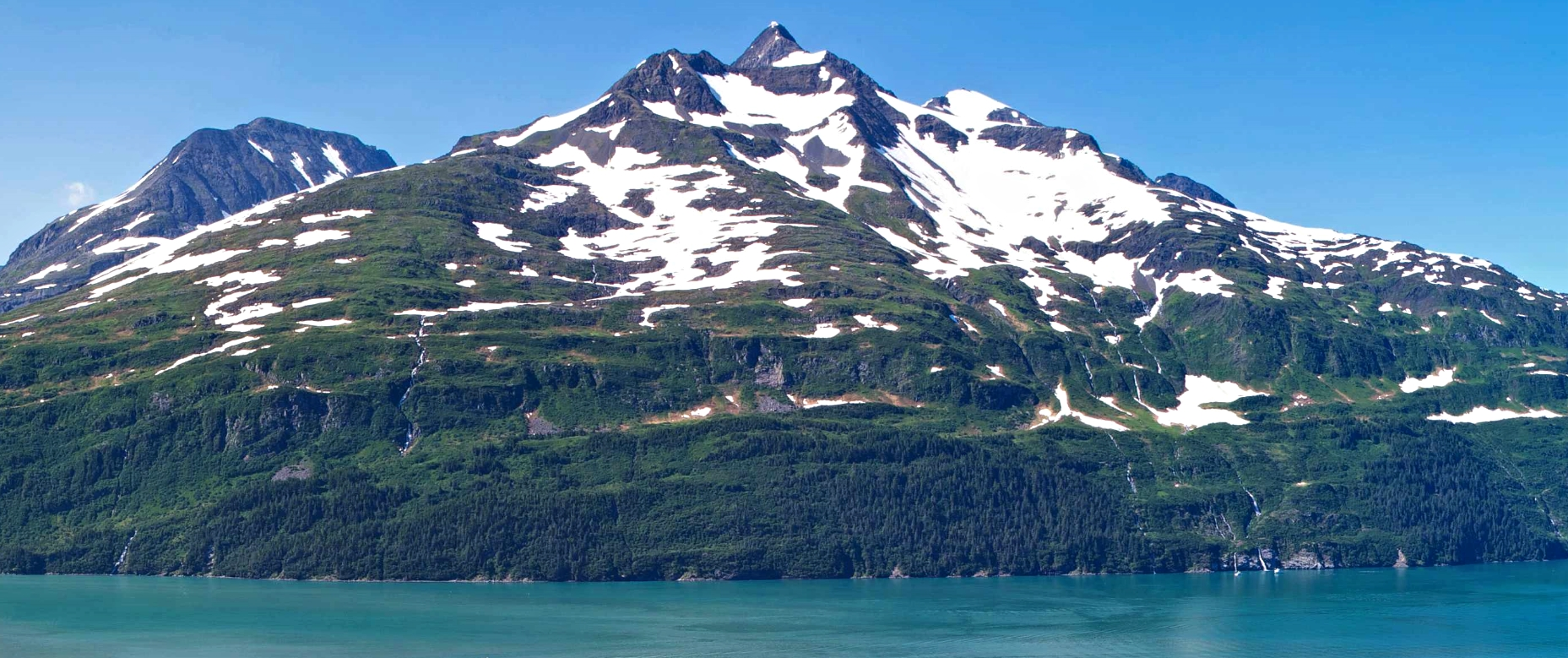
South aspect of Lowell Peak above Passage Canal

== See also ==
- List of mountain peaks of Alaska
- Geography of Alaska
