= Nancy Lake State Recreation Area =

State Recreation Area near Willow, Matanuska-Susitna Borough, Alaska

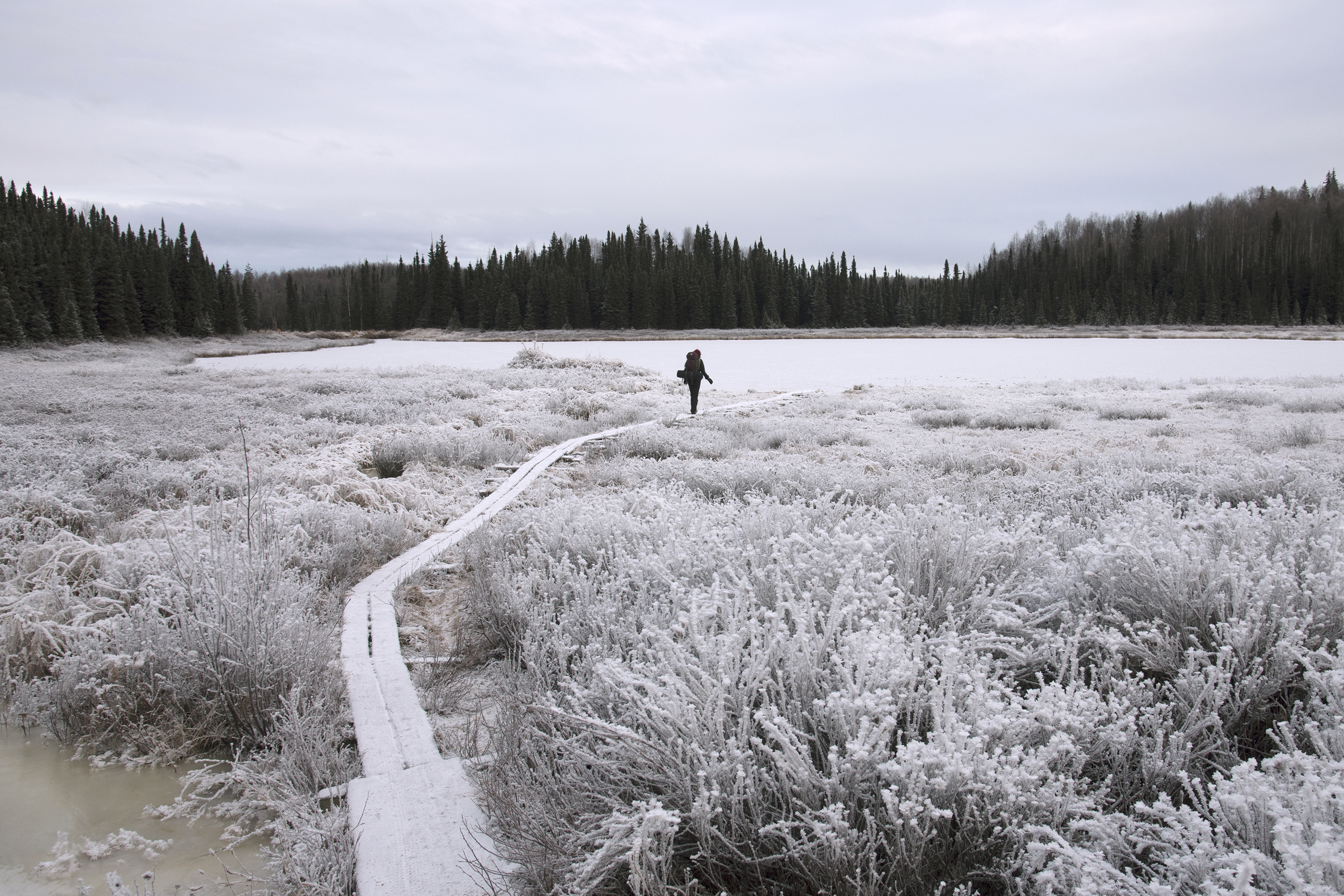
- One of the park's many lakes in winter

- Location within Alaska
- Location: Alaska, US
- Coordinates: 61°39′57″N 150°08′06″W
- Area: 22,685 acres (91.80 km^{2})
- Established: July 6, 1966
- Visitors: 40,000
- Governing body: Alaska Department of Natural Resources; Division of Parks and Outdoor Recreation

Nancy Lake State Recreation Area is a 22,685 acres (9,180 ha) park near Willow in the Matanuska-Susitna Borough of Alaska. Founded on July 6, 1966, and set aside specifically for recreational use, the park is home to more than a hundred lakes as well as extensive wetlands. The landscape of the park was crafted in glacial retreats around 9,000 years ago, and around this same time the first inhabitants likely moved into the area. They were eventually followed by Russian exploration, and later increases in white settlement due to commerce and the presence of gold.

The Nancy Lake State Recreation Site is an adjacent and smaller 36 acres (15 ha) site established in 1967. Throughout both, water related activities are a popular draw for visitors, with the larger and smaller parks hosting as many as 40,000 and 12,000 guests annually.

Flora and fauna in the area includes a variety of tree and wildflower species, large mammals such as moose and bears, and a variety of fish species, some of which are actively stocked in the waterways by the Alaska Department of Fish and Game.

== History ==
The Nancy Lake State Recreation Area was established by the Alaska State Legislature on July 6, 1966, to be set aside specifically for use as recreation. The day prior, the nearby Matanuska-Susitna Borough designated the area as a special land-use district in order to apply local zoning laws which would reinforce the recreational use of the land, and allow the borough to apply penalties for violation of the ordinance.

The park lies within the Susitna Valley, a large, flat-bottomed valley originally carved out by glaciers, leaving many small lakes behind when they withdrew about 9,000 years ago. Evidence suggests that the Tanaina people, and possibly other groups, used the area for hunting and fishing. The oldest Paleo-Arctic tradition sites in the area date to between 10,500 and 5,200 year ago. The first outside exploration of the area came in the 1790s when members of the Russian-American Company explored the area of the Cook Inlet and the Susitna River. Later, trade and then the prospect of gold attracted increased white settlement.

The Alaska Railroad and later the George Parks Highway pass near the area that is now the park, but due to the wet environment and lack of mineral resources the area was never heavily developed, making it ideal for a lake-based park. The recreation area is named for Nancy Lake, which itself is named after Nancy Lane, daughter of Franklin Lane, Secretary of the Interior 1913–1920.

== Facilities ==
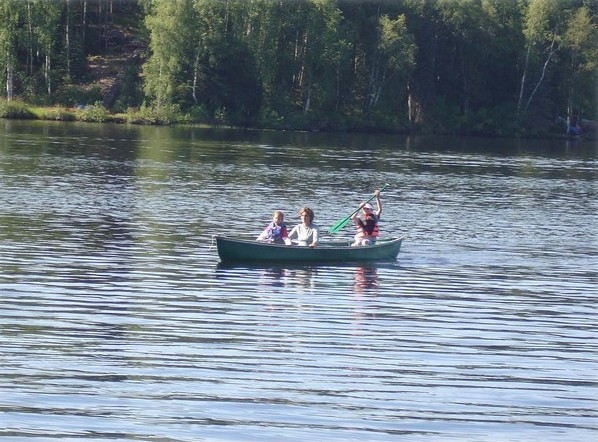
Canoeing on Nancy Lake during the summer of 2008

The park is accessed by the Nancy Lake Parkway, a 6.5 miles (10.5 km) road providing access to various features within the park, ending at 91-site campground located at South Rolly Lake. There are hiking trails but most summer visitors come for the canoe trails that allow exploration of the backcountry lakes. The canoe trails range from one- to two-day paddles, and most routes involve portages between lakes. A few of the lakes allow gasoline-powered motors or electric trolling motors, while the remainder allow only human-powered boats. There is a local vendor that rents canoes to visitors.

There are 13 public-use cabins, none of them accessible by road. Renters must hike or paddle in, or use snowmachines when the lakes are frozen.

In winter months the park is popular with a variety of users, and about 40 miles (64 km) of trails are maintained for cross-country skiing, dog mushing and snowmachines. Ice fishing is popular on many of the lakes. Visitors are advised to use caution as conditions on the lakes can change rapidly and temperatures can get as low as −40 °F (−40 °C).

The park receives an estimated 40,000 visitors annually.

=== State Recreation Site ===
The Nancy Lake State Recreation Site is a small 36 acres (15 ha) separate parcel on the north shore of Nancy Lake, with separate access down a short road from the Parks Highway. It has a 30-site campground, numerous picnic sites, and a boat launch. It was established in 1967 in cooperation between the Alaska Divisions of Mining, Land & Water, and Parks and Outdoor Recreation. The Recreation Site specifically received an estimated 12,000 visitors in 2008. (Note: The 2008 data was the 10-year high, while the recorded 10-year low was 5,000 visitors in 2004.)

== Physical geography ==
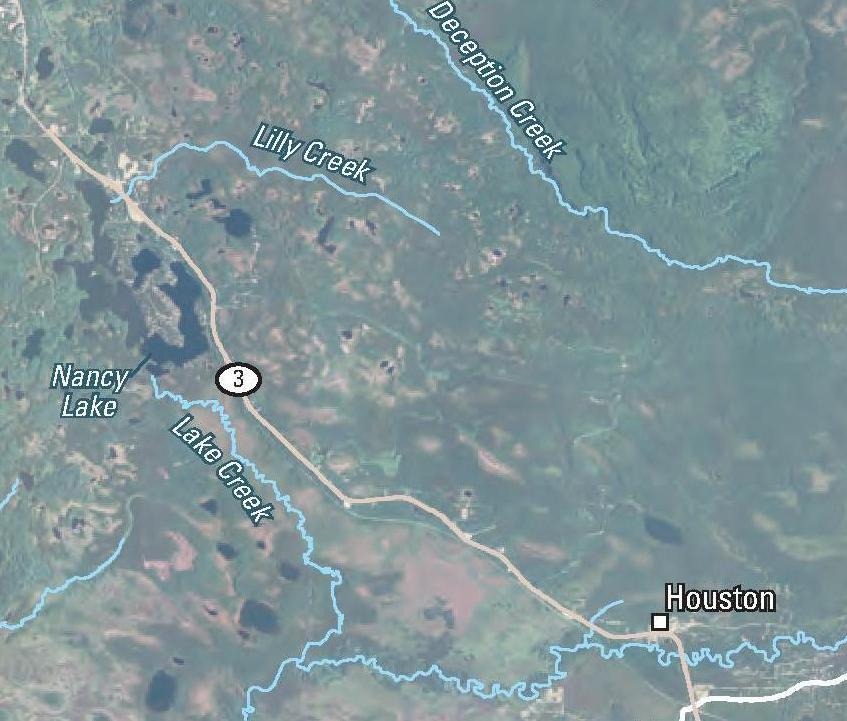
Excerpt from a USGS map showing Nancy Lake and adjoining streams in the upper left, and the nearby town of Houston, Alaska, in the bottom right

Nancy Lake State Recreation Area includes 22,685 acres (9,180 ha) of land near the towns of Willow toward the north, and Houston toward the south. There are 41 private inholdings which account for a total of 323 acres (131 ha), around 500 privately owned parcels of land adjacent to the park, and another 400 or more within 0.5 miles (0.80 km).

The glaciers that once dominated the area, and which retreated in a north-north-easterly direction 9000 years ago, left behind a landscape characterized by low hills, ridges, and lakes oriented in a similar direction to the glacial retreat. The highest point in the park lies 0.5 miles (0.80 km) west of Red Shirt Lake, standing at 375 feet (114 m) above sea level, while the lowest is Red Shirt Lake itself, at 123 feet (37 m).

The soil in the park is shallow, at around 12 inches (300 mm) in depth, and may be particularly susceptible to erosion. Of the total area of the park, 1,219 acres (493 ha) is of a slope of 10:1 or greater, and only 1,200 acres (490 ha) consists of open dry land.

At the far northern latitude of the park, summer months experience up to 18 hours of continuous daylight, while winter months may see only five. The area receives an average of 60 inches (1,500 mm) of snow per winter. Average temperatures range between 11 °F (−12 °C) and 57 °F (14 °C), with extreme temperatures ranging from −36 °F (−38 °C) to 92 °F (33 °C).

Oil, gas and coal resources exists throughout the park. A number of permits for accessing these were issued in the 1970s, but all had expired as of 1983. As of 2013, the state of Alaska owned the rights to all subsurface minerals with the exception of 15 acres (6.1 ha) near Skeetna Lake, which was owned by the Alaska Mental Health Trust Authority, but could not be legally leased for commercial development. Geothermal waters may underlie portions of the area. Ground water is also present. A number of wells have been drilled in order to supply drinking water, and these may produce as much as 10 US gallons (38 L; 8.3 imp gal) per minute.

=== Water features ===
There are 131 lakes of various sizes within or accessible from the park, many of which are part of one of the canoe trails in the area. Of these, 20 are greater than 40 acres (16 ha) in area, and overall 40% of the area of the park is either water or wetlands. The Little Susitna River also flows through the southeast corner of the park. Motorized watercraft are banned from all lakes, other than Nancy, Lynx, Butterfly, and Red Shirt. Some of the larger lakes in the park include:

- Nancy Lake is a 308 hectares (760 acres) lake, with a maximum depth of 19.8 m (65.0 ft.) and a meandering shoreline about 23.5 km (14.6 mi.) long. As much of it is outside the park boundary, large portions of the shoreline are private property, but it does have public access from both inside the park and the smaller State Recreation Site at the northeast end of the lake.
- Lynx Lake is a 127.5 ha (315.0 acres) lake in the southern area of the park. Its maximum depth is 15.2 m (50.0 ft.) Several of the parks public use cabins are located on this lake and two of the canoe trails pass through its waters.
- Red Shirt Lake is the largest lake in the park at 478.7 ha (1,183.0 acres) of surface area. It is up to 15.2 m (50.0 ft.) deep and has a 21.1 km (13.1 mi.) shoreline. As it is on the southwest boundary of the park, many areas on the shore are private property, but it is accessible from within the park by hiking and canoe trails, and has a small campground as well as cabins.

Nancy Lake State Recreation Area includes as many as 205 distinct swamps, totaling 4,335 acres (1,754 ha) in area, with the largest covering an area of 1,642 acres (664 ha), and extending 2.5 miles (4.0 km) into the eastern edge of the park.

== Ecology ==
Fish populations stocked by the Alaska Department of Fish and Game
Body of water	Year stocked (Note: As of 2013)	Species
Big Noluck	1999	rainbow trout
Delyndia Lake	1990	coho salmon
Little Noluck	1992	rainbow trout
Milo Lake	1972	rainbow trout
Nancy Lake	1994	sockeye salmon, coho salmon
North Rolly Lake	2012	rainbow trout
Rhein Lake	2012	rainbow trout
South Rolly Lake	2012	rainbow trout
Tanaina Lake	2012	rainbow trout
Little Susitna River	1995	Arctic grayling, coho salmon

The low, forested landscape with numerous lakes and relatively mild winters compared to other areas of interior Alaska creates an environment suitable for various types of flora and fauna. This includes dense forests of white birch and paper birch, areas with stands of black spruce or the larger white spruce, burned-over areas in various stages of recovery, and some areas of muskeg and bogs. Lakesides often feature numerous wildflowers in season, and water lilies on the actual lake.

Tree life in areas of the park have been damaged by spruce beetle and other pests, and other areas may be over-mature, creating an increased risk of fire, and increased need for active management efforts.

Wildlife one can expect to see include many animals that prefer wet environments, such as beavers, and numerous waterfowl, in particular the common loon. Wetland areas contain summer nesting sites for Arctic terns. Moose often feed on aquatic plants in the wetlands or lakes and also browse in brushy areas. Bears also live within the park, with black bears being common, although brown bears are seen on occasion.

As a water-oriented park, there are numerous fish species present and fishing is popular throughout the park. The larger lakes contain native populations of Dolly Varden trout, rainbow trout, lake trout and lake whitefish. Several lakes are stocked by the Alaska Department of Fish and Game. Northern pike are also present in some lakes and ponds.

== See also ==
- List of Alaska state parks
- List of lakes of Alaska
