= Fielding Lake =

Lake in the state of Alaska, United States

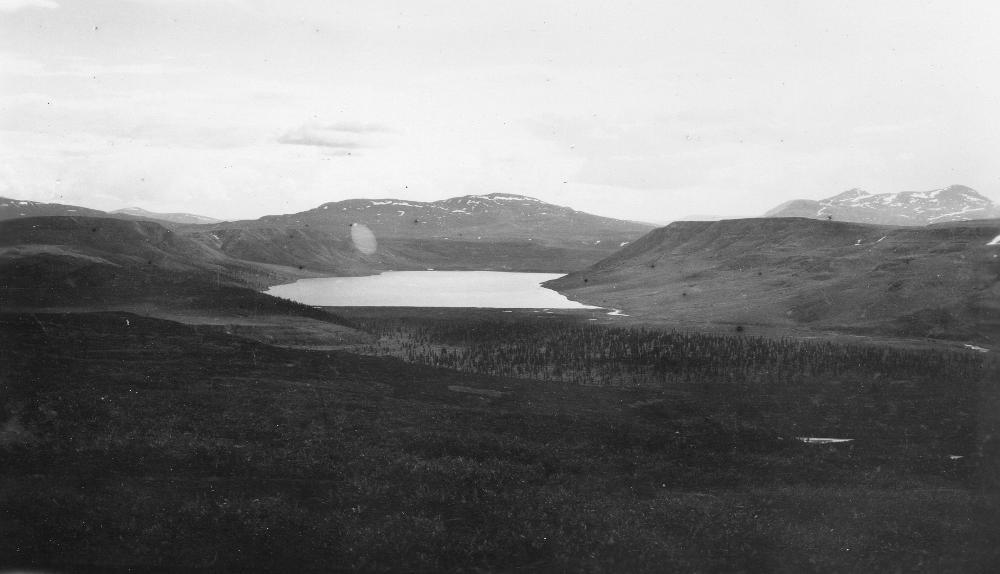
- Survey photograph c. 1910

- Location within Alaska Location within North America
- Coordinates: 63°10′22″N 145°40′48″W
- Primary inflows: 7 small, unnamed creeks
- Primary outflows: Phelan Creek, north to Delta River
- Basin countries: United States
- Managing agency: Alaska Department of Natural Resources/Alaska Department of Fish and Game
- Max. length: 4 miles (6.4 km)
- Surface area: 562 hectares (1,390 acres)
- Max. depth: 75.9 feet (23.1 m)
- Water volume: 1,731,931,563 cubic feet (49,042,840.4 m^{3})
- Shore length^{1}: 12.6 miles (20.3 km)
- Surface elevation: 2,972 feet (906 m)
- Frozen: early autumn through early summer
- ^{1} Shore length is not a well-defined measure.

Fielding Lake is an Alaskan lake adjacent to the Richardson Highway, two miles (3.2 km) north of Isabel Pass in the Alaska Range. As an alpine lake, it freezes early in autumn, and ice can remain on portions of the lake as late as July. The lake has good fishing for grayling, burbot and trout, all of which are native populations and not stocked. The lake bottom is mud and gravel, with heavy vegetation in shallow areas. The area around the lake is described as "barren, rolling tundra". The entirety of the lake itself is public, but some areas of the shore are private property.

== Park ==
On the north shore of the lake is the Fielding Lake State Recreation Site, a 605-acre (245 ha), largely undeveloped park with a campground, rental cabin, and boat launch. The park and the lake itself are above the tree line and are considered to be under "passive management".
