= Canoe Passage State Marine Park =

State marine park in Alaska, United States

- Location within Alaska
- Location: Hawkins Island
- Nearest city: Cordova
- Coordinates: 60°30′56″N 146°8′45″W
- Area: 2,507 acres (1,015 ha)
- Established: June 14, 1990
- Governing body: Alaska Division of Parks and Outdoor Recreation
- Website: Canoe Passage State Marine Reserve

Canoe Passage State Marine Park is an undeveloped 2,507 acre (1,015 ha) Alaska State Park on Hawkins Island. The state park is 8 miles west of Cordova. There is no road access to the island. Popular activities include boating, fishing, hunting, camping, and kayaking. The park is surrounded by forested uplands and wetlands.

The park is home to several crucial habitat areas including otter haul-outs, seal haul-outs, and migratory bird paths. Harbor seal and Steller sea lion sites can be found on the rocks off the entrance on the north side of Hawkins Island.

== See also ==
- List of Alaska state parks
