= Alaska State Pension Investment Board =

The Alaska State Pension Investment Board (ASPIB) is the state pension scheme of the state of Alaska, United States, based in Juneau, Alaska. It is a scheme of the Alaska Department of Revenue.
