= Alaska Department of Education & Early Development =

State government organization in US

The Alaska Department of Education & Early Development (EED) is an agency of the state government responsible for primary and secondary education in Alaska. It is headquartered in Juneau.
