= Alaska Department of Labor and Workforce Development =

Government agency in Alaska, United States

Agency overview
- Jurisdiction: Alaska
- Headquarters: Juneau, Alaska, U.S.
- Agency executive: Catherine Muñoz, Acting Commissioner
- Website: https://labor.alaska.gov/

The Alaska Department of Labor and Workforce Development (DOLWD) is a department within the government of Alaska which handles most of the state's labor and workforce issues, primarily at the administrative level.

== Structure ==
Within the Department of Labor and Workforce Development are the Alaska Workforce Investment Board, the Alaska Vocational Technical Center, the Division of Employment and Training Services, the Labor Relations Agency, the Division of Labor Standards and Safety, the Division of Vocational Rehabilitation, and the Division of Workers' Compensation. The Alaska Workers' Compensation Appeals Commission, although organizationally distinct from the Division of Workers' Compensation, is under the umbrella of the Department of Labor and Workforce Development, and hears appeals from decisions of the Alaska Workers' Compensation Board.
