= Alaska Department of Administration =

Government agency in Alaska, United States

Agency overview
- Jurisdiction: Government of Alaska
- Headquarters: Juneau, Alaska, U.S.
- Agency executive: Paula Vrana, Commissioner
- Website: https://doa.alaska.gov/

Alaska Department of Administration is a state-level agency that is responsible for providing administrative services to Alaska's government agencies.

== Background ==
The Alaska Department of Administration provides several administrative services for other state-level government agencies, including finance, personnel, labor relations, leasing, mail distribution, property management, risk management, procurement, retirement and benefits programs, information and telecommunication systems, records management, and building management. The department is managed by a commissioner appointed by the governor of Alaska.
