= Birch Lake (Laona, Wisconsin) =

Lake in Wisconsin

Coordinates: 45°34′10″N 88°38′17″W

Birch Lake is a lake in the town of Laona in Forest County, Wisconsin. The lake has no public boat launch and is surrounded by pine trees.

== Description ==
Birch Lake has a maximum depth of 70 ft (21 m) deep and is 468 acres (189 ha). The lake is surrounded by pine trees and it has no public boat launch. The United States Forest Service surveyed the lake in 1938 and they measured 4.5 mi (7.2 km) of shoreline.

The fish in the lake include Crappie and perch; predator fish in the lake include smallmouth bass and walleye. The lake also has many crayfish.

== History ==
In 1926 the lake was stocked with Whitefish and Trout fish from Sturgeon Bay Wisconsin. In 1951 the Wisconsin State Journal stated that the lake was surrounded by Norway pine trees.
