= Birch Lake (Cass County, Minnesota) =

Lake in the state of Minnesota, United States

- Location within Minnesota
- Location: Cass County, Minnesota
- Coordinates: 47°3′0″N 93°52′20″W
- Type: Lake
- Surface elevation: 1,312 feet (400 m)

Birch Lake is a lake in Cass County, Minnesota, in the United States.

Birch Lake is an English translation of the native Ojibwe-language name.

== See also ==
- List of lakes in Minnesota
