= Ash pit =

Remnant of a wildfire

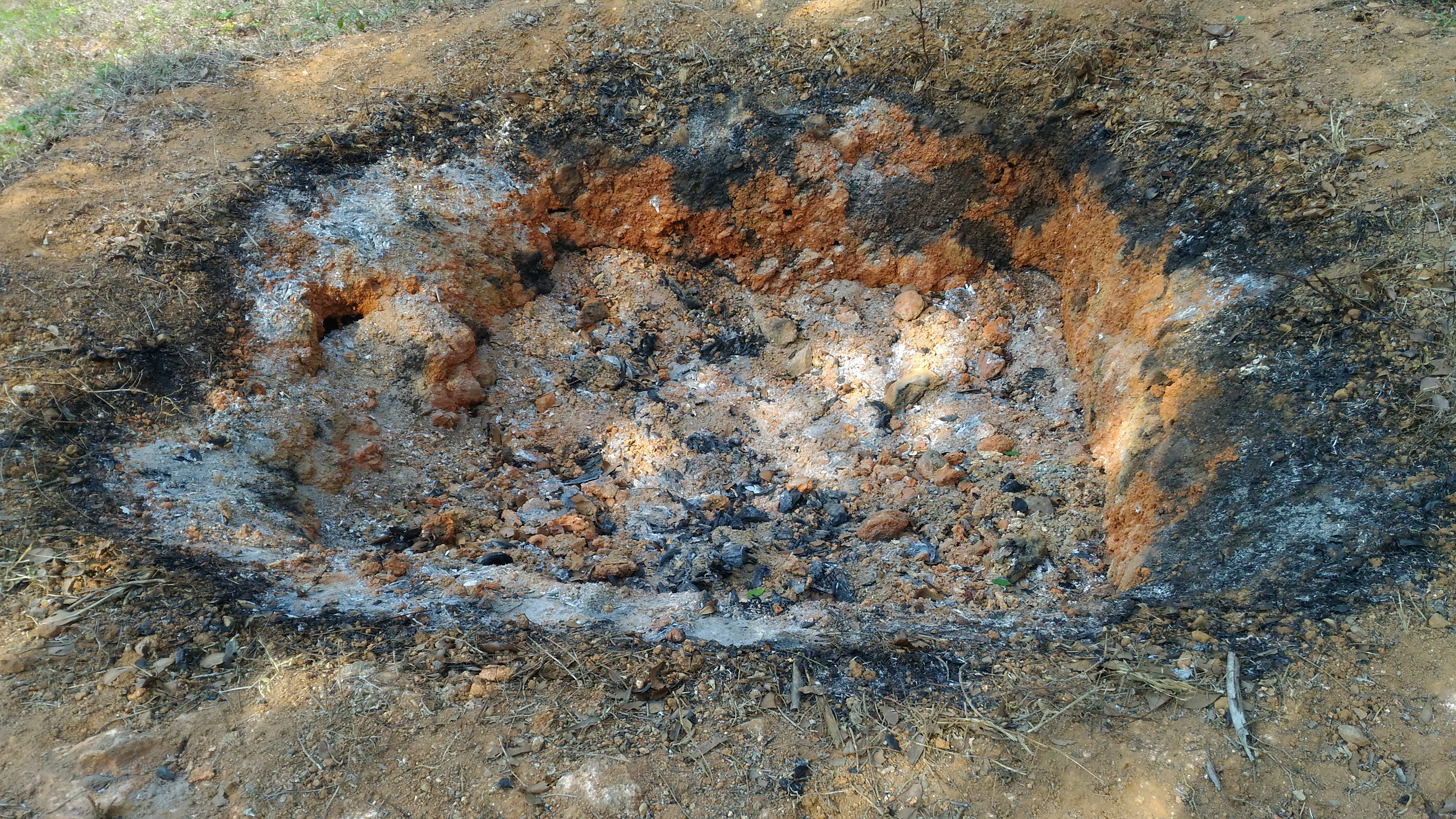
Ash pit

An ash pit is a remnant of a wildfire. It is a hole in the ground filled with ash, possibly containing hot embers beneath. It is one of the many hazards faced by those fighting wildfires. It is also a danger to residents and their pets returning after a wildfire has gone out.

An ash pit may be imperceptible from the ground above, and can remain hot for days. Those accidentally walking into one may be severely burned or killed.

After a wildfire has gone out, firefighters may detect ash pits from helicopters using infrared sensors. They can then dig down into them, and extinguish them to prevent flare ups.

== Causes ==
After a fire burns underground fuels, it can create a void that becomes filled with ash from the burned fuel. There are several environmental factors that increase the likelihood of an ash pit being formed. It may result from the presence of extensive root systems of trees and shrubs, as well as peat and deep duff covering mineral soil. Holes created by animals, such as coyote and badger dens, can become ash pits. Abandoned rodent holes can become filled with dry, organic debris. Once this debris is burned, an ash pit may be produced. Areas that have been modified by humans may also become hazardous ash pits. Examples include areas modified with heavy equipment, former bulldozer piles, as well as sawmill sites and timber yards.

== Detection ==
An ash pit may sometimes be detected by the presence of white ash or swarms of insects hovering about.

Nearly translucent smoke that quickly dissipates may be visible emanating from an ash pit when it is between the observer and the sun.

Due to incomplete burning, an ash pit may also produce a smell of burning creosote or incomplete combustion.

== Mitigation ==
Upon detection, marking or flagging ash pits is advised. Landscapes that have the potential to produce ash pits should be avoided.
