= Birch Lake (Aitkin County, Minnesota) =

Lake in the state of Minnesota, United States

- Location within Minnesota
- Location: Aitkin County, Minnesota and Crow Wing County, Minnesota
- Coordinates: 46°22′9″N 93°48′32″W
- Type: Lake
- Surface elevation: 1,276 feet (389 m)

Birch Lake is a lake in Aitkin and Crow Wing counties, Minnesota, United States.

Birch Lake was named after two types of birch found there (Betula papyrifera and Betula alleghaniensis) from which Native Americans fashioned canoes.

== See also ==
- List of lakes in Minnesota
