= Security Bay State Marine Park =

Protected area in Alaska, United States

Coordinates: 56°51′18″N 134°22′01″W

- Location within Alaska
- Location: Kuiu Island
- Nearest city: Kake
- Coordinates: 56°51'18"N 134°22'1"W
- Area: 1,960 acres (790 ha)
- Established: July 1, 1986
- Governing body: Alaska Division of Parks and Outdoor Recreation
- Website: Security Bay State Marine Park

Security Bay State Marine Park is a 1,960 acre (790 ha) undeveloped Alaska state marine park on the north end of Kuiu Island, facing Frederick Sound and Chatham Strait. The bay provides a safe haven anchorage for vessels in the area. The nearest city is Kake, about 20 miles to the east. There is no road access to the park.

Popular activities include camping, fishing, kayaking, boating, and wildlife viewing.

The park is a waterfowl and shorebird concentration area, waterfowl community harvest area, and Dungeness crab commercial harvest area. The park is also used by black bear, deer, and waterfowl hunters.

== See also ==
- List of Alaska state parks
