= Bettles Bay State Marine Park =

State marine park in Alaska, United States

Coordinates: 60°57′30″N 148°19′27″W

- Location within Alaska
- Nearest city: Whittier
- Coordinates: 60°57'30"N 148°19'27"W
- Area: 679 acres (275 ha)
- Established: July 16, 1983
- Governing body: Alaska Division of Parks and Outdoor Recreation
- Website: Bettles Bay State Marine Park

Bettles Bay State Marine Park is a 679-acre (275 ha) undeveloped Alaska state marine park. There is no road access to the park. The park can be accessed from the lagoon northeast of the islands. The park offers great views of Bettles Glacier. Attractions include an old stamp press and gold mine, just southeast of the park.

Activities include wildlife viewing, boating, and fishing. Although there are campsites, camping is poor due to wetlands.

There are many habitats within the park including estuaries, eelgrass beds, salmon spawning, waterfowl nesting, and sea otter habitats.

== See also ==
- List of Alaska state parks
