= Boswell Bay Beaches State Marine Park =

State park in Alaska, United States

Boswell Bay State Marine Park
- Location within Alaska
- Location: Hinchinbrook Island
- Nearest city: Cordova
- Coordinates: 60°22′48″N 146°7′15″W
- Area: 3,047 acres (1,233 ha)
- Established: June 14, 1990
- Governing body: Alaska Division of Parks and Outdoor Recreation
- Website: Boswell Bay State Marine Park

Boswell Bay State Marine Park is a 3,047 acre undeveloped Alaska state marine park on the eastern tip of Hinchinbrook Island, approximately 15 miles southwest of Cordova. Areas of the park are adjacent to the Copper River Delta State Critical Habitat. In 1964, an earthquake uplifted a substantial part of the park, moving the shore inland by more than a mile.

Popular activities include beach combing, hunting, boating, camping, and clamming. There is no source of fresh water within the park.

The park is home to shorebird rookeries and is a primary seabird and waterfowl migratory path.

== See also ==
- List of Alaska state parks
