= Passage Canal =

Bay in Alaska, United States

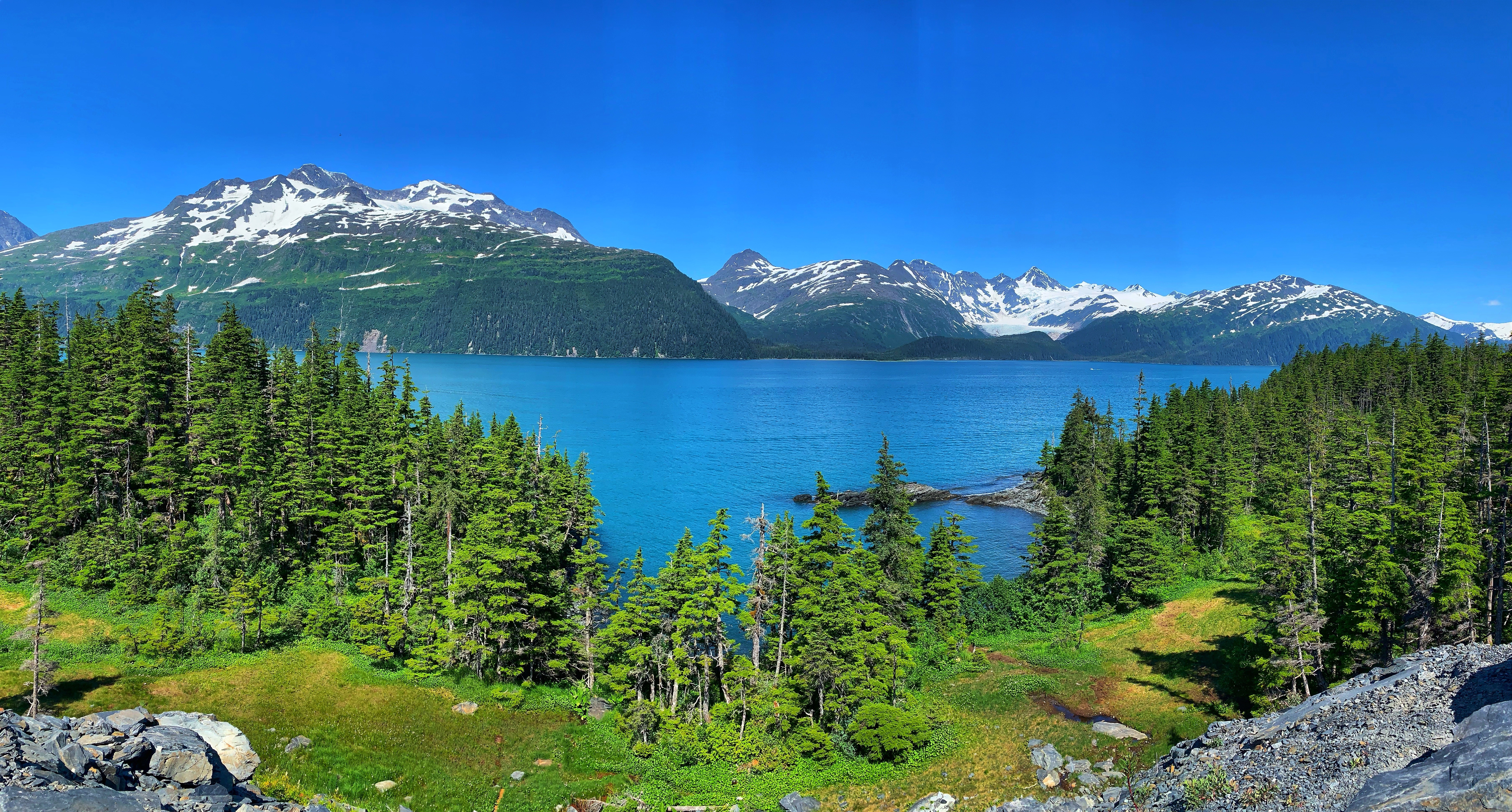
- Passage Canal, with Lowell Peak to left

- Location within Alaska
- Location: Kenai Peninsula, Alaska
- Coordinates: 60.813°N 148.546°W
- Primary inflows: Whittier Creek, Learnard Creek, Cove Creek, Billings Creek, Seth River
- Basin countries: United States
- Max. length: 11 mi (18 km)
- Max. width: 2 mi (3.2 km)
- Average depth: 1,128 ft (344 m)
- Max. depth: 1,290 ft (390 m)
- Frozen: Never
- Islands: None
- Sections/sub-basins: Shotgun Cove, Emerald Bay, Squirrel Cove, Poe Bay, Logging Camp Bay
- Settlements: Whittier

Passage Canal is a natural bay (not an artificial canal) of Prince William Sound on the east coast of the Kenai Peninsula of Alaska, United States. Its only settlement is the small town of Whittier, located near the head of the bay.

It is called the gateway to Prince William Sound as many water taxis, kayak tours, anglers, and recreational boaters use the bay to access nearby state marine parks and federal cabins.

The town of Whittier was founded along the banks of Passage Canal to serve as a secret deep water port for the United States military during World War II.

== Fatalities and incidents ==
On April 1, 2018, Anchorage resident Karl Stoltz went missing after departing Whittier's deep water port in a small skiff to harvest crabs over Easter. Earlier, he had been spotted experiencing issues with the engine of the watercraft, which had recently been bought on Craigslist. His hypothermic body was found floating two days later, attached to lines hooked to crab pots after an intensive Coast Guard search.
