= Birch Lake (Alaska) =

Lake in Fairbanks North Star Borough, Alaska, United States

- Location within Alaska Location within North America
- Location: Fairbanks North Star Borough, Alaska
- Coordinates: 64°18′59″N 146°39′45″W
- Surface area: 340.3 hectares (841 acres)
- Max. depth: 14.8 meters (49 ft)
- Surface elevation: 218 meters (715 ft)

Birch Lake is a lake in Fairbanks North Star Borough, Alaska. The lake contains Arctic char, Arctic grayling, Chinook salmon, coho salmon, and rainbow trout and has been stocked extensively since 1966. It is a popular spot for both fishing from boats and ice fishing in the winter.

== Recreation site ==
Birch Lake State Recreation Site is a 48-acre (19 ha) state park on the shores of Birch Lake. It is located on the Richardson Highway about 60 miles (97 km) southeast of Fairbanks. It features a small campground, boat launch, and swimming and picnic areas. Immediately adjacent to it is a military recreation site operated by the Air Force.
