= Alaska Department of Natural Resources =

Government agency in Alaska, United States

Agency overview
- Formed: April 16, 1959
- Jurisdiction: Government of Alaska
- Headquarters: 550 West 7th. Avenue, Suite 1400, Anchorage, Alaska 99501-3557
- Agency executive: John Boyle, Commissioner
- Parent agency: State of Alaska
- Child agencies: Division of Agriculture; Division of Forestry & Fire Protection; Division of Geological & Geophysical Surveys; Division of Mining, Land & Water; Division of Oil & Gas; Division of Parks & Recreation; Division of Support Services
- Website: dnr.alaska.gov

The Alaska Department of Natural Resources is a department within the government of Alaska in the United States. The department has the mission of responsibly developing Alaska's resources by making them available for maximum use and benefit consistent with the public interest.

The department comprises seven divisions:

- Division of Agriculture
- Division of Forestry
- Division of Geological & Geophysical Surveys (DGGS)
- Division of Mining, Land and Water
- Division of Oil and Gas (including the Petroleum Systems Integrity Office)
- Division of Parks and Outdoor Recreation
- Support Services Division

== Official mission ==
The official mission of the Alaska Department of Natural Resources is "to develop, conserve and maximize the use of Alaska's natural resources consistent with the public interest". The Department of Natural Resources articulates its activities on its official website stating:

"The Department of Natural Resources manages all state-owned land, water and natural resources, except for fish and game, on behalf of the people of Alaska. When all land conveyances from the federal government are completed, the people of the state will own land and resources on 104 million acres: Approximately 100 million acres have been conveyed so far. The state owns approximately 60 million acres of tidelands, shorelands, and submerged lands and manages 40,000 miles of coastline. The state also owns the freshwater resources of the state, a resource that equals about 40% of the entire nation's fresh water flow."

As stated above, aside from fish and game, for matters to do with resources such as timber, oil, natural gas or water, the Department of Natural Resources is the governing authority. The department fields requests and inquiries from both private organizations and corporations as well as from the federal government on the availability and accessibility of natural resources in the state of Alaska and must keep the citizens of Alaska in mind while making any decisions regarding said natural resources. The task is difficult uniquely in Alaska because occupations related to natural resources dominate the Alaskan economy and its job market. This makes the balance between doing what is prudent from a fiscal perspective versus doing what is best for the environment an ever-swinging pendulum.

== Current situation ==
Most recently, government and public and political interests in oil and natural gas have become a controversial docket item for the Alaska Department of Natural Resources, in part because of the lucrative nature of the resources but also due to the large quantities of oil located on land managed by the department. Pressure from the US Government to produce and extract more US oil and natural gas, thus reducing dependence on foreign resources, has created friction amongst the citizens of Alaska and the Alaska Department of Natural Resources. For example, the federal Trump administration of 2017-2020 took several steps to open portions of the Arctic National Wildlife Refuge in Alaska up for oil and gas exploration. The refuge comprises 19.3 million acres and the desired parcel of land is approximately 1.6 million acres – home to wildlife such as polar bears, wolves, migratory birds, and the porcupine caribou herd. For many years this area has been closed off to oil and natural gas exploration because of some of the effects that intervening in an area such as the Arctic National Wildlife Refuge could have on the land, the ecosystem and the wildlife in the area. Grappling with the potential economic advantages and lucrative nature of oil and natural-gas production and doing the right thing for the environment is commonplace for The Alaska Department of Natural Resources. This balance is especially difficult considering a 2017 report noting that there are an estimated 640 million barrels of untapped oil and 219 trillion cubic feet of potential natural-gas between the North Slope and Cook Inlet, both of which are managed by the department.

== Resources managed ==
Separate from oil and natural-gas resources, Alaska has a variety of minerals that have a large set of uses. Alaska contains a large quantity of coal, copper, lead, zinc, and silver. Mining and minerals support a substantial part of the Alaskan economy, as managed by the Department of Natural Resources. In 2016, the Division of Mining, land and water generated $28.4 million through the authorization of state lands and water.

== Environmental issues ==
Following the election of Donald Trump in the 2016 presidential contest, one of the main focuses of the administration shifted to becoming energy-independent, and the spotlight came on the amount of potential, untapped oil and natural-gas. This sparked controversy nationwide, but particularly in Alaska, because of its abundance of resources. Under the Trump administration the Tax Cuts and Jobs Act of 2017 passed, with provisions embedded that would strip protections and allow for potential prospecting and extraction of natural resources on public lands, including those in Alaska. The public outcry for protection of the lands in jeopardy of corporatization became increasingly loud. In September 2019, the federal House of Representatives passed the Arctic Cultural and Coastal Plain Protection Act, aiming to protect over 1.5 million acres of land. Sections of the Arctic National Wildlife Refuge provide a unique habitat home to many different species that thrive in its current condition. The Arctic National Refuge contains more biodiversity than anywhere north of the Arctic Circle. Proponents of the bill believe that any human intervention could potentially damage the area for decades, rendering parts of the land uninhabitable to many species native to the area. The passage of the bill means a restoration of protective provisions stripped by the tax bill in 2017. Bills like this specify where the Alaska Department of Natural Resources can issue leases and permissions to corporations to search for and excavate natural resources.
