= Jim Sykes =

American politician (born 1950)

Member of the Matanuska-Susitna Borough Assembly from District 1
- In office October 2013 – November 2019
- Preceded by: Warren Keogh
- Succeeded by: Tim Hale

Personal details
- Born: James L. Sykes; April 8, 1950 (age 75) Rapid City, South Dakota, U.S.
- Party: Green

James L. Sykes (born April 8, 1950) is an American producer and elected official in the state of Alaska, who helped found the Green Party of Alaska.

== Early life and career ==
Sykes was born in Rapid City, South Dakota and moved to Alaska ca. 1976. Sykes spent many years living and working in both Anchorage and Talkeetna. Sykes's professional experience includes work for the Alaska Native Review Commission, public radio stations KSKA and KTNA, and as executive director of the Alaska Public Interest Research Group. He homesteaded in the community of Chase, near Talkeetna, and help to found the Chase Community Council. He and his wife currently live near Palmer in a solar-powered straw-bale house.

== Green Party activism ==
In 1990, Sykes became one of the founders of the Green Party of Alaska. As a result, Sykes initiated a lawsuit, Sykes v. Alaska, relying heavily upon case law established in the earlier ballot access lawsuits of Joe Vogler during the 1970s and 1980s. The lawsuit allowed the Green Party onto the ballot in similar fashion to the original ballot access status of the Alaskan Independence Party prior to its becoming a recognized political party. This lawsuit also led to the lessening of the threshold needed to become recognized as a political party in Alaska. In the 1990 gubernatorial election, Sykes ran as the Green Party nominee and garnered 3.3% of the vote. This established Alaska as the first state to obtain ballot access for the Green Party in the United States.

Sykes continued to be active in Green Party politics, running for the U.S. Senate twice, in 2002 and 2004, receiving 7.24% of the vote in 2002 and 2.22% in 2004.

== Mat-Su Borough Assembly ==
In 2013, Sykes ran against Doug Glenn for an open seat in district 1 on the nonpartisan borough assembly of Matanuska-Susitna Borough. District 1 covers the eastern portion of the borough and includes Butte, Lazy Mountain, South Knik River, Farm Loop, South Fishhook, Buffalo Soapstone, Sutton, Chickaloon, Glacier View and Lake Louise. On October 1, 2013 Sykes won by 69 votes. He succeeded Warren Keogh. Sykes did not run for reelection in the 2019 election. Tim Hale defeated Brian Endle for the district 1 seat.

== Electoral history ==
Mat-Su Borough Assembly Election 2013, District 1
| Party | Candidate | Votes | % |
|---|---|---|---|
| Independent | Jim Sykes | 1,112 | 51.6 |
| Independent | Doug Glenn | 1,043 | 48.4 |
| Total votes | | 2,155 | 100 |

United States Senate election in Alaska, 2004
| Party | Candidate | Votes | % | ±% |
|---|---|---|---|---|
| Republican | Lisa Murkowski (inc.) | 149,773 | 48.58% | −25.91% |
| Democratic | Tony Knowles | 140,424 | 45.55% | +25.82% |
| Independent | Marc J. Millican | 8,885 | 2.88% | |
| Independence | Jerry Sanders | 3,785 | 1.23% | |
| Green | Jim Sykes | 3,053 | 0.99% | 2.22% |
| Libertarian | Scott A. Kohlhaas | 1,240 | 0.40% | −1.87% |
| Independent | Ted Gianoutsas | 732 | 0.24% | |
| Write-ins | | 423 | 0.14% | |
| Majority | | 9,349 | 3.03% | −51.74% |
| Turnout | | 308,315 | | |
| Republican hold | | Swing | | |

United States Senate election in Alaska, 2002
| Party | Candidate | Votes | % | ±% |
|---|---|---|---|---|
| Republican | Ted Stevens (inc.) | 179,438 | 78.17% | +1.46% |
| Democratic | Frank Vondersaar | 24,133 | 10.51% | +0.17% |
| Green | Jim Sykes | 16,608 | 7.24% | −5.29% |
| Independence | Jim Dore | 6,724 | 2.93% | |
| Libertarian | Leonard Karpinski | 2,354 | 1.03% | |
| Write-ins | | 291 | 0.13% | |
| Majority | | 155,305 | 67.66% | +3.47% |
| Turnout | | 229,548 | | |
| Republican hold | | Swing | | |

1994 gubernatorial election, Alaska
| Party | Candidate | Votes | % | ±% |
|---|---|---|---|---|
| Democratic | Tony Knowles | 87,693 | 41.08 | +10.2 |
| Republican | Jim Campbell | 87,157 | 40.84 | +14.7 |
| Independence | Jack Coghill | 27,838 | 13.04 | −25.8 |
| Green | Jim Sykes | 8,727 | 4.09 | +0.7 |
| Patriot | Ralph Winterrowd | 1,743 | 0.82 | +0.3 |
| Write-ins | | 277 | 0.13 | −0.0 |
| Majority | | 536 | 0.24 | −7.7 |
| Turnout | | 213,435 | 63.5 | −1.3 |
| Democratic gain from Republican | | Swing | -36.01 | |

1990 gubernatorial election, Alaska
| Party | Candidate | Votes | % | ±% |
|---|---|---|---|---|
| Independence | Walter Hickel | 75,721 | 38.88 | +33.3 |
| Democratic | Tony Knowles | 60,201 | 30.91 | −16.4 |
| Republican | Arliss Sturgulewski | 50,991 | 26.18 | −16.4 |
| Green | Jim Sykes | 6,563 | 3.37 | N/A |
| The Political Party | Michael O'Callaghan | 942 | 0.48 | N/A |
| Write-in votes | | 332 | 0.17 | −3.8 |
| Majority | | 15,520 | 7.97 | +3.3 |
| Turnout | | 194,750 | | |
| Independence gain from Democratic | | Swing | -49.70 | |
