= List of places in Alaska (F) =

This list of cities, towns, unincorporated communities, counties, and other recognized places in the U.S. state of Alaska also includes information on the number and names of counties in which the place lies, and its lower and upper zip code bounds, if applicable.

Name of place	Number of counties	Principal county	Lower zip code	Upper zip code
Fairbanks	1	Fairbanks North Star Borough	99701	
Fairbanks International Airport	1	Fairbanks North Star Borough	99701	
Fairbanks North Star	1	Fairbanks North Star Borough		
Fairbanks North Star Borough School District	1	Fairbanks North Star Borough		
Fairhaven	1	City and Borough of Juneau		
Fairview	1	Municipality of Anchorage		
Falls	1	Kenai Peninsula Borough		
False Pass	1	Aleutians East Borough	99508	
False Pass	1	Aleutians East Borough	99583	
Farewell	1	Yukon-Koyukuk Census Area	99629	
Farm Loop	1	Matanuska-Susitna Borough		
Federal	1	Fairbanks North Star Borough	99701	
Ferry	1	Denali Borough		
Fink Creek	1	Northwest Arctic Borough		
Fink Creek-Utica	1	Northwest Arctic Borough		
Fire Lake	1	Municipality of Anchorage	99577	
Fishhook	1	Matanuska-Susitna Borough		
Fishhook	1	Yukon-Koyukuk Census Area		
Fish Village	1	Kusilvak Census Area		
Flat	1	Yukon-Koyukuk Census Area	99584	
Folger	1	Yukon-Koyukuk Census Area		
Fort Glenn	1	Aleutians West Census Area		
Fort Greely	1	Southeast Fairbanks Census Area	98733	
Fort Richardson	1	Municipality of Anchorage	99505	
Fortuna Ledge	1	Kusilvak Census Area	99585	
Fort Wainwright	1	Fairbanks North Star Borough	99703	
Fort Yukon	1	Yukon-Koyukuk Census Area	99740	
Fort Yukon Station	1	Yukon-Koyukuk Census Area	99740	
Four Mile Road	1	Yukon-Koyukuk Census Area		
Fox	1	Fairbanks North Star Borough	99701	
Fox River	1	Kenai Peninsula Borough		
Freshwater Bay	1	Skagway-Hoonah-Angoon Census Area		
Fritz Cove	1	City and Borough of Juneau	99824	
Fritz Creek	1	Kenai Peninsula Borough	99603	
Funny River	1	Kenai Peninsula Borough		
Funter	1	Skagway-Hoonah-Angoon Census Area	99801	
