= Petersville, Alaska =

- Census-designated place
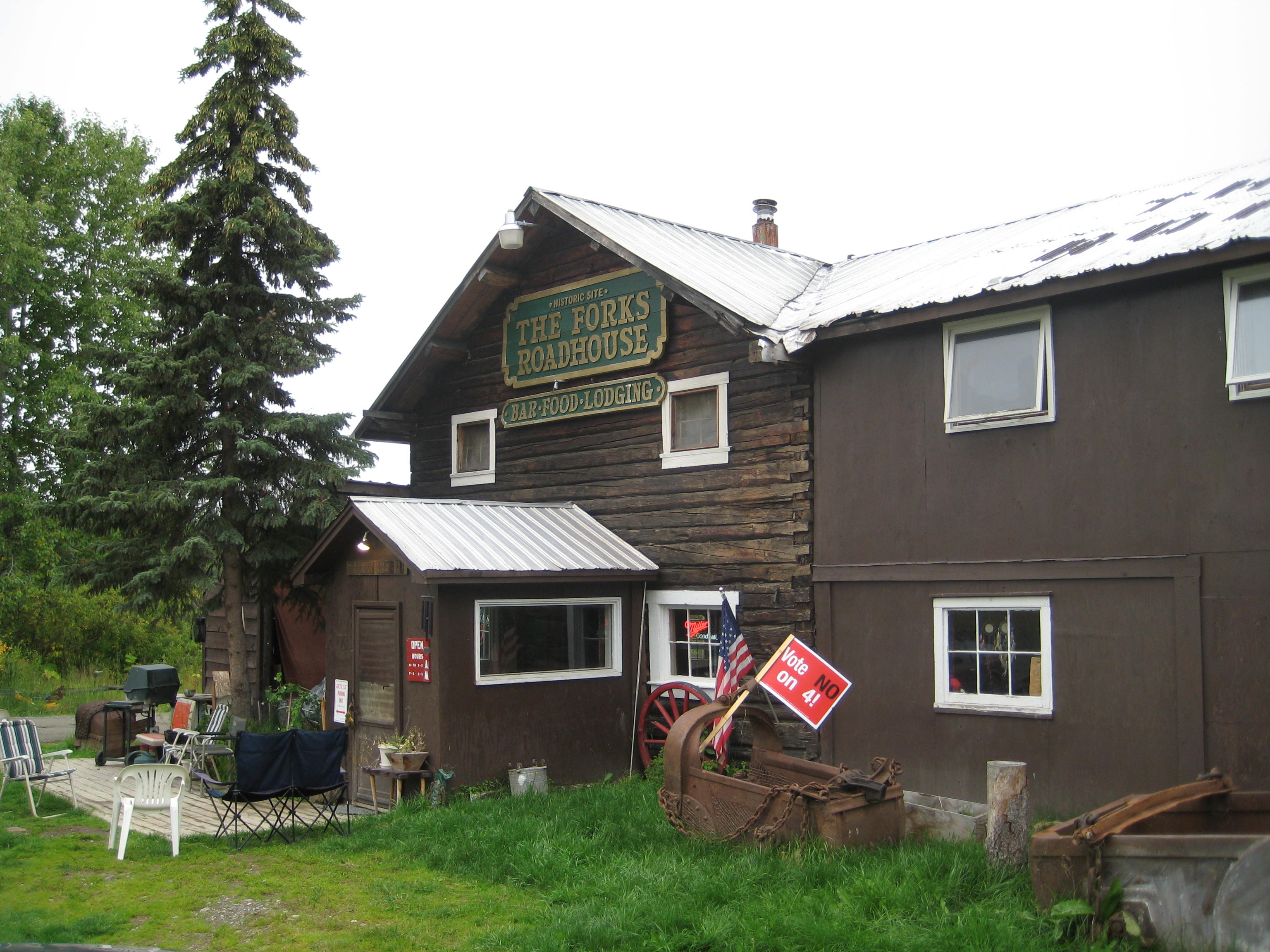
- The Forks Roadhouse is the community's central meeting point.

- Location in Matanuska-Susitna Borough and the state of Alaska

- Location within the state of Alaska
- Coordinates: 62°22′37″N 150°44′49″W
- Country: United States
- State: Alaska
- Borough: Matanuska-Susitna

Government
  - Borough mayor: Edna DeVries
  - State senator: Mike Shower (R)
  - State rep.: Kevin McCabe (R)

Area
  - Total: 462.50 sq mi (1,197.87 km^{2})
  - Land: 461.83 sq mi (1,196.14 km^{2})
  - Water: 0.66 sq mi (1.72 km^{2})
- Elevation: 1,617 ft (493 m)

Population (2020)
  - Total: 27
  - Density: 0.052/sq mi (0.02/km^{2})
- Time zone: UTC-9 (Alaska (AKST))
  - Summer (DST): UTC-8 (AKDT)
- Area code: 907
- FIPS code: 02-60460
- GNIS feature ID: 1407927

Petersville is a census-designated place (CDP) in Matanuska-Susitna Borough, Alaska, United States. It is part of the Anchorage Metropolitan Area. The population was 27 at the 2020 census.

== Geography ==
Petersville is located in the northwest part of Matanuska-Susitna Borough at 62°22′37″N 150°44′49″W (62.376890, -150.746952). It is bordered to the east by the Trapper Creek CDP. The small community of Petersville sits along Petersville Road on the east side of Peters Creek, 29 miles (47 km) northwest of Alaska Route 3 (the Parks Highway) at Trapper Creek, and 145 miles (233 km) north of Anchorage. The CDP is bordered to the north by Denali National Park.

According to the United States Census Bureau, the Petersville CDP has a total area of 462.5 square miles (1,198 km^{2}), of which 461.8 square miles (1,196 km^{2}) are land and 0.7 square miles (1.8 km^{2}), or 0.14%, are water. The CDP is bordered to the west by the Kahiltna River, fed by the Kahiltna Glacier on the south side of Denali.

=== Climate ===
Petersville is categorized as being within the 3a USDA hardiness zone, meaning temperatures can get as low as −40 to −35 °F (−40 to −37 °C).

Climate data for Petersville (1,617 feet above sea level)
| Month | Jan | Feb | Mar | Apr | May | Jun | Jul | Aug | Sep | Oct | Nov | Dec | Year |
|---|---|---|---|---|---|---|---|---|---|---|---|---|---|
| Mean daily maximum °F (°C) | 18.0 (−7.8) | 22.0 (−5.6) | 30.0 (−1.1) | 42.0 (5.6) | 54.0 (12.2) | 65.0 (18.3) | 66.0 (18.9) | 62.0 (16.7) | 52.0 (11.1) | 35.0 (1.7) | 23.0 (−5.0) | 21.0 (−6.1) | 40.8 (4.9) |
| Daily mean °F (°C) | 11.0 (−11.7) | 14.0 (−10.0) | 19.5 (−6.9) | 30.5 (−0.8) | 42.5 (5.8) | 53.0 (11.7) | 55.5 (13.1) | 52.0 (11.1) | 42.5 (5.8) | 27.5 (−2.5) | 16.0 (−8.9) | 14.0 (−10.0) | 31.5 (−0.3) |
| Mean daily minimum °F (°C) | 4.0 (−15.6) | 6.0 (−14.4) | 9.0 (−12.8) | 19.0 (−7.2) | 31.0 (−0.6) | 41.0 (5.0) | 45.0 (7.2) | 42.0 (5.6) | 33.0 (0.6) | 20.0 (−6.7) | 9.0 (−12.8) | 7.0 (−13.9) | 22.2 (−5.5) |
| Average precipitation inches (mm) | 2.23 (57) | 2.14 (54) | 1.43 (36) | 1.38 (35) | 1.03 (26) | 1.65 (42) | 3.92 (100) | 5.83 (148) | 5.82 (148) | 3.24 (82) | 2.44 (62) | 2.91 (74) | 34.02 (864) |
Source: Weather Channel

== Demographics ==
Historical population
| Census | Pop. | Note | %± |
|---|---|---|---|
| 2000 | 27 | | — |
| 2010 | 4 | | −85.2% |
| 2020 | 27 | | 575.0% |
U.S. Decennial Census

Petersville first appeared on the 2000 U.S. Census as a census-designated place (CDP).

As of the census of 2000, there were 27 people, 17 households, and 7 families residing in the CDP. The population density was 0.1 inhabitants per square mile (0.039/km^{2}). There were 189 housing units at an average density of 0.5 per square mile (0.19/km^{2}). The racial makeup of the CDP was 88.89% White, 7.41% Native American and 3.70% Pacific Islander.

There were 17 households, out of which 5.9% had children under the age of 18 living with them, 29.4% were married couples living together, and 58.8% were non-families. 58.8% of all households were made up of individuals, and 11.8% had someone living alone who was 65 years of age or older. The average household size was 1.59 and the average family size was 2.00.

In the CDP, the population was spread out, with 3.7% under the age of 18, 18.5% from 25 to 44, 63.0% from 45 to 64, and 14.8% who were 65 years of age or older. The median age was 52 years. For every 100 females, there were 200.0 males. For every 100 females age 18 and over, there were 225.0 males.

The median income for a household in the CDP was $43,750, and the median income for a family was $0. Males had a median income of $0 versus $0 for females. The per capita income for the CDP was $43,200. There were no families and none of the population living below the poverty line, including no under eighteens and none of those over 64.

== See also ==
- Yentna-Cache Creek mining district
