= Skwentna, Alaska =

- CDP
- Location in Matanuska-Susitna Borough and the state of Alaska

- Location within the state of Alaska
- Coordinates: 61°52′46″N 151°15′59″W
- Country: United States
- State: Alaska
- Borough: Matanuska-Susitna

Government
  - Borough mayor: Edna DeVries
  - State senator: Mike Shower (R)
  - State rep.: Kevin McCabe (R)

Area
  - Total: 445.86 sq mi (1,154.77 km^{2})
  - Land: 438.61 sq mi (1,136.00 km^{2})
  - Water: 7.25 sq mi (18.77 km^{2})
- Elevation: 144 ft (44 m)

Population (2020)
  - Total: 62
  - Density: 0.13/sq mi (0.05/km^{2})
- Time zone: UTC-9 (Alaska (AKST))
  - Summer (DST): UTC-8 (AKDT)
- ZIP code: 99667
- Area code: 907
- FIPS code: 02-70870
- GNIS feature ID: 1866975

Skwentna is a census-designated place (CDP) on Iditarod Trail in Matanuska-Susitna Borough, Alaska, United States. Located 61 miles northwest of Wasilla along the Skwentna River, it is part of the Anchorage, Alaska Metropolitan Statistical Area. At the 2020 census the population was 62, up from 37 in 2010. The town is served by Skwentna Airport.

== Geography and climate ==
Skwentna is located at 61°52′46″N 151°15′59″W (61.879482, −151.266455).

According to the United States Census Bureau, the CDP has a total area of 449.7 square miles (1,165 km^{2}), of which, 442.8 square miles (1,147 km^{2}) of it is land and 6.9 square miles (18 km^{2}) of it (1.54%) is water.

=== Climate ===
As with much of South Central Alaska, Skwentna has a dry-summer subarctic climate (Köppen climate classification: Dsc), with long, cold, snowy winters and short, warm summers, although, as is more typical of the Alaska Interior, August averages cooler than June; the town is also located in USDA Plant Hardiness Zone 3, indicating the coldest temperature of the year is typically in the −40 to −30 °F (−40 to −34 °C). In summer, temperatures reach 70 °F (21 °C) on 39 days and 80 °F (27 °C) on 4.6, with an average of 18 nights remaining above 50 °F (10 °C). August through October is the wettest period of the year, while snow typically falls from October to April (rarely May or September), accumulating 119 inches (3.02 m).

Climate data for Skwentna, Alaska, 1991-2020 normals, 1939-2020 extremes: 150 ft (46 m)
Month	Jan	Feb	Mar	Apr	May	Jun	Jul	Aug	Sep	Oct	Nov	Dec	Year
Record high °F (°C)	44 (7)	50 (10)	55 (13)	68 (20)	85 (29)	95 (35)	90 (32)	88 (31)	78 (26)	69 (21)	47 (8)	42 (6)	95 (35)
Mean maximum °F (°C)	34.8 (1.6)	37.6 (3.1)	46.3 (7.9)	55.6 (13.1)	71.9 (22.2)	79.6 (26.4)	80.7 (27.1)	77.5 (25.3)	66.4 (19.1)	52.6 (11.4)	37.1 (2.8)	34.9 (1.6)	81.5 (27.5)
Mean daily maximum °F (°C)	16.8 (−8.4)	25.2 (−3.8)	34.2 (1.2)	46.3 (7.9)	59.6 (15.3)	68.6 (20.3)	70.1 (21.2)	65.9 (18.8)	55.7 (13.2)	41.2 (5.1)	24.4 (−4.2)	19.0 (−7.2)	43.9 (6.6)
Daily mean °F (°C)	9.0 (−12.8)	16.1 (−8.8)	22.6 (−5.2)	35.8 (2.1)	47.8 (8.8)	56.7 (13.7)	59.8 (15.4)	56.1 (13.4)	46.7 (8.2)	33.7 (0.9)	17.9 (−7.8)	11.9 (−11.2)	34.5 (1.4)
Mean daily minimum °F (°C)	1.3 (−17.1)	7.0 (−13.9)	10.9 (−11.7)	25.3 (−3.7)	36.0 (2.2)	44.8 (7.1)	49.5 (9.7)	46.3 (7.9)	37.7 (3.2)	26.2 (−3.2)	11.4 (−11.4)	4.8 (−15.1)	25.1 (−3.8)
Mean minimum °F (°C)	−29.0 (−33.9)	−26.0 (−32.2)	−15.2 (−26.2)	3.9 (−15.6)	24.0 (−4.4)	33.3 (0.7)	38.9 (3.8)	33.8 (1.0)	21.5 (−5.8)	3.7 (−15.7)	−15.9 (−26.6)	−27.3 (−32.9)	−36.5 (−38.1)
Record low °F (°C)	−52 (−47)	−53 (−47)	−43 (−42)	−40 (−40)	4 (−16)	28 (−2)	30 (−1)	25 (−4)	−6 (−21)	−19 (−28)	−32 (−36)	−50 (−46)	−53 (−47)
Average precipitation inches (mm)	2.31 (59)	2.22 (56)	1.02 (26)	1.06 (27)	1.12 (28)	1.26 (32)	2.24 (57)	3.46 (88)	4.25 (108)	3.21 (82)	2.21 (56)	3.50 (89)	27.86 (708)
Average snowfall inches (cm)	18.1 (46)	17.9 (45)	9.6 (24)	6.0 (15)	0.1 (0.25)	0.0 (0.0)	0.0 (0.0)	0.0 (0.0)	0.3 (0.76)	11.2 (28)	22.3 (57)	33.8 (86)	119.3 (302.01)
Average extreme snow depth inches (cm)	38.6 (98)	44.7 (114)	42.1 (107)	36.5 (93)	9.1 (23)	0.0 (0.0)	0.0 (0.0)	0.0 (0.0)	0.2 (0.51)	8.1 (21)	18.3 (46)	32.1 (82)	48.5 (123)
Average precipitation days (≥ 0.01 in)	8.8	6.8	6.2	5.9	6.9	8.3	10.3	12.2	12.6	10.7	8.9	10.8	108.4
Average snowy days (≥ 0.1 in)	8.0	5.8	4.6	2.9	0.1	0.0	0.0	0.0	0.2	3.6	7.0	9.5	41.7
Source 1: NOAA(1981-2010 precip/snowfall)
Source 2: XMACIS2 (records, 1981-2010 monthly max/mins & snow depth)

Hayes River is a weather station near Skwentna to the northeast, at an elevation of 1,000 feet (300 m). Hayes River also has a subarctic climate (Köppen Dfc) but has a lower seasonal temperature variation and receives substantially more snow.

Climate data for Hayes River, Alaska, 1991-2020 normals, 1980-2020 extremes: 1,000 ft (300 m)
Month	Jan	Feb	Mar	Apr	May	Jun	Jul	Aug	Sep	Oct	Nov	Dec	Year
Record high °F (°C)	49 (9)	55 (13)	53 (12)	70 (21)	81 (27)	89 (32)	87 (31)	85 (29)	79 (26)	58 (14)	44 (7)	40 (4)	89 (32)
Mean maximum °F (°C)	34.2 (1.2)	38.9 (3.8)	42.1 (5.6)	48.8 (9.3)	64.8 (18.2)	77.3 (25.2)	79.0 (26.1)	75.7 (24.3)	64.9 (18.3)	48.4 (9.1)	36.6 (2.6)	33.7 (0.9)	80.2 (26.8)
Mean daily maximum °F (°C)	22.0 (−5.6)	28.2 (−2.1)	34.2 (1.2)	44.9 (7.2)	55.7 (13.2)	67.2 (19.6)	68.9 (20.5)	66.0 (18.9)	56.0 (13.3)	41.0 (5.0)	28.0 (−2.2)	23.2 (−4.9)	44.6 (7.0)
Daily mean °F (°C)	13.6 (−10.2)	18.4 (−7.6)	22.2 (−5.4)	34.0 (1.1)	43.8 (6.6)	54.5 (12.5)	58.1 (14.5)	55.4 (13.0)	46.2 (7.9)	32.0 (0.0)	19.8 (−6.8)	14.9 (−9.5)	34.4 (1.3)
Mean daily minimum °F (°C)	5.2 (−14.9)	8.6 (−13.0)	10.2 (−12.1)	23.1 (−4.9)	31.8 (−0.1)	41.8 (5.4)	47.3 (8.5)	44.7 (7.1)	36.4 (2.4)	23.0 (−5.0)	11.6 (−11.3)	6.7 (−14.1)	24.2 (−4.3)
Mean minimum °F (°C)	−18.2 (−27.9)	−14.2 (−25.7)	−9.2 (−22.9)	1.5 (−16.9)	23.2 (−4.9)	32.2 (0.1)	39.6 (4.2)	33.9 (1.1)	23.2 (−4.9)	5.2 (−14.9)	−8.5 (−22.5)	−14.3 (−25.7)	−21.3 (−29.6)
Record low °F (°C)	−34 (−37)	−32 (−36)	−26 (−32)	−21 (−29)	−5 (−21)	28 (−2)	35 (2)	26 (−3)	7 (−14)	−12 (−24)	−25 (−32)	−29 (−34)	−34 (−37)
Average precipitation inches (mm)	4.86 (123)	3.12 (79)	1.92 (49)	1.37 (35)	1.23 (31)	1.55 (39)	2.46 (62)	3.57 (91)	4.42 (112)	3.27 (83)	2.92 (74)	4.43 (113)	35.12 (891)
Average snowfall inches (cm)	48.1 (122)	33.3 (85)	24.3 (62)	12.4 (31)	1.7 (4.3)	0.0 (0.0)	0.0 (0.0)	0.0 (0.0)	0.6 (1.5)	10.4 (26)	34.1 (87)	57.3 (146)	222.2 (564.8)
Average extreme snow depth inches (cm)	59.4 (151)	63.9 (162)	64.1 (163)	57.4 (146)	32.3 (82)	0.9 (2.3)	0.0 (0.0)	0.0 (0.0)	0.9 (2.3)	7.5 (19)	25.8 (66)	46.7 (119)	71.2 (181)
Average precipitation days (≥ 0.01 in)	11.1	9.7	7.2	6.6	7.3	8.9	13.5	14.6	14.6	11.4	11.0	13.5	129.4
Average snowy days (≥ 0.1 in)	9.7	8.5	5.8	3.0	0.7	0.0	0.0	0.0	0.3	3.8	9.3	12.2	53.3
Source 1: NOAA(1981-2010 precip/snowfall)
Source 2: XMACIS2 (records, 1981-2010 monthly max/mins & snow depth)

== Demographics ==
Historical population
Census	Pop.	Note	%±
1950	58		—
1990	85		—
2000	111		30.6%
2010	37		−66.7%
2020	62		67.6%
U.S. Decennial Census

Skwentna first appeared on the 1950 U.S. Census as an unincorporated village. It did not appear again until 1990, when it was made a census-designated place (CDP).

As of the census of 2000, there were 111 people, 50 households, and 29 families residing in the CDP. The population density was 0.3 inhabitants per square mile (0.12/km^{2}). There were 360 housing units at an average density of 0.8 per square mile (0.31/km^{2}). The racial makeup of the CDP was 92.79% White, 6.31% Native American, and 0.90% from two or more races.

There were 50 households, out of which 22% had children under the age of 18 living with them, 48% were married couples living together, 6% had a female householder with no husband present, and 42% were non-families. 36% of all households were made up of individuals, and none had someone living alone who was 65 years of age or older. The average household size was 2.22 and the average family size was 2.90.

In the CDP, the population was spread out, with 22.5% under the age of 18, 5.4% from 18 to 24, 23.4% from 25 to 44, 44.1% from 45 to 64, and 4.5% who were 65 years of age or older. The median age was 45 years. For every 100 females, there were 164.3 males. For every 100 females age 18 and over, there were 168.8 males.

The median income for a household in the CDP was $16,250, and the median income for a family was $52,917. Males had a median income of $13,333 versus $18,750 for females. The per capita income for the CDP was $23,994. There were no families and 5.8% of the population living below the poverty line, including no under eighteens and none of those over 64.
