= Skwentna Airport =

Minor public aerodrome in Alaska, USA

- IATA: SKW; ICAO: PASW; FAA LID: SKW

Summary
- Airport type: Public
- Owner: State of Alaska DOT&PF - Central Region
- Serves: Skwentna, Alaska
- Elevation AMSL: 148 ft / 45 m
- Coordinates: 61°57′55″N 151°11′29″W

Map
- Location of airport in Alaska

Runways
Direction	Length		Surface
Direction	ft	m	Surface
10/28	3,400	1,036	Gravel

Statistics (2009)
- Aircraft operations: 3,500
- Source: Federal Aviation Administration

Skwentna Airport (IATA: SKW, ICAO: PASW, FAA LID: SKW) is a state-owned public-use airport located in Skwentna, in the Matanuska-Susitna Borough of the U.S. state of Alaska.

As per Federal Aviation Administration records, the airport had 496 passenger boardings (enplanements) in calendar year 2008, an increase of 64% from the 303 enplanements in 2007. This airport is included in the FAA's National Plan of Integrated Airport Systems for 2009–2013, which categorized it as a general aviation facility.

== Facilities and aircraft ==
Skwentna Airport covers an area of 130 acres (53 ha) at an elevation of 148 feet (45 m) above mean sea level. It has one runway designated 10/28 with a gravel surface measuring 3,400 by 75 feet (1,036 x 23 m). For the 12-month period ending December 31, 2009, the airport had 3,500 aircraft operations, an average of 291 per month: 71% general aviation and 29% air taxi.

== See also ==
- List of airports in Alaska
