= Susitna North, Alaska =

- CDP
- Location in Matanuska-Susitna Borough and the state of Alaska

- Location within the state of Alaska
- Coordinates: 62°2′12″N 149°59′14″W
- Country: United States
- State: Alaska
- Borough: Matanuska-Susitna

Government
  - Borough mayor: Edna DeVries
  - State senator: Mike Shower (R)
  - State rep.: Kevin McCabe (R)

Area
  - Total: 277.18 sq mi (717.90 km^{2})
  - Land: 276.01 sq mi (714.85 km^{2})
  - Water: 1.18 sq mi (3.05 km^{2})

Population (2020)
  - Total: 1,564
  - Density: 5.7/sq mi (2.19/km^{2})
- Time zone: UTC-9 (Alaska (AKST))
  - Summer (DST): UTC-8 (AKDT)
- ZIP Code: 99688
- Area code: 907
- FIPS code: 02-86470

Susitna North (commonly known as Sunshine) is a census-designated place (CDP) in the Matanuska-Susitna Borough in the U.S. state of Alaska. It is part of the Anchorage, Alaska Metropolitan Statistical Area. The population was 1,564 at the 2020 census, up from 1,260 in 2010. The CDP was formerly named Y (/ˈwaɪ/), for the intersection of the George Parks Highway and the Talkeetna Spur Road. In the immediate vicinity of this intersection is a community center, containing a health clinic, law enforcement (Alaska State Troopers), Susitna Valley High School, and retail services for highway travelers such as gasoline and food.

== History ==
Ahtna-speaking Athabascans lived in the Talkeetna Mountains and had a village opposite the mouth of Sunshine Creek called "Tsuk Qayeh", meaning "Old Village". Dena'ina-speaking Athabascans lived along the Deshka River and the middle Susitna River in the winter, below present-day Talkeetna. A Dena'ina village was located on the North Fork of the Kashwitna River, with a trail to Chickaloon, Alaska. Montana Creek became a small Dena'ina village in about 1915 during construction of the Alaska Railroad. Through 1927, the railroad brought employment and settlement to the area. Montana, at Mile 209.3, was one of the first construction camps. In 1918, a spur was constructed to a coal mine in the area. Sunshine Depot at Mile 215.3 was established in 1918, but was moved to higher ground in 1936. Construction of the Parks Highway and state land disposals led to settlement of the area.

== Geography ==
Y is located at 62°2′12″N 149°59′14″W (62.154270, -149.79892) (Sec. 22, T024N, R003W, Seward Meridian) in the Palmer Recording District.

Y is the developed area between Willow and Talkeetna along the George Parks Highway. The Parks Highway and Talkeetna Spur Road form what is locally known as the "Talkeetna Y" at mile 98.7 (km 158.8) of the Parks Highway. Y includes Montana Creek and Sunshine. January temperatures range from −40 to 51 °F (−40 to 11 °C); July can range from 26 to 90 °F (−3 to 32 °C). Precipitation ranges from 14 to 29 inches (36 to 74 cm), with 48–70 inches (120–180 cm) of snowfall.

According to the United States Census Bureau, the CDP has a total area of 336.5 square miles (872 km^{2}), of which, 333.4 square miles (864 km^{2}) of it is land and 3.1 square miles (8.0 km^{2}) of it (0.92%) is water.

== Demographics ==
Historical population
Census	Pop.	Note	%±
1960	39		—
1970	33		−15.4%
1980	40		21.2%
2000	956		—
2010	1,260		31.8%
2020	1,564		24.1%
U.S. Decennial Census

Susitna North first appeared on the 1960 U.S. Census as the unincorporated village of "Montana." Montana was made a census-designated place (CDP) in 1980. It was dissolved in 1990. In 2000, the new CDP of "Y" was created. As of 2010, the name was changed to the present Susitna North.

=== 2020 census ===
As of the 2020 census, Susitna North had a population of 1,564. The median age was 50.4 years. 18.0% of residents were under the age of 18 and 22.4% of residents were 65 years of age or older. For every 100 females there were 108.0 males, and for every 100 females age 18 and over there were 113.1 males age 18 and over.

0.0% of residents lived in urban areas, while 100.0% lived in rural areas.

There were 702 households in Susitna North, of which 19.8% had children under the age of 18 living in them. Of all households, 45.7% were married-couple households, 29.3% were households with a male householder and no spouse or partner present, and 17.1% were households with a female householder and no spouse or partner present. About 32.8% of all households were made up of individuals and 13.6% had someone living alone who was 65 years of age or older.

There were 1,772 housing units, of which 60.4% were vacant. The homeowner vacancy rate was 2.6% and the rental vacancy rate was 3.4%.

Racial composition as of the 2020 census
Race	Number	Percent
White	1,318	84.3%
Black or African American	1	0.1%
American Indian and Alaska Native	74	4.7%
Asian	11	0.7%
Native Hawaiian and Other Pacific Islander	0	0.0%
Some other race	35	2.2%
Two or more races	125	8.0%
Hispanic or Latino (of any race)	63	4.0%

=== 2000 census ===
As of the census of 2000, there were 956 people, 412 households, and 252 families residing in the CDP. The population density was 2.9 inhabitants per square mile (1.1/km^{2}). There were 818 housing units at an average density of 2.5 per square mile (0.97/km^{2}). The racial makeup of the CDP was 85.88% White, 0.63% Black or African American, 6.59% Native American, 0.63% Asian, 0.84% from other races, and 5.44% from two or more races. 2.30% of the population were Hispanic or Latino of any race.

There were 412 households, out of which 29.1% had children under the age of 18 living with them, 46.6% were married couples living together, 9.2% had a female householder with no husband present, and 38.6% were non-families. 32.3% of all households were made up of individuals, and 6.3% had someone living alone who was 65 years of age or older. The average household size was 2.32 and the average family size was 2.90.

In the CDP, the population was spread out, with 24.8% under the age of 18, 5.3% from 18 to 24, 29.4% from 25 to 44, 32.0% from 45 to 64, and 8.5% who were 65 years of age or older. The median age was 41 years. For every 100 females, there were 117.3 males. For every 100 females age 18 and over, there were 118.5 males.

The median income for a household in the CDP was $31,848, and the median income for a family was $38,304. Males had a median income of $54,500 versus $35,625 for females. The per capita income for the CDP was $15,437. About 9.5% of families and 17.4% of the population were below the poverty line, including 12.4% of those under age 18 and 13.2% of those age 65 or over.

== Economy and transportation ==
The area of the Talkeetna Spur Rd. and George Parks intersection has the highest density of businesses (grocery store, gas station, hardware store, banking). Some residents are self-employed in a variety of small businesses, including lodging, guiding and charter services. Some residents are employed in the Palmer/Wasilla area. The community is accessible from the George Parks Highway. The Talkeetna airstrip is located nearby. A variety of transportation means are available in Wasilla, Palmer and Anchorage.

== Facilities, utilities, schools, and health care ==
The majority of occupied homes have individual wells, septic tanks, and complete plumbing or haul water and have outhouses. Seasonal-use homes haul water and use outhouses. Talkeetna Refuse operates a refuse transfer station at Y, at mile .5 of the Talkeetna Spur Rd. Electricity is provided by Matanuska Electric Association. There is a Jr/Sr. High School located in the community, attended by about 200 students. Local hospitals or health clinics include Sunshine Community Health Center at mile 4 of the Talkeetna Spur Rd. or Dr. James Yates in Talkeetna or Mat-Su Regional Medical Center Located between Wasilla and Palmer at the Junction of the Parks Hwy. and Glenn Hwy. Auxiliary health care is provided by Talkeetna Ambulance Service; Trapper Creek Ambulance Service; Sunshine Community Health Center; Mat-Su Regional Medical Center or Anchorage hospitals.

== See also ==
- Y – a town in France
