= Eureka, Alaska =

The place name Eureka in the U.S. state of Alaska may refer to:

- Eureka Roadhouse, Alaska, a census-designated place (CDP) in the Matanuska-Susitna Borough
- An historic name for Kantishna, Alaska, an unincorporated community in the Denali Borough
- A small rural community within the CDP boundaries of Manley Hot Springs, Alaska, in the Yukon–Koyukuk Census Area
