= Gateway, Alaska =

- CDP
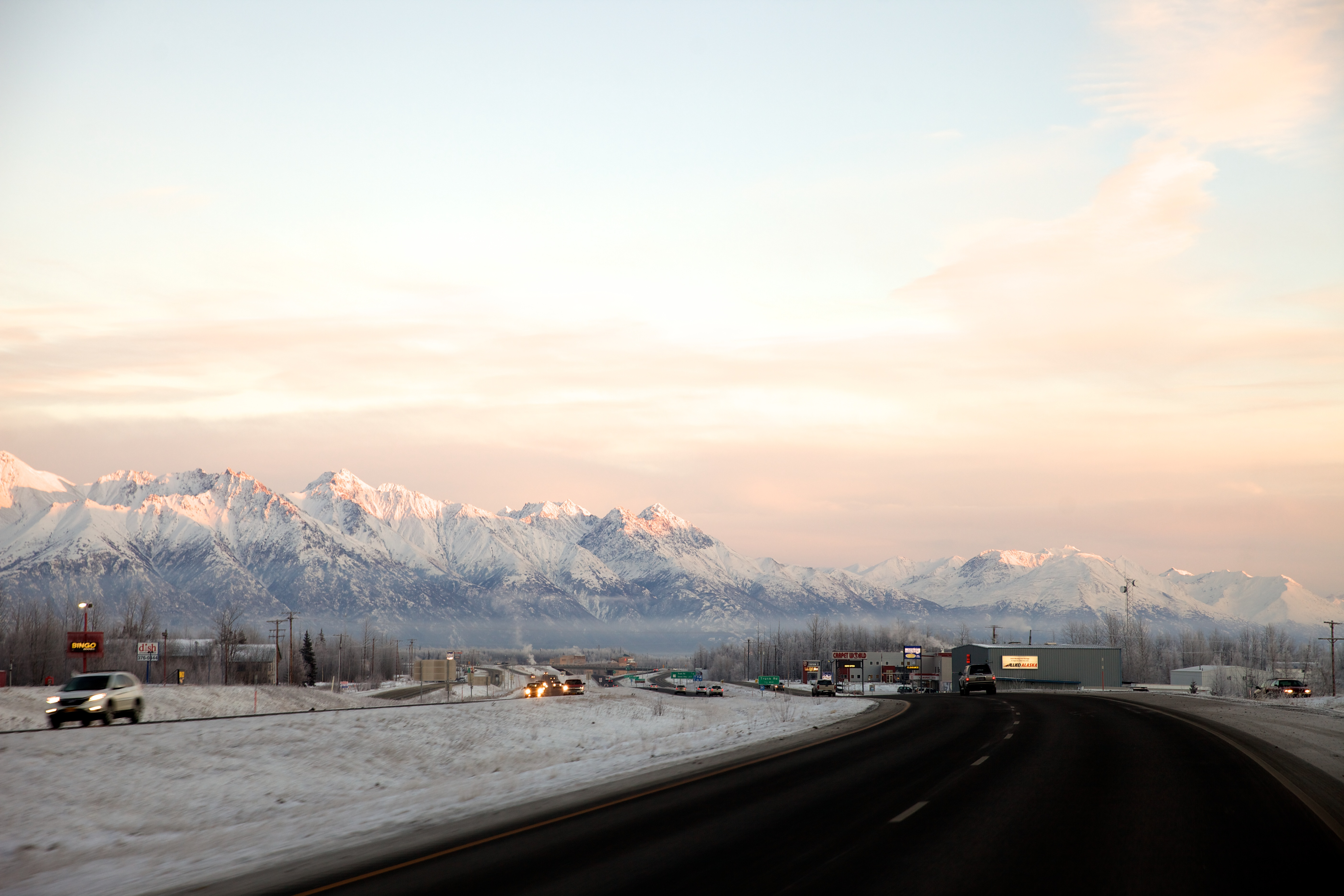
- Southbound George Parks Highway approaching the Trunk Road interchange. The Chugach Mountains and Mat-Su Regional Medical Center are in the background.

- Location in Matanuska-Susitna Borough and the state of Alaska

- Location within the state of Alaska
- Coordinates: 61°34′35″N 149°15′9″W
- Country: United States
- State: Alaska
- Borough: Matanuska-Susitna

Government
  - Borough mayor: Edna DeVries
  - State senators: Shelley Hughes (R); David Wilson (R)
  - State reps.: DeLena Johnson (R); Jesse Sumner (R); Cathy Tilton (R)

Area
  - Total: 18.88 sq mi (48.90 km^{2})
  - Land: 18.36 sq mi (47.56 km^{2})
  - Water: 0.52 sq mi (1.34 km^{2})
- Elevation: 200 ft (61 m)

Population (2020)
  - Total: 5,748
  - Density: 313.0/sq mi (120.85/km^{2})
- Time zone: UTC-9 (Alaska (AKST))
  - Summer (DST): UTC-8 (AKDT)
- Area code: 907
- FIPS code: 02-28200
- GNIS feature ID: 1865553

Gateway is a census-designated place (CDP) in Matanuska-Susitna Borough, Alaska, United States. It is part of the Anchorage, Alaska Metropolitan Statistical Area. The population was 5,748 at the 2020 census, up from 5,552 in 2010. Gateway is the fifth-most populated CDP in the borough.

== Geography ==
Gateway is located at 61°34′35″N 149°15′9″W (61.576398, -149.252506).

According to the United States Census Bureau, the CDP has a total area of 16.8 square miles (44 km^{2}), of which, 16.3 square miles (42 km^{2}) of it is land and 0.5 square miles (1.3 km^{2}) of it (3.04%) is water.

== Demographics ==
Historical population
Census	Pop.	Note	%±
2000	2,952		—
2010	5,552		88.1%
2020	5,748		3.5%
U.S. Decennial Census

Gateway first appeared on the 2000 U.S. Census as an unincorporated census-designated place (CDP).

=== 2020 census ===
As of the 2020 census, Gateway had a population of 5,748. The median age was 33.5 years. 33.0% of residents were under the age of 18 and 9.7% of residents were 65 years of age or older. For every 100 females there were 103.5 males, and for every 100 females age 18 and over there were 101.5 males age 18 and over.

66.1% of residents lived in urban areas, while 33.9% lived in rural areas.

There were 1,850 households in Gateway, of which 45.8% had children under the age of 18 living in them. Of all households, 64.4% were married-couple households, 15.5% were households with a male householder and no spouse or partner present, and 14.5% were households with a female householder and no spouse or partner present. About 15.9% of all households were made up of individuals and 4.4% had someone living alone who was 65 years of age or older.

There were 2,018 housing units, of which 8.3% were vacant. The homeowner vacancy rate was 1.6% and the rental vacancy rate was 10.8%.

Racial composition as of the 2020 census
Race	Number	Percent
White	4,441	77.3%
Black or African American	95	1.7%
American Indian and Alaska Native	266	4.6%
Asian	110	1.9%
Native Hawaiian and Other Pacific Islander	21	0.4%
Some other race	100	1.7%
Two or more races	715	12.4%
Hispanic or Latino (of any race)	328	5.7%

=== 2000 census ===
As of the census of 2000, there were 2,952 people, 981 households, and 781 families residing in the CDP. The population density was 181.5 inhabitants per square mile (70.1/km^{2}). There were 1,084 housing units at an average density of 66.6 per square mile (25.7/km^{2}). The racial makeup of the CDP was 88.3% White, 0.7% Black or African American, 4.0% Native American, 0.9% Asian, 0.1% Pacific Islander, 1.0% from other races, and 5.0% from two or more races. 2.4% of the population were Hispanic or Latino of any race.

There were 981 households, out of which 49.6% had children under the age of 18 living with them, 66.8% were married couples living together, 7.8% had a female householder with no husband present, and 20.3% were non-families. 15.8% of all households were made up of individuals, and 2.7% had someone living alone who was 65 years of age or older. The average household size was 3.01 and the average family size was 3.36.

In the CDP, the population was spread out, with 34.5% under the age of 18, 6.2% from 18 to 24, 31.6% from 25 to 44, 22.6% from 45 to 64, and 5.1% who were 65 years of age or older. The median age was 33 years. For every 100 females, there were 100.0 males. For every 100 females age 18 and over, there were 101.8 males.

The median income for a household in the CDP was $60,385, and the median income for a family was $65,990. Males had a median income of $51,250 versus $37,135 for females. The per capita income for the CDP was $24,548. About 5.2% of families and 7.2% of the population were below the poverty line, including 12.3% of those under age 18 and 4.0% of those age 65 or over.
