= Butte, Alaska =

- CDP
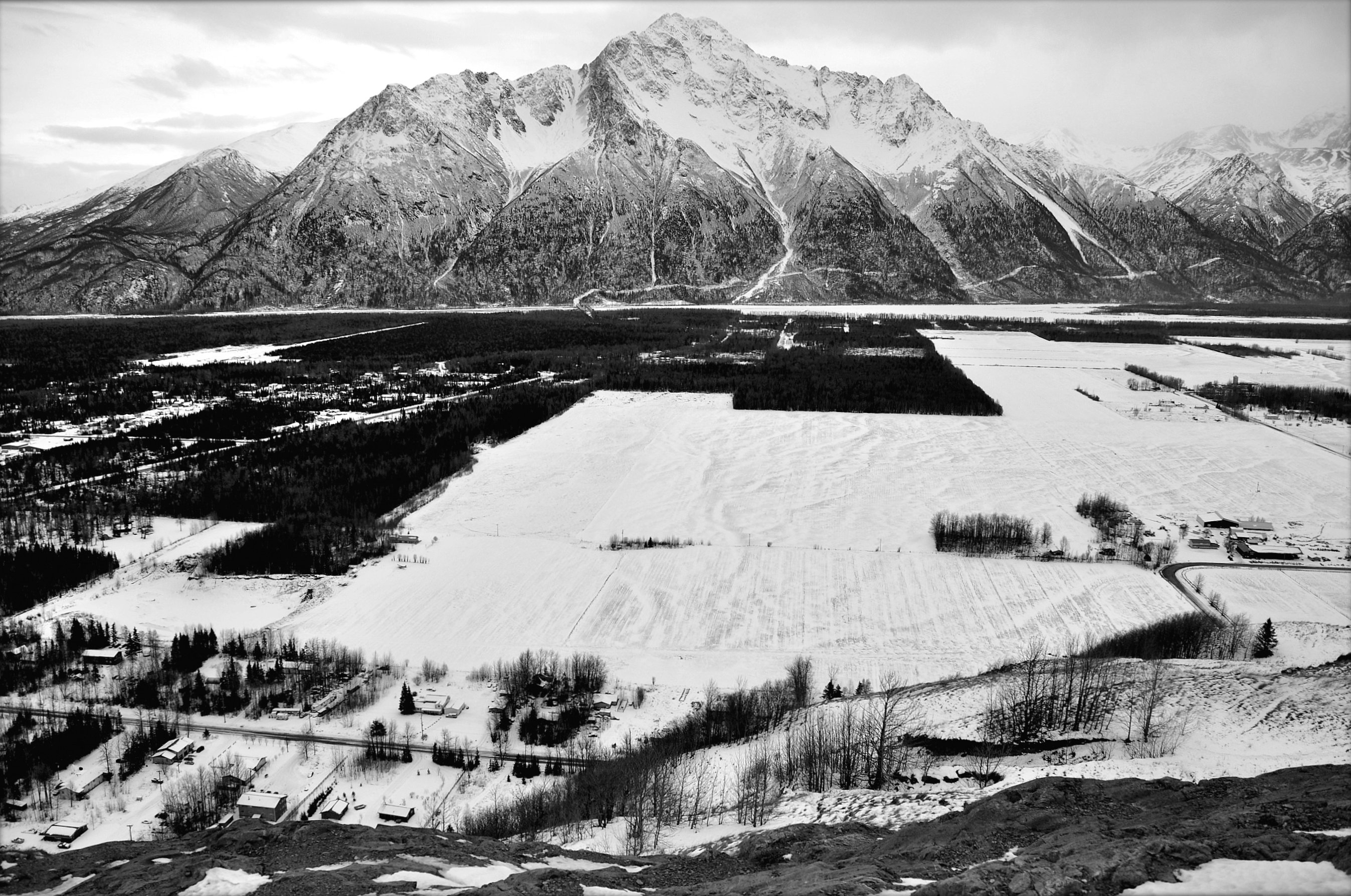
- View looking south from atop Bodenburg Butte

- Location in Matanuska-Susitna Borough and the state of Alaska
- Coordinates: 61°32′53″N 149°1′36″W
- Country: United States
- State: Alaska
- Borough: Matanuska-Susitna

Government
  - Borough mayor: Edna DeVries
  - State senator: Shelley Hughes (R)
  - State rep.: DeLena Johnson (R)

Area
  - Total: 34.87 sq mi (90.31 km^{2})
  - Land: 33.79 sq mi (87.52 km^{2})
  - Water: 1.08 sq mi (2.79 km^{2})
- Elevation: 92 ft (28 m)

Population (2020)
  - Total: 3,589
  - Density: 106.2/sq mi (41.01/km^{2})
- Time zone: UTC-9 (Alaska (AKST))
  - Summer (DST): UTC-8 (AKDT)
- ZIP code: 99645
- Area code: 907
- FIPS code: 02-09710
- GNIS feature ID: 1416898

Butte is a census-designated place (CDP) in Matanuska-Susitna Borough, Alaska, United States. It is part of the Anchorage, Alaska Metropolitan Statistical Area. At the 2020 census, the population was 3,589, up from 3,246 in 2010. Butte is located between the Matanuska River and the Knik River, approximately 5 miles (8 km) southeast of Palmer. It is accessible via the Old Glenn Highway.

== Education ==
Butte has its own elementary school, although the closest high school is Palmer High School.

== Recreation ==
The town of Butte surrounds the geological formation Bodenburg Butte (Hutnaynut'i in the indigenous Dena'ina language), from which the town draws its name. There are two hikes to the 900-foot summit, which offers 360-degree views of the surrounding Matanuska Valley and distant Knik Glacier.

Located within the town is the Knik River Public Use Area (KRPUA), which provides a full spectrum of outdoor recreational opportunities and is open to motorized and non-motorized recreational pursuits. Activities common to the area include riding off-highway vehicles (OHVs), hunting, fishing, trapping, target shooting, boating, flying planes, horseback riding, biking, hiking, camping, and wildlife viewing.

Butte is also home to the Alaska Raceway Park, which has been operating for more than 50 years. The track holds races from Mother’s Day until Labor Day and most between. The 1/3 mile asphalt oval track is certified for NASCAR races in the Whelen All American Series.

Located on the southern flank of the Bodenburg Butte is the Williams Reindeer Farm, which has been operating since 1987. The Reindeer farm is featured in an episode of Discovery's Dirty Jobs.

== Economy ==
The economic backbone of Butte is a substantial agricultural network of producing farms as well as the State of Alaska Plant Materials Center. Organic and conventional farms in the area supply a bounty of produce to the local farmer's markets of the surrounding areas.

A variety of other small businesses in the area include equestrian centers, coffee shops and restaurants, various auto and fleet repair shops, Butte Municipal Airport, a boatbuilder and 2 fire stations.

== Geography ==
Butte is located at 61°32′53″N 149°1′36″W (61.548030, -149.026617).

According to the United States Census Bureau, the CDP has a total area of 41.0 square miles (106 km^{2}), of which 40.3 square miles (104 km^{2}) of it is land and 0.7 square miles (1.8 km^{2}) of it (1.80%) is water.

== Demographics ==
Historical population
Census	Pop.	Note	%±
1960	559		—
1970	448		−19.9%
1980	988		120.5%
1990	2,039		106.4%
2000	2,561		25.6%
2010	3,246		26.7%
2020	3,589		10.6%
U.S. Decennial Census

Butte first appeared on the 1960 U.S. Census as an unincorporated village. In 1980, the name was changed to "Bodenburg Butte" and was made a census-designated place (CDP). In 1990, the name reverted to Butte.

=== 2020 census ===
As of the 2020 census, Butte had a population of 3,589. The median age was 40.8 years. 24.6% of residents were under the age of 18 and 15.8% of residents were 65 years of age or older. For every 100 females there were 101.5 males, and for every 100 females age 18 and over there were 101.9 males age 18 and over.

0.0% of residents lived in urban areas, while 100.0% lived in rural areas.

There were 1,297 households in Butte, of which 30.4% had children under the age of 18 living in them. Of all households, 58.0% were married-couple households, 18.2% were households with a male householder and no spouse or partner present, and 18.6% were households with a female householder and no spouse or partner present. About 22.2% of all households were made up of individuals and 8.4% had someone living alone who was 65 years of age or older.

There were 1,476 housing units, of which 12.1% were vacant. The homeowner vacancy rate was 0.9% and the rental vacancy rate was 4.9%.

Racial composition as of the 2020 census
Race	Number	Percent
White	2,971	82.8%
Black or African American	19	0.5%
American Indian and Alaska Native	176	4.9%
Asian	41	1.1%
Native Hawaiian and Other Pacific Islander	2	0.1%
Some other race	63	1.8%
Two or more races	317	8.8%
Hispanic or Latino (of any race)	89	2.5%

=== 2000 census ===
As of the 2000 census, there were 2,561 people, 884 households, and 671 families residing in the CDP. The population density was 63.6 inhabitants per square mile (24.6/km^{2}). There were 964 housing units at an average density of 23.9 per square mile (9.2/km^{2}). The racial makeup of the CDP was 92.5% White, 0.5% Black or African American, 2.9% Native American, 0.1% Asian, 0.1% Pacific Islander, 0.5% from other races, and 3.4% from two or more races. 1.3% of the population were Hispanic or Latino of any race.

There were 884 households, out of which 37.8% had children under the age of 18 living with them, 62.6% were married couples living together, 7.7% had a female householder with no husband present, and 24.0% were non-families. 19.3% of all households were made up of individuals, and 4.8% had someone living alone who was 65 years of age or older. The average household size was 2.89 and the average family size was 3.28.

In the CDP, the population was spread out, with 30.5% under the age of 18, 7.4% from 18 to 24, 29.2% from 25 to 44, 25.7% from 45 to 64, and 7.3% who were 65 years of age or older. The median age was 36 years. For every 100 females, there were 106.9 males. For every 100 females age 18 and over, there were 106.7 males.

The median income for a household in the CDP was $55,573, and the median income for a family was $58,796. Males had a median income of $46,298 versus $32,933 for females. The per capita income for the CDP was $22,522. About 7.2% of families and 9.8% of the population were below the poverty line, including 15.8% of those under age 18 and 3.5% of those age 65 or over.
