= Trapper Creek, Alaska =

- Census-designated place
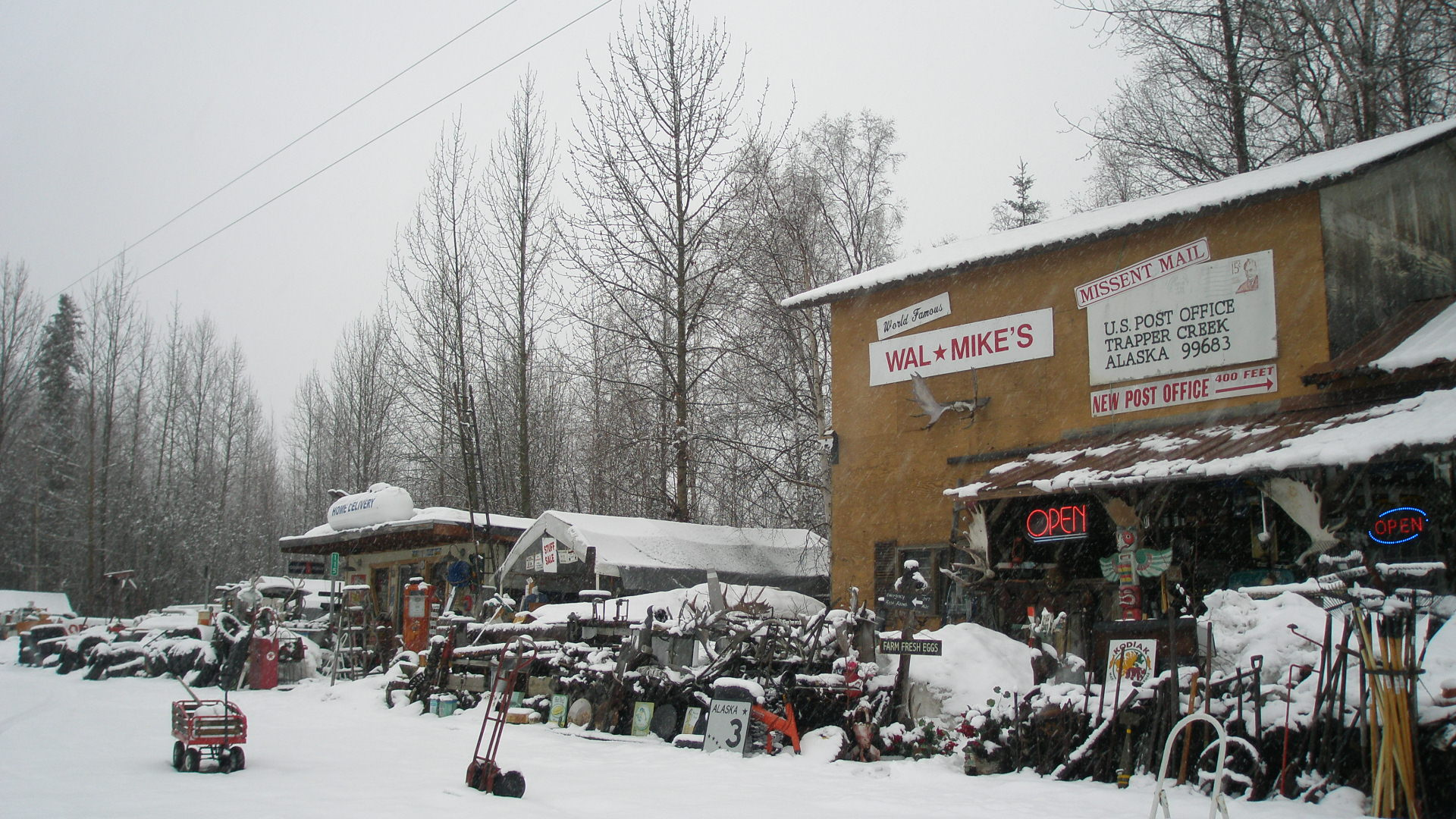

- Location in Matanuska-Susitna Borough and the state of Alaska

- Location within the state of Alaska
- Coordinates: 62°18′29″N 150°21′3″W
- Country: United States
- State: Alaska
- Borough: Matanuska-Susitna

Government
  - Borough mayor: Edna DeVries
  - State senator: Mike Shower (R)
  - State rep.: Kevin McCabe (R)

Area
  - Total: 327.81 sq mi (849.02 km^{2})
  - Land: 320.04 sq mi (828.90 km^{2})
  - Water: 7.77 sq mi (20.12 km^{2})
- Elevation: 351 ft (107 m)

Population (2020)
  - Total: 499
  - Density: 1.6/sq mi (0.6/km^{2})
- Time zone: UTC-9 (Alaska (AKST))
  - Summer (DST): UTC-8 (AKDT)
- ZIP code: 99683
- Area code: 907
- FIPS code: 02-78680
- GNIS feature ID: 1417100

Trapper Creek is a census-designated place (CDP) in Matanuska-Susitna Borough, Alaska, United States. It is part of the Anchorage Metropolitan Area and is known as the southern gateway to Denali State Park. According to the 2020 census the population of Trapper Creek was 499.

== History ==
The first permanent inhabitants of the area were brothers Oliver Rabidoux and Noah Rabidoux. These men were trappers, giving the area its name of Trapper Creek. The discovery of gold in 1905 in the Cache Creek mining district brought more people to the area. In 1914, construction on the Alaska Railroad began, prompting the opening of a district headquarters in the neighboring town of Talkeetna in 1916. This enabled miners and trappers to travel by rail to Talkeetna and then cross the Susitna River and arrive in Trapper Creek. In 1917, construction on Petersville Road, one of two major roads that run through Trapper Creek, began from the river landing.

The town grew with the arrival of homesteaders in the late 1930's. In 1939, Shorty Bradly was the first to settle permanently in the region and started a homestead along the Petersville Road. In 1959 an influx of people from Michigan, known locally as the Michigan 59'ers, staked homesteads to the west of Shorty's original homestead. In 1968, Trapper Creek was connected to the highway system as the George Parks Highway was pushed north to Fairbanks.

== Geography ==
Trapper Creek is a community located in Matanuska-Susitna Borough at latitude 62.317 and longitude -150.231, with an elevation of 351 ft (107 m). It is at mile 114.5 on the Parks Highway, just south of Denali State Park. Trapper Creek is found at the intersection of Petersville Road and is spread out along the Parks Highway 15 miles (24 km) north of Talkeetna Junction. The Trapper Creek CDP extends west down the Petersville Road, which leads to mining, prospecting, and recreation country in the foothills of the Alaska Range.

According to the United States Census Bureau, the CDP has a total area of 327.8 square miles (849 km^{2}), of which 320.0 square miles (829 km^{2}) are land and 7.8 square miles (20 km^{2}), or 2.37%, are water. The eastern border of the CDP is formed by the Chulitna and Susitna rivers.

== Demographics ==
Historical population
Census	Pop.	Note	%±
1990	296		—
2000	423		42.9%
2010	481		13.7%
2020	499		3.7%
U.S. Decennial Census

Trapper Creek first appeared on the 1990 U.S. Census as a census-designated place (CDP).

As of the census of 2000, there were 423 people, 182 households, and 123 families residing in the CDP. The population density was 1.2 inhabitants per square mile (0.46/km^{2}). There were 361 housing units at an average density of 1.0 per square mile (0.39/km^{2}). The racial makeup of the CDP was 87.71% White, 0.24% Black or African American, 8.27% Native American, 0.47% Asian, and 3.31% from two or more races. 1.18% of the population were Hispanic or Latino of any race.

There were 182 households, out of which 24.7% had children under the age of 18 living with them, 52.2% were married couples living together, 8.2% had a female householder with no husband present, and 31.9% were non-families. 28.0% of all households were made up of individuals, and 5.5% had someone living alone who was 65 years of age or older. The average household size was 2.32 and the average family size was 2.74.

In the CDP, the population was spread out, with 22.7% under the age of 18, 5.2% from 18 to 24, 23.6% from 25 to 44, 39.0% from 45 to 64, and 9.5% who were 65 years of age or older. The median age was 44 years. For every 100 females, there were 121.5 males. For every 100 females age 18 and over, there were 125.5 males.

The median income for a household in the CDP was $27,031, and the median income for a family was $34,250. Males had a median income of $65,446 versus $11,250 for females. The per capita income for the CDP was $18,247. About 27.6% of families and 24.7% of the population were below the poverty line, including 16.7% of those under age 18 and 22.6% of those age 65 or over.
