= Eureka Roadhouse, Alaska =

- Census-designated place
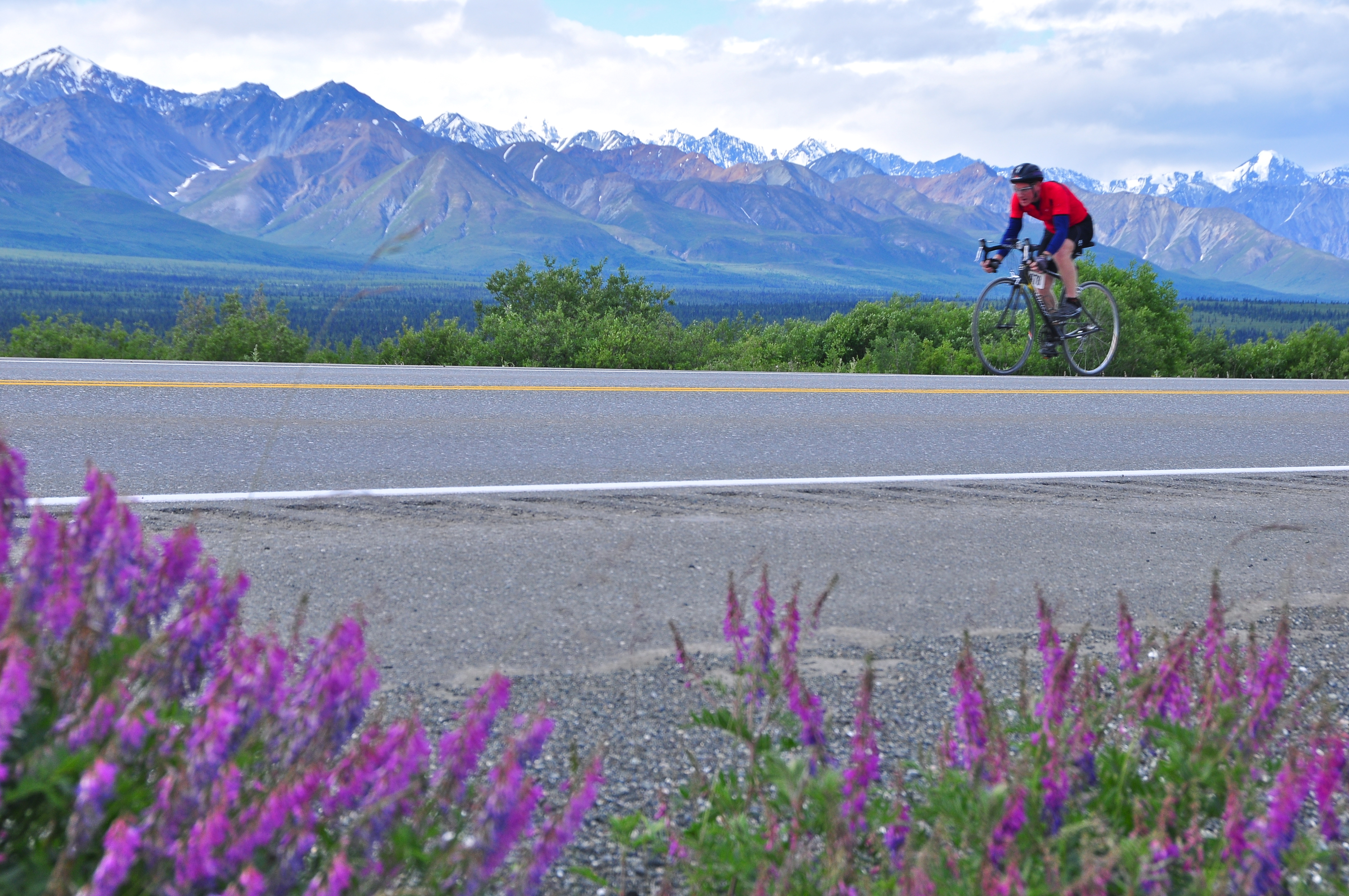
- A cyclist in the defunct Fireweed 400 race is seen passing by Eureka Lodge on the Glenn Highway in July 2010.

- Location in Matanuska-Susitna Borough and the state of Alaska

- Location within the state of Alaska
- Coordinates: 61°56′14″N 147°10′23″W
- Country: United States
- State: Alaska
- Borough: Matanuska-Susitna

Government
  - Borough mayor: Edna DeVries
  - State senator: Mike Shower (R)
  - State rep.: George Rauscher (R)

Area
  - Total: 187.34 sq mi (485.20 km^{2})
  - Land: 185.78 sq mi (481.17 km^{2})
  - Water: 1.56 sq mi (4.03 km^{2})
- Elevation: 3,287 ft (1,002 m)

Population (2020)
  - Total: 24
  - Density: 0.13/sq mi (0.05/km^{2})
- Time zone: UTC-9 (Alaska (AKST))
  - Summer (DST): UTC-8 (AKDT)
- ZIP Codes: 99588, 99674
- Area code: 907
- FIPS code: 02-23720

Eureka Roadhouse is a census-designated place (CDP) in the Matanuska-Susitna Borough in the U.S. state of Alaska. It is part of the Anchorage Metropolitan Area. The population was 24 at the 2020 census.

== Geography ==
Eureka Roadhouse is located between the CDPs of Glacier View and Nelchina on the Glenn Highway (Alaska Route 1), between the Chugach Mountains to the north and the Talkeetna Mountains to the southeast. The northern part of the CDP is occupied by the Nelchina Public Use Area.

It is 122 miles (196 km) northeast of Anchorage by road.

According to the United States Census Bureau, the CDP has a total area of 187.3 square miles (485 km^{2}), of which 185.8 square miles (481 km^{2}) are land and 1.6 square miles (4.1 km^{2}), or 0.83%, are water.

== Demographics ==
Historical population
Census	Pop.	Note	%±
2010	29		—
2020	24		−17.2%
U.S. Decennial Census

As of the census of 2010, there were 29 people, 16 households, and 6 families residing in the CDP. The population density was 0.15 inhabitants per square mile (0.058/km^{2}). The racial makeup of the CDP was 22 (75.86%) White, 0 (0.0%) Black or African American, 2 (6.9%) Native American, 1 (3.4%) Asian, 0 (0.0%) from other races, and 4 (13.8%) from two or more races. 2 (6.9%) of the population were Hispanic or Latino of any race.

There were 101 housing units, of which 16 were occupied. Of the 16 households, 3 (18.8%) had children under the age of 18 living with them, 5 (31.3%) were married couples living together, 1 (6.3%) had a female householder with no husband present, and 10 (62.5%) were non-families. 9 (56.3%) of all households were made up of individuals, and 6 (35.5%) had someone living alone who was 65 years of age or older. The average household size was 1.81 and the average family size was 2.83.

In the CDP, the population was spread out, with 5 (17.1%) under the age of 18, 2 (6.9%) from 18 to 24, 3 (10.2%) from 25 to 44, 11 (37.8%) from 45 to 64, and 8 (27.5%) who were 65 years of age or older. The median age was 53.3 years. For every 100 females, there were 222.2 males (20 males, 9 females). For every 100 females age 18 and over, there were 200 males (16 adult males, 8 adult females).

Income data was not present for Eureka Roadhouse.
