= Knik River, Alaska =

- CDP
- Location in Matanuska-Susitna Borough and the state of Alaska

- Location within the state of Alaska
- Coordinates: 61°30′28″N 149°0′13″W
- Country: United States
- State: Alaska
- Borough: Matanuska-Susitna

Government
  - Borough mayor: Edna DeVries
  - State senator: Shelley Hughes (R)
  - State rep.: DeLena Johnson (R)

Area
  - Total: 91.68 sq mi (237.44 km^{2})
  - Land: 81.72 sq mi (211.65 km^{2})
  - Water: 9.96 sq mi (25.79 km^{2})

Population (2020)
  - Total: 792
  - Density: 9.7/sq mi (3.74/km^{2})
- Time zone: UTC-9 (Alaska (AKST))
  - Summer (DST): UTC-8 (AKDT)
- Area code: 907
- FIPS code: 02-40670

Knik River /ˈknɪk/ is a census-designated place (CDP) in Matanuska-Susitna Borough in the U.S. state of Alaska. Located 15 miles southeast from Palmer along the Knik River, it is part of the Anchorage, Alaska Metropolitan Statistical Area. The population was 792 at the 2020 census, up from 744 in 2010.

== Geography and climate ==
Knik River is located at 61°28′15″N 148°51′38″W (61.470970, -148.86064) (Sec. 24, T016N, R003W, Seward Meridian), in the Palmer Recording District.

The community is at the head of the Knik Arm of Cook Inlet in Southcentral Alaska, 27 km (17 mi) northeast of Anchorage. The community has developed along the south bank of the Knik River, which flows into Knik Arm, at the southern border of the Mat-Su Borough. It lies along the Old Glenn Highway and Knik River Road.

According to the United States Census Bureau, the CDP has a total area of 93.2 square miles (241 km^{2}), of which, 90.4 square miles (234 km^{2}) of it is land and 2.8 square miles (7.3 km^{2}) of it (2.95%) is water.

=== Climate ===
The temperatures in January range from -35 °F (-37 °C) to 33 °F (1 °C); in July, 72 °F (6 °C) to 85 °F (29 °C). Annual precipitation is 16.5 inches (42 cm), including 43 inches (109 cm) of snowfall.

== History ==
The Knik (Arm area) or K′enah Ht’ana regional band of Dena'ina Athabascans were the earliest inhabitants of the region. They traveled through the area on a winter trail from Eklutna up the Knik River to the Copper River. The Palmer Road, now the Old Glenn Highway, was built through the area to Palmer in 1942. A lodge on Goat Creek was popular with travelers. The Eklutna Power Project was also built in the 1940s, including tract housing for employees. Knik River Road started as a logging road in the early 1950s; a gravel road was built in the late 1960s. The road is now paved up to Hunter Creek.

== Demographics ==
Historical population
Census	Pop.	Note	%±
2000	582		—
2010	744		27.8%
2020	792		6.5%
U.S. Decennial Census

Knik River first appeared on the 2000 U.S. Census as a census-designated place (CDP).

As of the census of 2000, there were 582 people, 216 households, and 147 families residing in the CDP. The population density was 6.4 inhabitants per square mile (2.5/km^{2}). There were 263 housing units at an average density of 2.9 per square mile (1.1/km^{2}). The racial makeup of the CDP was 85.74% White, 0.17% Black or African American, 6.70% Native American, 0.86% Pacific Islander, 1.37% from other races, and 5.15% from two or more races. 2.58% of the population were Hispanic or Latino of any race.

There were 216 households, out of which 38.9% had children under the age of 18 living with them, 57.9% were married couples living together, 5.1% had a female householder with no husband present, and 31.5% were non-families. 24.1% of all households were made up of individuals, and 4.2% had someone living alone who was 65 years of age or older. The average household size was 2.69 and the average family size was 3.22.

In the CDP, the population was spread out, with 31.3% under the age of 18, 5.3% from 18 to 24, 35.4% from 25 to 44, 23.7% from 45 to 64, and 4.3% who were 65 years of age or older. The median age was 36 years. For every 100 females, there were 108.6 males. For every 100 females age 18 and over, there were 119.8 males.

The median income for a household in the CDP was $55,000, and the median income for a family was $55,000. Males had a median income of $36,071 versus $27,143 for females. The per capita income for the CDP was $19,104. About 19.7% of families and 15.3% of the population were below the poverty line, including 23.8% of those under age 18 and none of those age 65 or over.

== Public services ==
Most homes use individual wells and septic systems. There are a few private piped systems; some residents haul water and use outhouses. The Eklutna Power Project is located in the community. The Borough provides a refuse transfer site in Butte. Electricity is provided by Matanuska Electric Association. There are no state operated schools located in the community. Local hospitals or health clinics include Valley Hospital in Palmer (746-8600) or Anchorage hospitals. Auxiliary health care is provided by Butte Ambulance Service (373-8800/745-4811), Anchorage or Palmer hospitals.

== Economy and transportation ==
Many residents are employed in Anchorage or the Palmer/Wasilla area in a variety of positions in the private and public sectors. Retail trade, transportation, and education are the primary employers.

Knik River lies off the Glenn Highway. Many forms of transportation are available in nearby Palmer and Anchorage.

=== Taxes ===
Sales: None, Property: 11.483 mills (Borough), Special: 5% Accommodations Tax (Borough)

== In popular culture ==
- Jessie Arnold, fictional Iditarod musher and protagonist of a series of murder mysteries by author Sue Henry, lives outside of the city of Palmer in the Knik River valley.
- The river is featured in the program I Shouldn't Be Alive, Season 6, Episode 4: Escape From Bear Mountain.
