= Glacier View, Alaska =

- Census-designated place
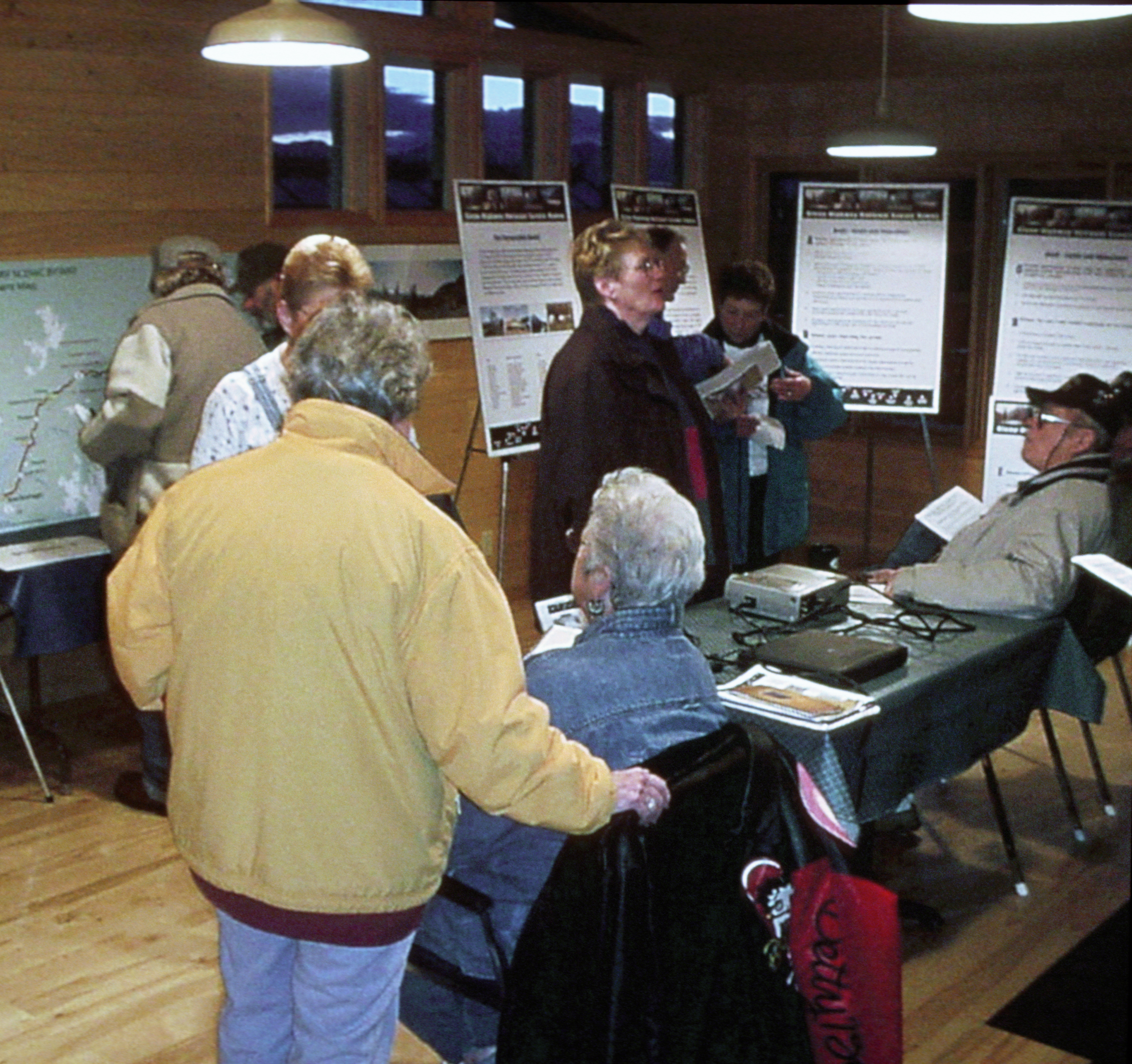
- A public meeting on the National Scenic Byways Program at Sheep Mountain Lodge in October 2001.

- Location in Matanuska-Susitna Borough and the state of Alaska

- Location in Alaska
- Coordinates: 61°49′7″N 147°42′53″W
- Country: United States
- State: Alaska
- Borough: Matanuska-Susitna

Government
  - Borough mayor: Edna DeVries
  - State senator: Mike Shower (R)
  - State rep.: George Rauscher (R)

Area
  - Total: 234.33 sq mi (606.90 km^{2})
  - Land: 232.12 sq mi (601.18 km^{2})
  - Water: 2.21 sq mi (5.72 km^{2})

Population (2020)
  - Total: 375
  - Density: 1.6/sq mi (0.62/km^{2})
- Time zone: UTC-9 (Alaska (AKST))
  - Summer (DST): UTC-8 (AKDT)
- Area code: 907
- FIPS code: 02-28590

Glacier View is a census-designated place (CDP) in Matanuska-Susitna Borough, Alaska, United States. It is part of the Anchorage Metropolitan Area. At the 2020 census the population was 375, up from 234 in 2010. The terminus of Matanuska Glacier is located approximately three miles southwest of Glacier View.

== Geography ==
Glacier View is located in the eastern part of Matanuska-Susitna Borough at 61°49′7″N 147°42′53″W (61.818532, -147.714741). It is bordered to the east by the Eureka Roadhouse CDP and to the west by the Chickaloon CDP. It is on the north side of the valley of the Matanuska River, along Alaska Route 1, the Glenn Highway, which leads west 60 miles (97 km) to Palmer and east 78 miles (126 km) to Alaska Route 4 in Glennallen.

According to the United States Census Bureau, the Glacier View CDP has a total area of 234.3 square miles (607 km^{2}), of which 232.1 square miles (601 km^{2}) are land and 2.2 square miles (5.7 km^{2}), or 0.94%, are water.

== Demographics ==
Historical population
Census	Pop.	Note	%±
2000	249		—
2010	234		−6.0%
2020	375		60.3%
U.S. Decennial Census

Glacier View first appeared on the 2000 U.S. Census as a census-designated place (CDP).

As of the census of 2000, there were 249 people, 104 households, and 61 families residing in the CDP. The population density was 0.6 inhabitants per square mile (0.23/km^{2}). There were 260 housing units at an average density of 0.6 per square mile (0.23/km^{2}). The racial makeup of the CDP was 88.76% White, 0.40% Black or African American, 7.23% Native American, 0.40% Asian, and 3.21% from two or more races.

There were 104 households, out of which 26.0% had children under the age of 18 living with them, 51.0% were married couples living together, 4.8% had a female householder with no husband present, and 40.4% were non-families. 36.5% of all households were made up of individuals, and 9.6% had someone living alone who was 65 years of age or older. The average household size was 2.39 and the average family size was 3.11.

In the CDP, the population was spread out, with 26.5% under the age of 18, 2.4% from 18 to 24, 24.9% from 25 to 44, 34.9% from 45 to 64, and 11.2% who were 65 years of age or older. The median age was 43 years. For every 100 females, there were 122.3 males. For every 100 females age 18 and over, there were 125.9 males.

The median income for a household in the CDP was $36,429, and the median income for a family was $46,250. Males had a median income of $13,542 versus $36,250 for females. The per capita income for the CDP was $14,855. None of the families and 4.0% of the population were living below the poverty line.

== Sports and recreation ==
Skiing is a popular activity in the winter. The surrounding Chugach Mountains provide excellent back-country ski slopes. Majestic Heli Ski provides helicopter guided services during the winter months from the Majestic Valley Wilderness Lodge.

Hiking is available year-round on many trails. Some are within walking distance of the Glenn Highway while many others are a leisurely drive away.

The town hosts the Glacier View Car launch on the 4th of July. Cars are launched from the bluff to the beach below.
