= Anchorage metropolitan area =

Metropolitan area in the U.S. state of Alaska

Coordinates: 61.1620°N 149.2792°W

- Metropolitan Statistical Area
- Anchorage MSA
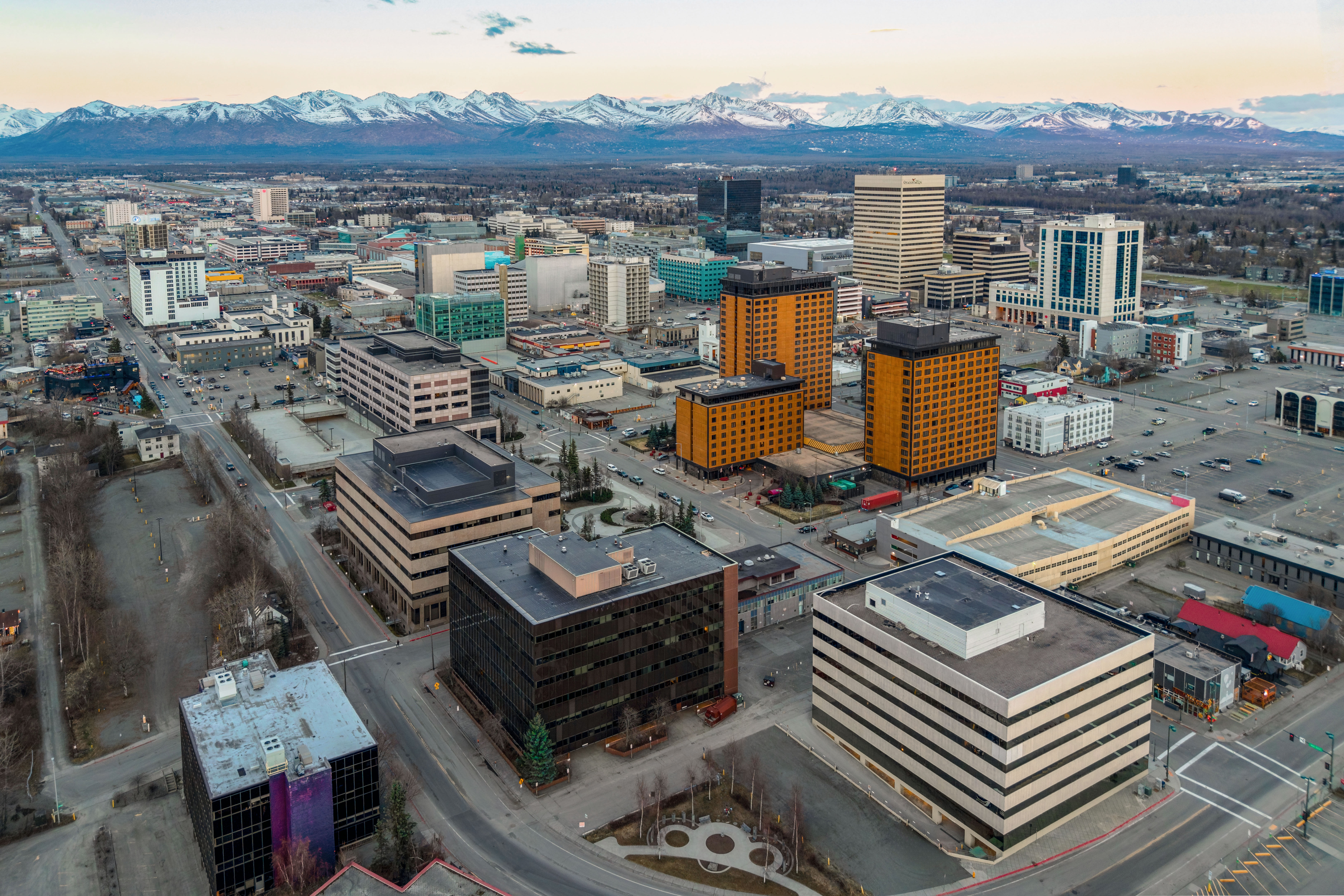
- Downtown Anchorage
Map of Anchorage, AK MSA
Anchorage Municipality
Matanuska-Susitna Borough
- Country: United States
- State: Alaska

Area
  - Metro: 27,205 sq mi (70,461 km^{2})

Population (2022)
  - Metro: 398,807

GDP
  - Metro: $34,065.381 (in millions of USD, 2023)
- Time zone: UTC−10 (AST)
  - Summer (DST): UTC−9 (ADT)

The Anchorage Metropolitan Statistical Area, as defined by the United States Census Bureau, is an area consisting of the Municipality of Anchorage and the Matanuska-Susitna Borough in the south central region of Alaska.

As of the 2010 census, the metropolitan statistical area (MSA) had a population of 380,821. However, 2016 population estimates increase that number to more than 400,000. This is a census definition only, and many of the settlements considered within the metropolitan area are in fact quite distant from the city center and may be very small and isolated, for example Lake Louise is about 170 miles (270 km) from Anchorage proper and has fewer than 50 year-round residents.

== Communities ==
Place with more than 100,000 inhabitants

- Anchorage (principal city)

Place with 10,000 to 25,000 inhabitants

- Eagle River
- Knik-Fairview

Places with 5,000 to 10,000 inhabitants

- Gateway
- Lakes
- Meadow Lakes
- Palmer
- Tanaina
- Wasilla

Places with 2,500 to 5,000 inhabitants

- Big Lake
- Butte
- Fishhook

Places with 1,000 to 2,500 inhabitants

- Farm Loop
- Houston
- Lazy Mountain
- Susitna North
- Sutton-Alpine
- Willow

Places with fewer than 1,000 inhabitants

- Buffalo Soapstone
- Chase
- Chickaloon
- Eureka Roadhouse
- Glacier View
- Knik River
- Lake Louise
- Petersville
- Point MacKenzie
- Skwentna
- Susitna (including Alexander Creek)
- Talkeetna
- Trapper Creek

== Demographics ==
As of the census of 2010, there were 380,821 people residing within the MSA. The racial makeup of the MSA was 75.08% White, 4.88% African American, 6.95% Native American (a category that also includes Alaska Natives), 4.65% Asian, 0.78% Pacific Islander, 1.94% from other races, and 5.72% from two or more races. Hispanics or Latinos of any race were 5.10% of the population.

The median income for a household in the MSA was $53,384, and the median income for a family was $60,311. Males had a median income of $43,287 versus $30,573 for females. The per capita income for the MSA was $23,196.

Borough or equivalent	Seat	2025 Estimate	2020 Census	Change	Land area	Density
Anchorage municipality	—	287,155	291,247	−1.40%	1,707 sq mi (4,420 km^{2})	168/sq mi (65/km^{2})
Matanuska-Susitna	Palmer	118,666	107,081	+10.82%	24,608 sq mi (63,730 km^{2})	5/sq mi (2/km^{2})
Total		405,821	398,328	+1.88%	26,315 sq mi (68,160 km^{2})	15/sq mi (6/km^{2})

== See also ==
- Alaska census statistical areas
