= Chase, Alaska =

- CDP
- Location in Matanuska-Susitna Borough and the state of Alaska

- Location within the state of Alaska
- Coordinates: 62°25′20″N 150°4′39″W
- Country: United States
- State: Alaska
- Borough: Matanuska-Susitna

Government
  - Borough mayor: Edna DeVries
  - State senator: Mike Shower (R)
  - State rep.: Kevin McCabe (R)

Area
  - Total: 169.46 sq mi (438.91 km^{2})
  - Land: 168.76 sq mi (437.08 km^{2})
  - Water: 0.71 sq mi (1.83 km^{2})
- Elevation: 545 ft (166 m)

Population (2020)
  - Total: 19
  - Density: 0.10/sq mi (0.04/km^{2})
- Time zone: UTC-9 (Alaska (AKST))
  - Summer (DST): UTC-8 (AKDT)
- Area code: 907
- FIPS code: 02-12350
- GNIS feature ID: 1866934

Chase is a census-designated place (CDP) in Matanuska-Susitna Borough, Alaska, United States. Located 9.2 miles north from Talkeetna, it is part of the Anchorage, Alaska Metropolitan Statistical Area. The population was 19 at the 2020 census, down from 34 in 2010.

== Geography ==
Chase is located at 62°25′20″N 150°4′39″W (62.422316, -150.077553).

According to the United States Census Bureau, the CDP has a total area of 93.5 square miles (242 km^{2}), of which, 92.9 square miles (241 km^{2}) of it is land and 0.6 square miles (1.6 km^{2}) of it 0.66% is water.

== Demographics ==
Historical population
Census	Pop.	Note	%±
1990	38		—
2000	41		7.9%
2010	34		−17.1%
2020	19		−44.1%
U.S. Decennial Census

Chase first appeared on the 1990 U.S. Census as a census-designated place (CDP).

As of the census of 2000, there were 41 people, 21 households, and 9 families residing in the CDP. The population density at that time was 0.4 per square mile (0.15/km^{2}). There were 90 housing units at an average density of 1 per square mile (0.39/km^{2}). The racial makeup of the CDP was 100.00% White.

There were 21 households, out of which 14.3% had children under the age of 18 living with them, 42.9% were married couples living together, 4.8% had a female householder with no husband present, and 52.4% were non-families. 42.9% of all households were made up of individuals, and 9.5% had someone living alone who was 65 years of age or older. The average household size was 1.95 and the average family size was 2.70.

In the CDP, the population was spread out, with 17.1% under the age of 18, 2.4% from 18 to 24, 17.1% from 25 to 44, 56.1% from 45 to 64, and 7.3% who were 65 years of age or older. The median age was 47 years. For every 100 females, there were 156.3 males. For every 100 females age 18 and over, there were 183.3 males.

The median income for a household in the CDP was $16,250, and the median income for a family was $0. Males had a median income of $0 versus $0 for females. The per capita income for the CDP was $16,000. There were no families and none of the population living below the poverty line, including no under eighteens and none of those over 64.
