= 2002 United States Senate election in Alaska =

- November 5, 2002
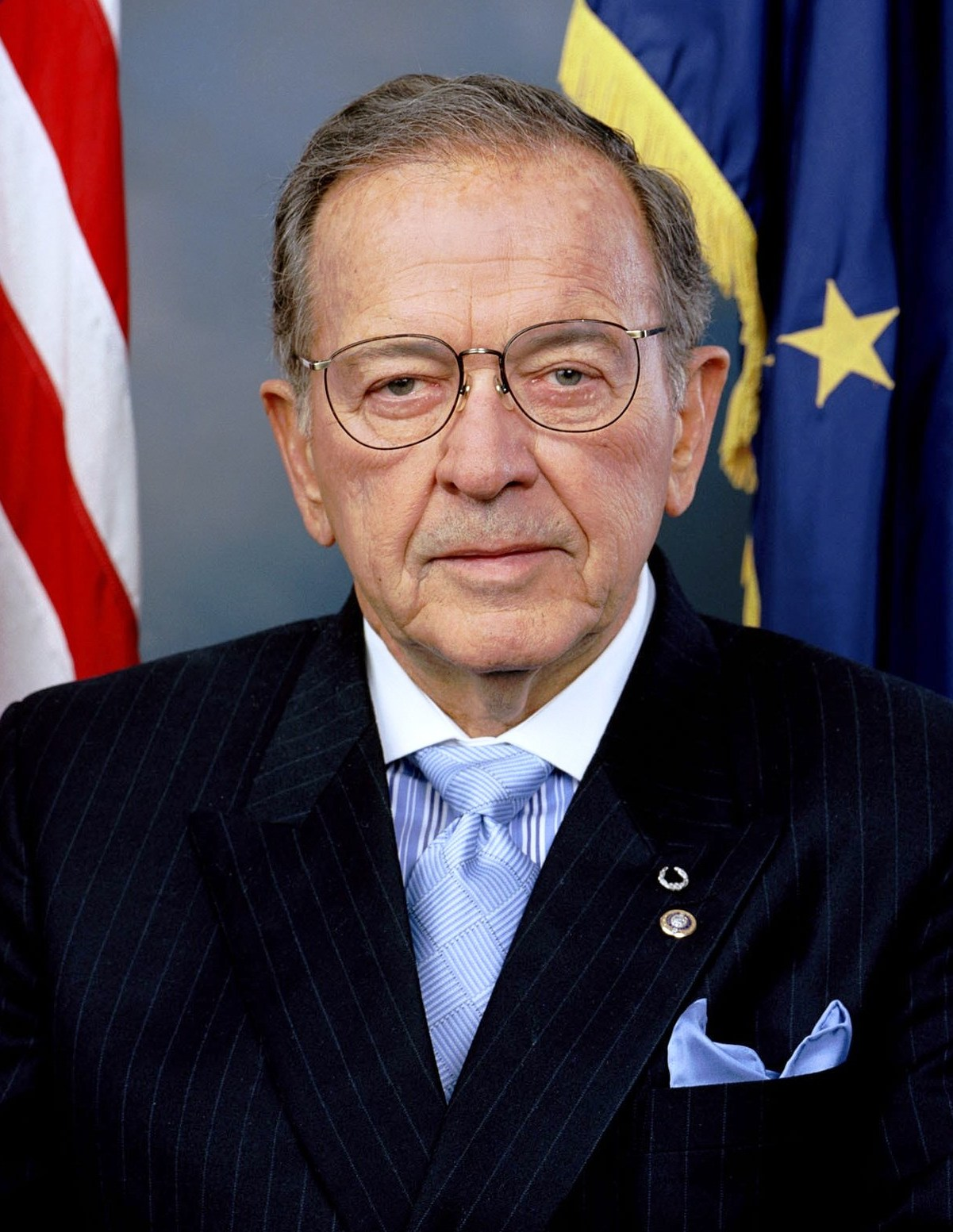

| Nominee | Ted Stevens | Frank Vondersaar | Jim Sykes |
| Party | Republican | Democratic | Green |
| Popular vote | 179,438 | 24,133 | 16,608 |
| Percentage | 78.17% | 10.51% | 7.24% |
- Stevens: 60–70% 70–80% 80–90% >90%
U.S. senator before election
Ted Stevens
Republican
Elected U.S. Senator
Ted Stevens
Republican

The 2002 United States Senate election in Alaska was held on November 5, 2002. Incumbent Republican United States Senator Ted Stevens ran for and won a seventh term (a sixth full term) and final term in the United States Senate. He faced perennial candidate Frank Vondersaar, the Democratic nominee, journalist Jim Sykes, the Green Party nominee, and several other independent candidates in his bid for re-election. Ultimately, Stevens defeated his opponents by an overwhelming margin to win what would be his last term in the Senate, the highest percentage of the vote of any of his elections. This would be the last Senate election in the state until 2020 in which the winning candidate received a majority of the vote.

On the same night, Frank Murkowski was elected as governor of Alaska. He would resign from Alaska's Class 3 U.S. Senate seat and then appoint his daughter, Lisa Murkowski, to fill the vacancy on December 20.

== Democratic primary ==
=== Candidates ===
- Frank Vondersaar, perennial candidate
- Theresa Obermeyer, former Anchorage School Board member and 1996 Democratic nominee for the United States Senate

=== Results ===
Democratic primary results
| Party | Candidate | Votes | % |
|---|---|---|---|
| Democratic | Frank Vondersaar | 18,256 | 66.27% |
| Democratic | Theresa Obermeyer | 9,292 | 33.73% |
| Total votes | | 27,548 | 100.00% |

== Republican primary ==
=== Candidates ===
- Ted Stevens, incumbent United States Senator since 1968
- Mike Aubrey, construction worker

=== Results ===
Republican primary results
| Party | Candidate | Votes | % |
|---|---|---|---|
| Republican | Ted Stevens (incumbent) | 64,315 | 88.94% |
| Republican | Mike Aubrey | 7,997 | 11.06% |
| Total votes | | 72,312 | 100.00% |

== Alaskan Independence Party primary ==
=== Candidates ===
- Jim Dore, conservative activist

=== Results ===
Alaskan Independence Party primary results
| Party | Candidate | Votes | % |
|---|---|---|---|
| Independence | Jim Dore | 2,665 | 100.00% |
| Total votes | | 2,665 | 100.00% |

== Green Party primary ==
=== Candidates ===
- Jim Sykes, journalist
- Thomas M. Higgins, theater technician

Green Party primary results
| Party | Candidate | Votes | % |
|---|---|---|---|
| Green | Jim Sykes | 1,182 | 76.65% |
| Green | Thomas M. Higgins | 360 | 23.35% |
| Total votes | | 1,542 | 100.00% |

== Libertarian Party primary ==
=== Candidates ===
- Leonard Karpinski

=== Results ===
Libertarian Party primary results
| Party | Candidate | Votes | % |
|---|---|---|---|
| Libertarian | Leonard Karpinski | 558 | 100.00% |
| Total votes | | 558 | 100.00% |

== General election ==
=== Predictions ===
| Source | Ranking | As of |
|---|---|---|
| Sabato's Crystal Ball | Safe R | November 4, 2002 |

=== Results ===
2002 United States Senate election in Alaska
| Party | Candidate | Votes | % | ±% |
|---|---|---|---|---|
| Republican | Ted Stevens (incumbent) | 179,438 | 78.17% | +1.46% |
| Democratic | Frank Vondersaar | 24,133 | 10.51% | +0.17% |
| Green | Jim Sykes | 16,608 | 7.24% | −5.29% |
| Independence | Jim Dore | 6,724 | 2.93% | |
| Libertarian | Leonard Karpinski | 2,354 | 1.03% | |
| Write-ins | | 291 | 0.13% | |
| Majority | | 155,305 | 67.66% | +3.47% |
| Turnout | | 229,548 | | |
| Republican hold | | Swing | | |

== See also ==
- 2002 United States Senate elections
