= Buffalo Soapstone, Alaska =

- CDP
- Location in Matanuska-Susitna Borough and the state of Alaska

- Location within the state of Alaska
- Coordinates: 61°41′25″N 149°7′27″W
- Country: United States
- State: Alaska
- Borough: Matanuska-Susitna

Government
  - Borough mayor: Edna DeVries
  - State senator: Mike Shower (R)
  - State rep.: George Rauscher (R)

Area
  - Total: 22.19 sq mi (57.47 km^{2})
  - Land: 22.14 sq mi (57.33 km^{2})
  - Water: 0.054 sq mi (0.14 km^{2})

Population (2020)
  - Total: 1,021
  - Density: 46.1/sq mi (17.81/km^{2})
- Time zone: UTC-9 (Alaska (AKST))
  - Summer (DST): UTC-8 (AKDT)
- Area code: 907
- FIPS code: 02-09657

Buffalo Soapstone is a census-designated place (CDP) in Matanuska-Susitna Borough, Alaska, United States. It is part of the Anchorage, Alaska Metropolitan Statistical Area. The population was 1,021 at the 2020 census, up from 855 in 2010.

== Geography ==
Buffalo Soapstone is located at 61°41′25″N 149°07′27″W.

According to the United States Census Bureau, the CDP has a total area of 22.6 square miles (59 km^{2}), of which, 22.6 square miles (59 km^{2}) of it is land and 0.04% is water.

== Demographics ==
Historical population
Census	Pop.	Note	%±
2000	699		—
2010	855		22.3%
2020	1,021		19.4%
U.S. Decennial Census

Buffalo Soapstone first appeared on the 2000 U.S. Census as a census-designated place (CDP).

=== 2020 census ===
As of the 2020 census, Buffalo Soapstone had a population of 1,021. The median age was 38.3 years. 24.5% of residents were under the age of 18 and 12.4% of residents were 65 years of age or older. For every 100 females there were 105.0 males, and for every 100 females age 18 and over there were 98.2 males age 18 and over.

0.0% of residents lived in urban areas, while 100.0% lived in rural areas.

There were 373 households in Buffalo Soapstone, of which 25.7% had children under the age of 18 living in them. Of all households, 54.7% were married-couple households, 17.7% were households with a male householder and no spouse or partner present, and 16.9% were households with a female householder and no spouse or partner present. About 24.4% of all households were made up of individuals and 10.2% had someone living alone who was 65 years of age or older.

There were 516 housing units, of which 27.7% were vacant. The homeowner vacancy rate was 3.9% and the rental vacancy rate was 53.7%.

Racial composition as of the 2020 census
Race	Number	Percent
White	835	81.8%
Black or African American	1	0.1%
American Indian and Alaska Native	42	4.1%
Asian	7	0.7%
Native Hawaiian and Other Pacific Islander	1	0.1%
Some other race	9	0.9%
Two or more races	126	12.3%
Hispanic or Latino (of any race)	25	2.4%

=== 2000 census ===
As of the census of 2000, there were 699 people, 233 households, and 171 families residing in the CDP. The population density was 31.0 inhabitants per square mile (12.0/km^{2}). There were 266 housing units at an average density of 11.8 per square mile (4.6/km^{2}). The racial makeup of the CDP was 89.70% White, 0.29% Black or African American, 4.43% Native American, 0.43% Asian, 1.14% from other races, and 4.01% from two or more races. 1.57% of the population were Hispanic or Latino of any race.

There were 233 households, out of which 45.9% had children under the age of 18 living with them, 57.9% were married couples living together, 6.4% had a female householder with no husband present, and 26.2% were non-families. 19.3% of all households were made up of individuals, and 1.7% had someone living alone who was 65 years of age or older. The average household size was 2.00 and the average family size was 3.20.

In the CDP, the population was spread out, with 33.8% under the age of 18, 7.9% from 18 to 24, 33.8% from 25 to 44, 21.7% from 45 to 64, and 2.9% who were 65 years of age or older. The median age was 33 years. For every 100 females, there were 117.8 males. For every 100 females age 18 and over, there were 122.6 males.

The median income for a household in the CDP was $41,264, and the median income for a family was $40,678.09. Males had a median income of $45,208 versus $26,167 for females. The per capita income for the CDP was $18,021. About 22.8% of families and 22.2% of the population were below the poverty line, including 31.4% of those under age 18 and 14.3% of those age 65 or over.
