= Lake Louise, Alaska =

Lake Louise Sasnuu’ Bene’
- Census-designated place
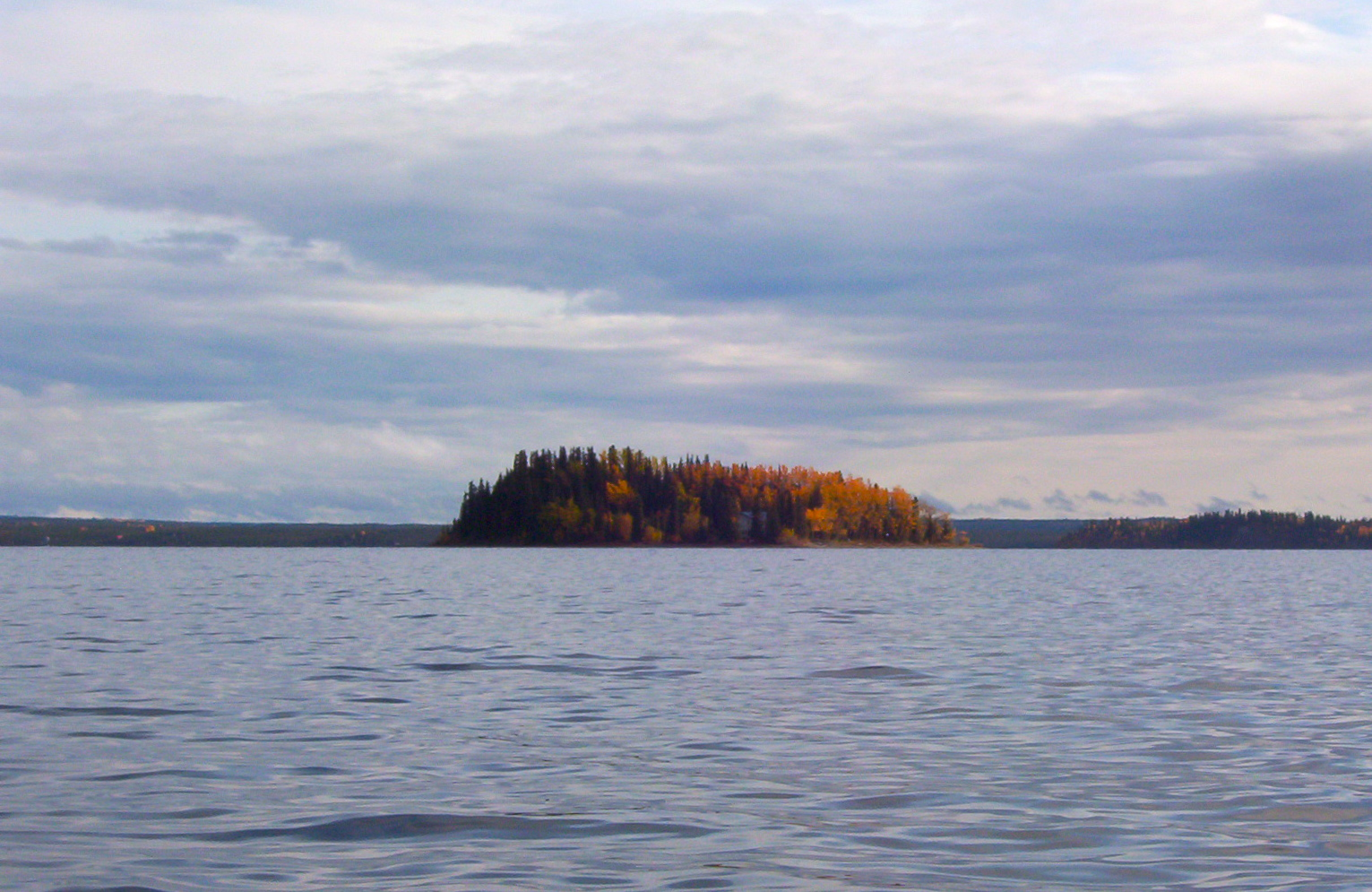

- Location in Matanuska-Susitna Borough and the state of Alaska

- Location within the state of Alaska
- Coordinates: 62°17′4″N 146°33′25″W
- Country: United States
- State: Alaska
- Borough: Matanuska-Susitna

Government
  - Borough mayor: Edna DeVries
  - State senator: Mike Shower (R)
  - State rep.: George Rauscher (R)

Area
  - Total: 97.72 sq mi (253.09 km^{2})
  - Land: 55.74 sq mi (144.37 km^{2})
  - Water: 41.98 sq mi (108.72 km^{2})
- Elevation: 2,448 ft (746 m)

Population (2020)
  - Total: 15
  - Density: 0.26/sq mi (0.1/km^{2})
- Time zone: UTC-9 (Alaska (AKST))
  - Summer (DST): UTC-8 (AKDT)
- Area code: 907
- FIPS code: 02-42805
- GNIS feature ID: 1865556

Lake Louise (Sasnuu’ Bene’ in Ahtna) is a census-designated place (CDP) in Matanuska-Susitna Borough, Alaska, United States. Although it is an isolated settlement and is close to Glennallen, it is considered part of the Anchorage Metropolitan Area, like all other locations in the Mat-Su Borough. At the 2020 census the population was 15, down from 46 in 2010 and 88 in 2000.

The first recorded name of Lake Louise was Shosubenich, which means "great flat water with many islands". When Lieutenant Joseph Castner first arrived at the lake on August 6th 1898, he named it "Lake Adah" after a pretty girl he knew. However, when Captain Edwin Glenn arrived sometime later, he convinced Castner to change the name to "Lake Louise" in honor of his wife. The U.S. Army established a recreation facility at the lake towards the end of World War II and built the first road into the area. Lake Louise Road runs about 20 miles (32 km) from the Glenn Highway to the lake. There are still several dilapidated cabins at the "Army Point" campground, including one that was used for four days by General Dwight D. Eisenhower before he was president. The lake is home to the Lake Louise State Recreation Area.

== Geography ==
Lake Louise is located along the eastern edge of Matanuska-Susitna Borough at 62°17′4″N 146°33′25″W (62.284498, -146.557029). Lake Louise is located between four mountain ranges: the Wrangell, Talkeetna, Chugach and Alaska ranges.

According to the United States Census Bureau, the Lake Louise CDP has a total area of 97.7 square miles (253 km^{2}), of which 55.7 square miles (144 km^{2}) are land and 42.0 square miles (109 km^{2}), or 42.96%, are water. There are many small islands at the south end of the lake, most of which have homes built on them. There are also several private resorts and marinas, and a state recreation area with campgrounds and a boat launch.

=== Climate ===
Lake Susitna, 2375 ft (724 m), is a weather station located approximately 15 miles (24.1 km) to the north of Lake Louise.

Climate data for Lake Susitna, 1991–2020 normals, 1990–2003 extremes: 2375ft (724m)
Month	Jan	Feb	Mar	Apr	May	Jun	Jul	Aug	Sep	Oct	Nov	Dec	Year
Record high °F (°C)	37 (3)	42 (6)	51 (11)	65 (18)	76 (24)	85 (29)	84 (29)	87 (31)	70 (21)	58 (14)	44 (7)	38 (3)	87 (31)
Mean maximum °F (°C)	29.2 (−1.6)	35.0 (1.7)	41.4 (5.2)	54.4 (12.4)	68.3 (20.2)	78.6 (25.9)	79.0 (26.1)	72.7 (22.6)	63.4 (17.4)	48.5 (9.2)	33.3 (0.7)	28.5 (−1.9)	81.1 (27.3)
Mean daily maximum °F (°C)	4.8 (−15.1)	16.4 (−8.7)	27.0 (−2.8)	42.5 (5.8)	55.7 (13.2)	66.2 (19.0)	68.8 (20.4)	63.1 (17.3)	52.8 (11.6)	35.0 (1.7)	15.8 (−9.0)	5.0 (−15.0)	37.8 (3.2)
Daily mean °F (°C)	−5.1 (−20.6)	3.5 (−15.8)	10.4 (−12.0)	27.6 (−2.4)	43.0 (6.1)	54.3 (12.4)	57.7 (14.3)	52.8 (11.6)	43.1 (6.2)	26.6 (−3.0)	6.0 (−14.4)	−3.8 (−19.9)	26.3 (−3.1)
Mean daily minimum °F (°C)	−15.0 (−26.1)	−9.5 (−23.1)	−6.1 (−21.2)	12.7 (−10.7)	30.4 (−0.9)	42.5 (5.8)	46.5 (8.1)	42.4 (5.8)	33.3 (0.7)	18.2 (−7.7)	−3.9 (−19.9)	−12.7 (−24.8)	14.9 (−9.5)
Mean minimum °F (°C)	−42.2 (−41.2)	−37.0 (−38.3)	−32.6 (−35.9)	−13.2 (−25.1)	14.9 (−9.5)	31.4 (−0.3)	36.8 (2.7)	29.2 (−1.6)	17.5 (−8.1)	−6.4 (−21.3)	−27.3 (−32.9)	−38.3 (−39.1)	−48.1 (−44.5)
Record low °F (°C)	−53 (−47)	−54 (−48)	−43 (−42)	−29 (−34)	8 (−13)	26 (−3)	29 (−2)	21 (−6)	−2 (−19)	−25 (−32)	−50 (−46)	−53 (−47)	−54 (−48)
Average precipitation inches (mm)	0.47 (12)	0.55 (14)	0.37 (9.4)	0.16 (4.1)	0.73 (19)	1.82 (46)	2.38 (60)	1.78 (45)	1.28 (33)	0.98 (25)	0.61 (15)	0.63 (16)	11.76 (298.5)
Average snowfall inches (cm)	7.60 (19.3)	6.70 (17.0)	4.70 (11.9)	2.60 (6.6)	2.60 (6.6)	0.00 (0.00)	0.00 (0.00)	0.00 (0.00)	2.70 (6.9)	9.70 (24.6)	8.50 (21.6)	9.40 (23.9)	54.5 (138.4)
Source 1: NOAA
Source 2: XMACIS2 (records & monthly max/mins)

== Demographics ==
Historical population
Census	Pop.	Note	%±
2000	88		—
2010	46		−47.7%
2020	15		−67.4%
U.S. Decennial Census

Lake Louise first appeared on the 2000 U.S. Census as a census-designated place (CDP).

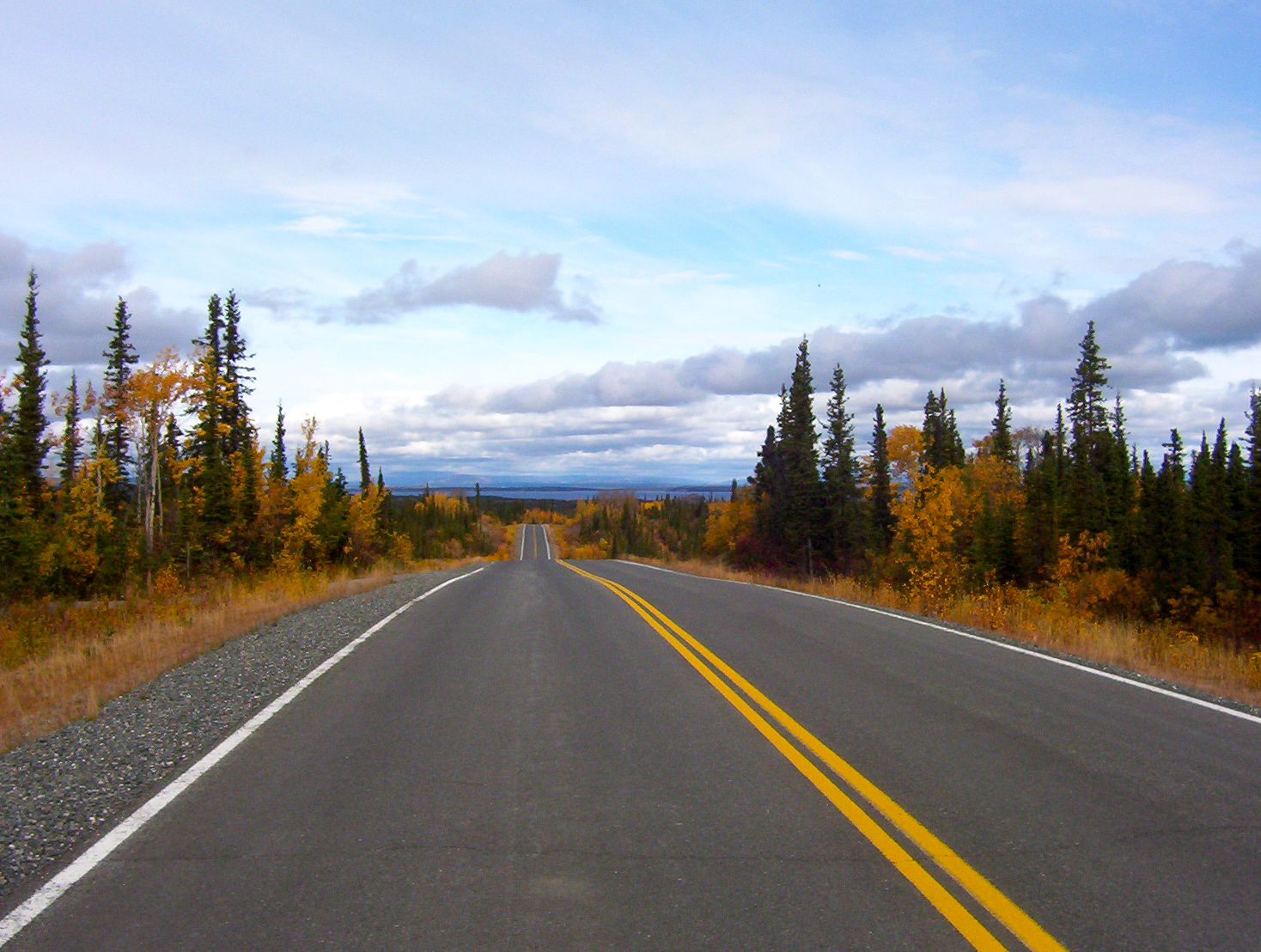
Lake Louise from a distance of about 5 miles (8.0 km)

As of the census of 2000, there were 88 people, 41 households, and 25 families residing in the CDP. The population density was 1.8 inhabitants per square mile (0.69/km^{2}). There were 255 housing units at an average density of 5.3 per square mile (2.0/km^{2}). The racial makeup of the CDP was 89.77% White and 10.23% Native American.

There were 41 households, out of which 17.1% had children under the age of 18 living with them, 58.5% were married couples living together, 2.4% had a female householder with no husband present, and 39.0% were non-families. 24.4% of all households were made up of individuals, and 2.4% had someone living alone who was 65 years of age or older. The average household size was 2.15 and the average family size was 2.64.

In the CDP, the population was spread out, with 17.0% under the age of 18, 1.1% from 18 to 24, 27.3% from 25 to 44, 46.6% from 45 to 64, and 8.0% who were 65 years of age or older. The median age was 47 years. For every 100 females, there were 114.6 males. For every 100 females age 18 and over, there were 135.5 males.

The median income for a household in the CDP was $5,000, and the median income for a family was $43,750. Males had a median income of $3,750 versus $0 for females. The per capita income for the CDP was $11,057. There were no families and 56.7% of the population living below the poverty line, including no under eighteens and none of those over 64.

== Recreation area ==
The Lake Louise State Recreation Area has a large campground, boat launch, and picnic areas, as well as a trail leading to the hilltop where the Army's original recreation area's cabins still stand, although in a state of severe disrepair. Visitors can expect to see a wide variety of wildlife, including the only known freshwater nesting site for cormorants, located on Bird Island. In the fall the Nelchina caribou herd passes through this area. The fishing in the lake is considered excellent, with a variety of freshwater fish, including lake trout and burbot.
