= Farm Loop, Alaska =

- CDP
- Location in Matanuska-Susitna Borough and the state of Alaska

- Location within the state of Alaska
- Coordinates: 61°37′42″N 149°8′44″W
- Country: United States
- State: Alaska
- Borough: Matanuska-Susitna

Government
  - Borough mayor: Edna DeVries
  - State senators: Shelley Hughes (R); Mike Shower (R)
  - State reps.: DeLena Johnson (R); George Rauscher (R)

Area
  - Total: 9.20 sq mi (23.84 km^{2})
  - Land: 9.11 sq mi (23.59 km^{2})
  - Water: 0.097 sq mi (0.25 km^{2})

Population (2020)
  - Total: 2,747
  - Density: 301.7/sq mi (116.47/km^{2})
- Time zone: UTC-9 (Alaska (AKST))
  - Summer (DST): UTC-8 (AKDT)
- ZIP code: 99645
- Area code: 907
- FIPS code: 02-25000

Farm Loop is a census-designated place (CDP) in Matanuska-Susitna Borough, Alaska, United States. It is part of the Anchorage, Alaska Metropolitan Statistical Area. At the 2020 census the population was 2,747, up from 1,028 in 2010.

== Geography ==
Farm Loop is located at 61°37′42″N 149°8′44″W (61.628426, -149.145602).

According to the United States Census Bureau, the CDP has a total area of 8.9 square miles (23 km^{2}), of which, 8.8 square miles (23 km^{2}) of it is land and 0.11% is water.

== Demographics ==
Historical population
Census	Pop.	Note	%±
2000	1,067		—
2010	1,028		−3.7%
2020	2,747		167.2%
U.S. Decennial Census

Farm Loop first appeared on the 2000 U.S. Census as a census-designated place (CDP).

=== 2020 census ===
As of the 2020 census, Farm Loop had a population of 2,747. The median age was 37.6 years. 28.8% of residents were under the age of 18 and 12.7% of residents were 65 years of age or older. For every 100 females there were 107.3 males, and for every 100 females age 18 and over there were 106.9 males age 18 and over.

13.7% of residents lived in urban areas, while 86.3% lived in rural areas.

There were 911 households in Farm Loop, of which 38.7% had children under the age of 18 living in them. Of all households, 68.4% were married-couple households, 12.2% were households with a male householder and no spouse or partner present, and 14.5% were households with a female householder and no spouse or partner present. About 15.1% of all households were made up of individuals and 4.3% had someone living alone who was 65 years of age or older.

There were 1,023 housing units, of which 10.9% were vacant. The homeowner vacancy rate was 0.4% and the rental vacancy rate was 13.3%.

Racial composition as of the 2020 census
Race	Number	Percent
White	2,220	80.8%
Black or African American	25	0.9%
American Indian and Alaska Native	124	4.5%
Asian	36	1.3%
Native Hawaiian and Other Pacific Islander	14	0.5%
Some other race	22	0.8%
Two or more races	306	11.1%
Hispanic or Latino (of any race)	143	5.2%

=== 2000 census ===
As of the census of 2000, there were 1,067 people, 334 households, and 268 families residing in the CDP. The population density was 120.7 inhabitants per square mile (46.6/km^{2}). There were 350 housing units at an average density of 39.6 per square mile (15.3/km^{2}). The racial makeup of the CDP was 93.0% White, 0.3% Black or African American, 3.4% Native American, 0.3% Asian, 0.1% Pacific Islander, 0.2% from other races, and 2.8% from two or more races. 2.4% of the population were Hispanic or Latino of any race.

There were 334 households, out of which 47.0% had children under the age of 18 living with them, 67.1% were married couples living together, 8.4% had a female householder with no husband present, and 19.5% were non-families. 14.1% of all households were made up of individuals, and 2.7% had someone living alone who was 65 years of age or older. The average household size was 3.19 and the average family size was 3.55.

In the CDP, the population was spread out, with 36.2% under the age of 18, 6.6% from 18 to 24, 27.9% from 25 to 44, 24.4% from 45 to 64, and 5.0% who were 65 years of age or older. The median age was 34 years. For every 100 females, there were 104.4 males. For every 100 females age 18 and over, there were 95.1 males.

The median income for a household in the CDP was $55,234, and the median income for a family was $56,953. Males had a median income of $44,417 versus $31,705 for females. The per capita income for the CDP was $20,880. About 6.1% of families and 7.2% of the population were below the poverty line, including 6.6% of those under age 18 and none of those age 65 or over.
