= Fishhook, Alaska =

- CDP
- Location in Matanuska-Susitna Borough and the state of Alaska

- Location within the state of Alaska
- Coordinates: 61°40′38″N 149°15′54″W
- Country: United States
- State: Alaska
- Borough: Matanuska-Susitna

Government
  - Borough mayor: Edna DeVries
  - State senator: Mike Shower (R)
  - State rep.: George Rauscher (R)

Area
  - Total: 65.56 sq mi (169.80 km^{2})
  - Land: 65.09 sq mi (168.57 km^{2})
  - Water: 0.47 sq mi (1.23 km^{2})

Population (2020)
  - Total: 5,048
  - Density: 77.6/sq mi (29.95/km^{2})
- Time zone: UTC-9 (Alaska (AKST))
  - Summer (DST): UTC-8 (AKDT)
- Area code: 907
- FIPS code: 02-25550

Fishhook is a census-designated place (CDP) in Matanuska-Susitna Borough, Alaska, United States. It is part of the Anchorage, Alaska Metropolitan Statistical Area. At the 2020 census the population was 5,048, up from 4,679 in 2010.

== Geography ==
Fishhook is located at 61°40′38″N 149°15′54″W (61.677320, -149.265043).

According to the United States Census Bureau, the CDP has a total area of 88.4 square miles (229 km^{2}), of which, 88.1 square miles (228 km^{2}) of it is land and 0.3 square miles (0.78 km^{2}) of it (0.33%) is water. It could be characterized as slightly more rural than suburban. It contains a number of mid-sized to small lakes and the Little Susitna River. In general, it is accessed by Wasilla-Fishhook Road.

== Demographics ==
Historical population
Census	Pop.	Note	%±
2000	2,030		—
2010	4,679		130.5%
2020	5,048		7.9%
U.S. Decennial Census

Fishhook first appeared on the 2000 U.S. Census as a census-designated place (CDP). It is not to be confused with an earlier community of the same name, which is now Chalkyitsik.

=== 2020 census ===
As of the 2020 census, Fishhook had a population of 5,048. The median age was 35.8 years. 30.6% of residents were under the age of 18 and 11.1% of residents were 65 years of age or older. For every 100 females there were 109.3 males, and for every 100 females age 18 and over there were 105.6 males age 18 and over.

6.2% of residents lived in urban areas, while 93.8% lived in rural areas.

There were 1,706 households in Fishhook, of which 42.1% had children under the age of 18 living in them. Of all households, 68.2% were married-couple households, 14.2% were households with a male householder and no spouse or partner present, and 12.7% were households with a female householder and no spouse or partner present. About 16.4% of all households were made up of individuals and 5.4% had someone living alone who was 65 years of age or older.

There were 1,943 housing units, of which 12.2% were vacant. The homeowner vacancy rate was 1.4% and the rental vacancy rate was 9.1%.

Racial composition as of the 2020 census
Race	Number	Percent
White	4,122	81.7%
Black or African American	39	0.8%
American Indian and Alaska Native	200	4.0%
Asian	62	1.2%
Native Hawaiian and Other Pacific Islander	13	0.3%
Some other race	84	1.7%
Two or more races	528	10.5%
Hispanic or Latino (of any race)	226	4.5%

=== 2000 census ===
As of the census of 2000, there were 2,030 people, 663 households, and 509 families residing in the CDP. The population density was 23.0 inhabitants per square mile (8.9/km^{2}). There were 730 housing units at an average density of 8.3 per square mile (3.2/km^{2}). The racial makeup of the CDP was 91.4% White, 0.4% Black or African American, 3.6% Native American, 0.8% Asian, 0.2% Pacific Islander, 0.7% from other races, and 3.0% from two or more races. 1.7% of the population were Hispanic or Latino of any race.

There were 663 households, out of which 45.4% had children under the age of 18 living with them, 64.1% were married couples living together, 6.2% had a female householder with no husband present, and 23.2% were non-families. 17.0% of all households were made up of individuals, and 2.6% had someone living alone who was 65 years of age or older. The average household size was 3.04 and the average family size was 3.44.

In the CDP, the population was spread out, with 34.0% under the age of 18, 8.1% from 18 to 24, 32.7% from 25 to 44, 21.5% from 45 to 64, and 3.7% who were 65 years of age or older. The median age was 33 years. For every 100 females, there were 108.6 males. For every 100 females age 18 and over, there were 114.4 males.

The median income for a household in the CDP was $55,179, and the median income for a family was $57,857. Males had a median income of $46,417 versus $25,865 for females. The per capita income for the CDP was $20,042. About 7.3% of families and 8.5% of the population were below the poverty line, including 9.1% of those under age 18 and 14.0% of those age 65 or over.
