= Matanuska-Susitna Borough, Alaska =

Borough in Alaska, United States

- Borough
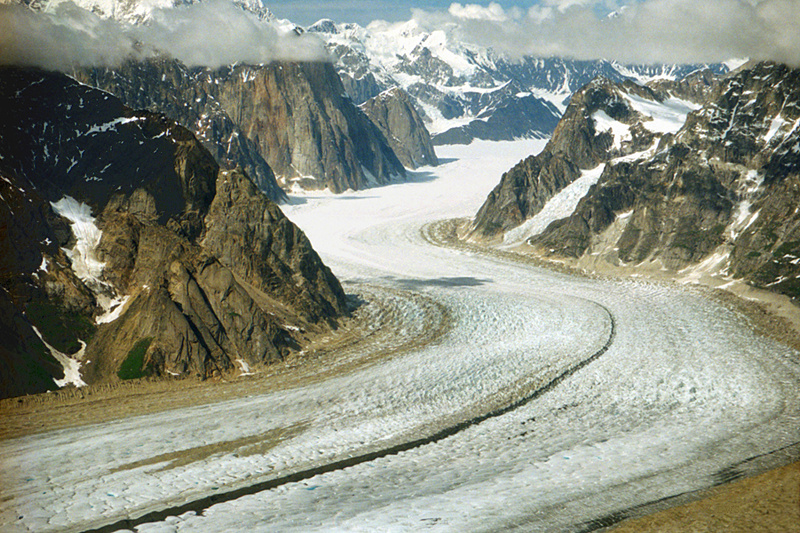
- Ruth Glacier

- Flag Seal

- Location within the U.S. state of Alaska
- Coordinates: 62°24′N 149°35′W
- Country: United States
- State: Alaska
- Incorporated: January 1, 1964
- Named for: Matanuska River and Susitna River
- Seat: Palmer
- Largest CDP: Knik-Fairview

Government
  - Borough Mayor: Edna DeVries

Area
  - Total: 25,258 sq mi (65,420 km^{2})
  - Land: 24,608 sq mi (63,730 km^{2})
  - Water: 650 sq mi (1,700 km^{2}) 2.6%

Population (2020)
  - Total: 107,081
  - Estimate (2025): 118,666 ▲
  - Density: 4.3515/sq mi (1.6801/km^{2})
- Time zone: UTC−9 (Alaska)
  - Summer (DST): UTC−8 (ADT)
- Congressional district: At-large
- Website: www.matsu.gov

Matanuska-Susitna Borough (often referred to as the Mat-Su Borough) is a borough located in the U.S. state of Alaska. Its borough seat is Palmer, and the largest incorporated community is Wasilla. As of the 2020 census, the borough's population was 107,081.

The borough is part of the Anchorage Metropolitan Statistical Area, along with the municipality of Anchorage on its south.

The Mat-Su Borough is designated as so because it contains the entire Matanuska and Susitna Rivers. They empty into Cook Inlet, which is the southern border of the Mat-Su Borough. It is one of the few agricultural areas in Alaska.

== Geography ==
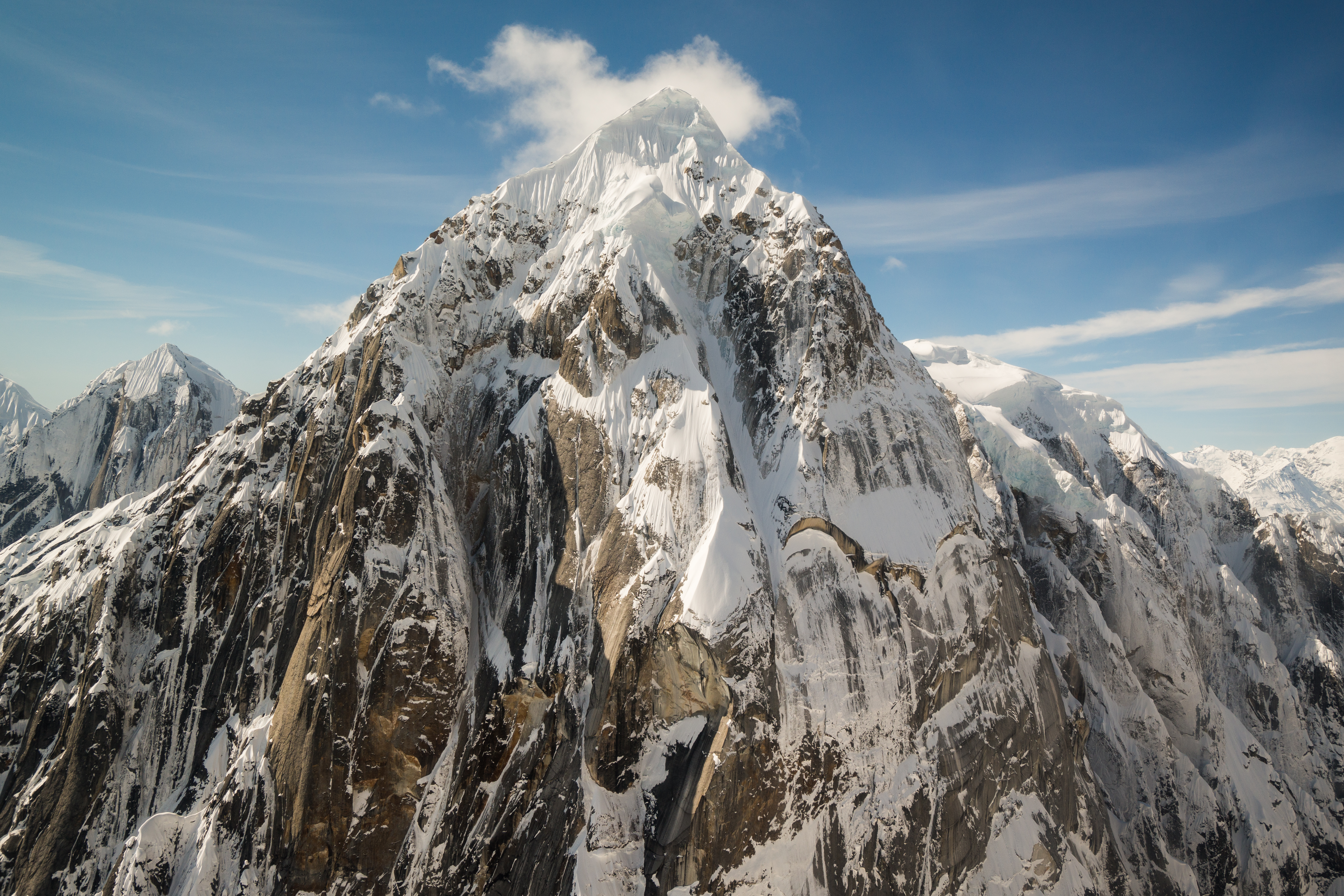
Mount Bradley in Matanuska-Susitna Borough, Alaska, 2014

As of the 2020 census, the population was 107,081, up from 88,995 in 2010. It is the fastest growing subdivision in Alaska.

According to the United States Census Bureau, the borough has a total area of 25,258 square miles (65,420 km^{2}), of which 24,608 square miles (63,730 km^{2}) is land and 650 square miles (1,700 km^{2}) (2.6%) is water.

=== Adjacent boroughs and census areas ===
- Denali Borough, Alaska - north
- Southeast Fairbanks Census Area, Alaska - northeast
- Copper River Census Area, Alaska - east
- Chugach Census Area, Alaska - south
- Municipality of Anchorage, Alaska - south
- Kenai Peninsula Borough, Alaska - south
- Bethel Census Area, Alaska - west
- Yukon–Koyukuk Census Area, Alaska - west

=== National protected areas in the borough ===
- Chugach National Forest (part)
- Denali National Park and Preserve (part)
  - Denali Wilderness (part)
- Lake Clark National Park and Preserve (part)
  - Lake Clark Wilderness (part)

== Demographics ==
Historical population
Census	Pop.	Note	%±
1960	5,188		—
1970	6,509		25.5%
1980	17,816		173.7%
1990	39,683		122.7%
2000	59,322		49.5%
2010	88,995		50.0%
2020	107,081		20.3%
2025 (est.)	118,666	▲	10.8%
U.S. Decennial Census; 1790–1960 1900–1990; 1990–2000 2010–2020

=== 2020 census ===
Matanuska-Susitna Borough, Alaska – Racial and ethnic composition Note: the US Census treats Hispanic/Latino as an ethnic category. This table excludes Latinos from the racial categories and assigns them to a separate category. Hispanics/Latinos may be of any race.
Race / Ethnicity (NH = Non-Hispanic)	Pop 2000	Pop 2010	Pop 2020	% 2000	% 2010	% 2020
White alone (NH)	51,175	73,676	81,050	86.27%	82.79%	75.69%
Black or African American alone (NH)	398	817	1,059	0.67%	0.92%	0.99%
Native American or Alaska Native alone (NH)	3,168	4,735	6,531	5.34%	5.32%	6.10%
Asian alone (NH)	401	1,075	1,515	0.68%	1.21%	1.41%
Native Hawaiian or Pacific Islander alone (NH)	66	214	476	0.11%	0.24%	0.44%
Other race alone (NH)	162	121	785	0.27%	0.14%	0.73%
Mixed race or Multiracial (NH)	2,467	5,056	10,421	4.16%	5.68%	9.73%
Hispanic or Latino (any race)	1,485	3,301	5,244	2.50%	3.71%	4.90%
Total	59,322	88,995	107,081	100.00%	100.00%	100.00%

As of the 2020 census, the borough had a population of 107,081. The median age was 36.3 years. 27.1% of residents were under the age of 18 and 13.3% of residents were 65 years of age or older. For every 100 females there were 107.1 males, and for every 100 females age 18 and over there were 106.8 males age 18 and over.

The racial makeup of the borough was 77.5% White, 1.0% Black or African American, 6.4% American Indian and Alaska Native, 1.5% Asian, 0.5% Native Hawaiian and Pacific Islander, 1.6% from some other race, and 11.5% from two or more races. Hispanic or Latino residents of any race comprised 4.9% of the population.

49.9% of residents lived in urban areas, while 50.1% lived in rural areas.

There were 38,380 households in the borough, of which 35.4% had children under the age of 18 living with them and 19.2% had a female householder with no spouse or partner present. About 23.2% of all households were made up of individuals and 8.3% had someone living alone who was 65 years of age or older.

There were 51,077 housing units, of which 24.9% were vacant. Among occupied housing units, 75.6% were owner-occupied and 24.4% were renter-occupied. The homeowner vacancy rate was 2.3% and the rental vacancy rate was 10.0%.

=== 2000 census ===
As of the 2000 census, there were 59,322 people, 20,556 households, and 15,046 families residing in the borough. The population density was 2 people per square mile (0.77 people/km^{2}). There were 27,329 housing units at an average density of 1 per square mile (0.39/km^{2}). The racial makeup of the borough was 87.55% White, 0.69% Black or African American, 5.50% Native American, 0.70% Asian, 0.12% Pacific Islander, 0.86% from other races, and 4.57% from two or more races. 2.50% of the population were Hispanic or Latino of any race.

There were 20,556 households, out of which 42.30% had children under the age of 18 living with them, 58.90% were married couples living together, 9.10% had a female householder with no husband present, and 26.80% were non-families. 20.30% of all households were made up of individuals, and 4.10% had someone living alone who was 65 years of age or older. The average household size was 2.84 and the average family size was 3.29.

In the borough the population was spread out, with 32.20% under the age of 18, 7.40% from 18 to 24, 31.10% from 25 to 44, 23.40% from 45 to 64, and 5.90% who were 65 years of age or older. The median age was 34 years. For every 100 females, there were 108.20 males. For every 100 females age 18 and over, there were 108.10 males.

Schools in the borough are administered by the Matanuska-Susitna Borough School District.

== Politics and government ==
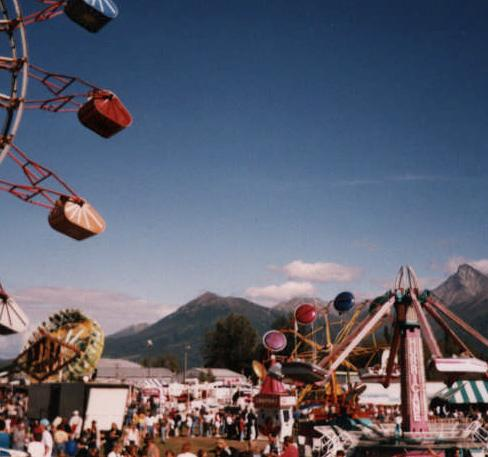
The midway area of the Alaska State Fair, held annually in Palmer during late August and early September

United States presidential election results for Matanuska-Susitna Borough, Alaska
Year	Republican		Democratic		Third party(ies)	
Year	No.	%	No.	%	No.	%
1960	1,152	52.20%	1,055	47.80%	0	0.00%
1964	964	43.72%	1,241	56.28%	0	0.00%
1968	1,076	46.42%	892	38.48%	350	15.10%
1972	2,004	66.62%	694	23.07%	310	10.31%
1976	2,884	60.70%	1,485	31.26%	382	8.04%
1980	5,012	61.36%	1,316	16.11%	1,840	22.53%
1984	9,944	73.69%	2,940	21.79%	610	4.52%
1988	8,856	65.01%	4,172	30.63%	594	4.36%
1992	7,564	39.13%	4,379	22.66%	7,385	38.21%
1996	11,306	59.81%	4,522	23.92%	3,074	16.26%
2000	17,976	69.31%	5,379	20.74%	2,579	9.94%
2004	17,569	72.71%	6,201	25.66%	394	1.63%
2008	30,246	74.50%	9,297	22.90%	1,056	2.60%
2012	27,339	72.68%	9,317	24.77%	959	2.55%
2016	31,947	74.39%	8,598	20.02%	2,398	5.58%
2020	38,492	71.90%	12,849	24.00%	2,195	4.10%
2024	40,140	72.50%	13,343	24.10%	1,882	3.40%

Republicans have carried the Matanuska-Susitna borough in every election except for 1964. Though the borough has aligned with the statewide presidential election winner in Alaska in every election since statehood, it has come to stand out as one of the most Republican areas in Alaska, alongside the neighboring, less populated Southeast Fairbanks Census Area. In 2020, around 20% of Donald Trump's vote share in the state came from this borough alone. Downballot, Matanuska-Susitna Borough has voted for Republican governors all but a handful of times.

Edna DeVries is the mayor of the Matanuska-Susitna Borough. The borough has a strong-manager form of government. Mike Brown is the borough manager. Long-time Manager John Duffy retired in 2010.

Sarah Palin was previously the mayor of Wasilla, the largest city in the borough.

== Communities ==
=== Cities ===
- Houston
- Palmer (Borough seat)
- Wasilla

=== Census-designated places ===
- Big Lake
- Buffalo Soapstone
- Butte
- Chase
- Chickaloon
- Eureka Roadhouse
- Farm Loop
- Fishhook
- Gateway
- Glacier View
- Knik River
- Knik-Fairview
- Lake Louise
- Lazy Mountain
- Meadow Lakes
- North Lakes
- Petersville
- Point MacKenzie
- Skwentna
- South Lakes
- Susitna
- Susitna North
- Sutton-Alpine
- Talkeetna
- Tanaina
- Trapper Creek
- Willow

=== Unincorporated community ===
- Alexander Creek

=== Census Subareas ===
- Matanuska-Susitna

== Cyber attack ==
In July 2018, the borough's computer systems, including the library and animal shelter, were hit by a ransomware attack, forcing employees to do without computers, instead using electric typewriters where available. The borough declared a state of emergency and incurred over $2 million in costs. The method is thought to have been a targeted phishing e-mail; data left by the malware indicated the borough was the 210th target attacked.

== Education ==
The school district is Matanuska-Susitna Borough School District.

== Gallery ==
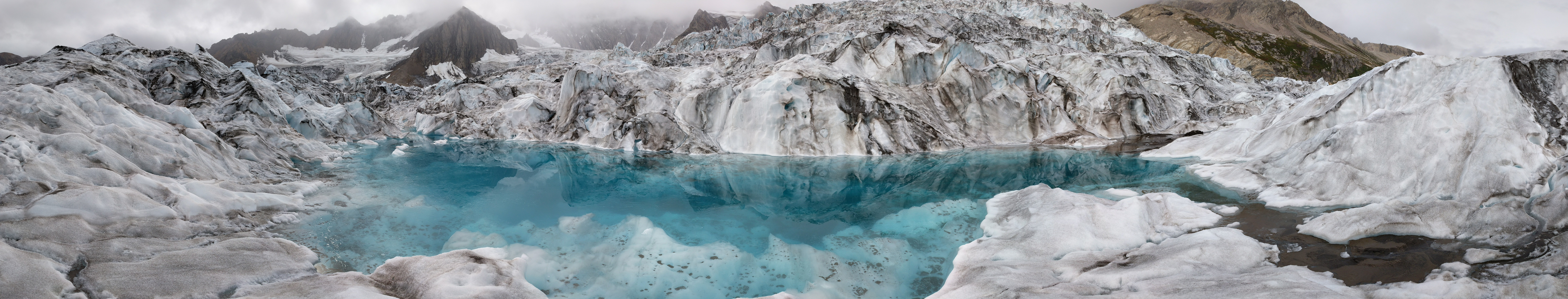
A freshwater pond on Trimble Glacier, in the Tordrillo Mountains, in the far south-west of Mat-Su Borough

== See also ==
- Matanuska-Susitna Valley
- List of Airports in the Matanuska-Susitna Borough
- Matanuska Formation
- Deshka Landing Fire
