= Edna DeVries =

American politician

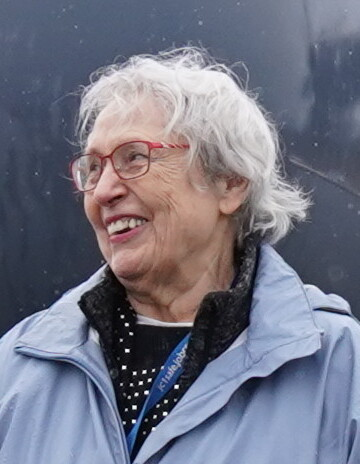
- DeVries in 2021

Mayor of Matanuska-Susitna Borough
- Incumbent
- Assumed office January 1, 2021
- In office January 1, 1982 – January 1, 1985

Member of the Alaska Senate
- In office January 22, 1985 – January 22, 1987

Republican National Committeewoman from Alaska
- In office January 20, 1992 – January 20, 2000

Personal details
- Born: July 12, 1941 (age 85) Wisconsin, U.S.
- Party: Republican
- Children: 4
- Education: University of Alaska, Anchorage (BBA); University of Alaska, Southeast

Edna B. DeVries (born July 12, 1941) is an American realtor and politician from Alaska, who has been mayor of Matanuska-Susitna Borough since November 2021. DeVries served in the Alaska Senate from 1984 to 1988. She previously served as mayor of Palmer, Alaska from December 2016 to November 2021, preceded by Vern Halter and succeeded by Steve Carrington, and was a member of its city council from 2010 to 2016 and 1996 to 1999. She was a candidate in the 2026 Alaska gubernatorial election.
