= South Lake =

South Lake or Southlake may refer to:

== Lakes ==
=== Canada ===
- South Lake, Antigonish, Nova Scotia
- South Lake, Halifax, Nova Scotia
- South Lake, Hants, Nova Scotia
- South Lake, Victoria, Nova Scotia

=== China ===
- South Lake (Jiaxing), Jiaxing, Zhejiang
- South Lake (Wuhan), Wuhan, Hubei

=== United States ===
- South Lake (Inyo County, California), a lake featured in the film Baraka
- South Lake (New York), in Herkimer County
- South Lake (Hamilton County, New York)

== Places ==
- South Lake, Western Australia, a suburb of Perth, Australia
- South Lake, Saskatchewan, a resort village in Canada
- South Lake, Kern County, California, a community in Kern County, California, United States
- South Lake, Pasadena, California, a neighborhood of Pasadena, California, United States
- Southlake, Texas, a wealthy suburb of Fort Worth, Texas, United States

== Other uses ==
- Southlake Regional Health Centre, a hospital in Newmarket, Ontario, Canada

== See also ==
- Nanhu (disambiguation)
- North-South Lake, a lake in New York state
- South Lake Tahoe, California
- South Lakes, Alaska
- Southern Lakes (disambiguation)
