= List of United States urban areas =

Urban areas of the United States as of the 2020 census.

This is a list of urban areas in the United States as defined by the United States Census Bureau, ordered according to their 2020 census populations. An urban area is defined by the Census Bureau as a contiguous set of census blocks that are "densely developed residential, commercial, and other nonresidential areas".

Urban areas consist of a densely-settled urban core, plus surrounding developed areas that meet certain density criteria. Since urban areas are composed of census blocks and not cities, counties, or county-equivalents, urban area boundaries may consist of partial areas of these political units. Urban areas are distinguished from rural areas: any area not part of an urban area is considered to be rural by the Census Bureau. The list in this article includes urban areas with a population of at least 50,000, but urban areas may have as few as 5,000 residents or 2,000 housing units. Some cities may also be a part of two or more urban areas, as is the case for Huntsville, and the smaller Huntsville Southeast.

== Definition ==
For the 2020 census, the Census Bureau redefined the classification of urban areas. The criteria were finalized on March 24, 2022, after a period of public input, and the final results of delineation were published on December 29, 2022. Key changes for the 2020 criteria included:

- The removal of the distinction between urbanized areas and urban clusters. Urbanized areas were previously defined as urban areas with at least 50,000 residents, and urban clusters were urban areas with less than 50,000. All qualifying areas are now designated as urban areas.
- The use of housing unit density as an alternative minimum for inclusion: either 2,000 housing units or a population of 5,000 may qualify an area as an urban area. Previously, this minimum was 2,500 in population.
- The lowering of the allowable "jump distance" from 2.5 to 1.5 miles. A jump is a distance along a road to connect two urban territories surrounded by rural territory.

Largely as a result of the change in criteria, the proportion of American citizens living in urban areas fell between 2010 and 2020, from 80.7% to 80.0%. There were 2,644 urban areas identified by the Census Bureau for 2020. 510 had a population of 50,000 or more and are listed here.

== 2020 urban areas ==
=== Urban areas of the United States of America ===
Name (Note: In order to match the official lists from the U.S. Census Bureau and provide less clutter in the table, postal code abbreviations for the names of states are used in this column. For a list of the states and abbreviations used, please see the list of states and territories of the United States.)	Population	Land area (mi^{2})	Land area (km^{2})	Density (/mi^{2})	Density (/km^{2})
New York–Jersey City–Newark, NY–NJ	19,426,449	3,248.12	8,412.6	5,980.8	2,309.2
Los Angeles–Long Beach–Anaheim, CA	12,237,376	1,636.83	4,239.4	7,476.3	2,886.6
Chicago, IL–IN	8,671,746	2,337.89	6,055.1	3,709.2	1,432.1
Miami–Fort Lauderdale, FL	6,077,522	1,244.18	3,222.4	4,884.8	1,886.0
Houston, TX	5,853,575	1,752.69	4,539.4	3,339.8	1,289.5
Dallas–Fort Worth–Arlington, TX	5,732,354	1,746.90	4,524.4	3,281.5	1,267.0
Philadelphia, PA–NJ–DE–MD	5,696,125	1,898.19	4,916.3	3,000.8	1,158.6
Washington–Arlington, DC–VA–MD	5,174,759	1,294.51	3,352.8	3,997.5	1,543.4
Atlanta—Sandy Springs—Alpharetta, GA	5,100,112	2,553.05	6,612.4	1,997.7	771.3
Boston, MA–NH	4,382,009	1,655.89	4,288.7	2,646.3	1,021.8
Phoenix–Mesa–Scottsdale, AZ	3,976,313	1,110.48	2,876.1	3,580.7	1,382.5
Detroit, MI	3,776,890	1,284.83	3,327.7	2,939.6	1,135.0
Seattle–Tacoma, WA	3,544,011	982.52	2,544.7	3,607.1	1,392.7
San Francisco–Oakland, CA	3,515,933	513.80	1,330.7	6,843.0	2,642.1
San Diego, CA	3,070,300	674.72	1,747.5	4,550.5	1,756.9
Minneapolis–St. Paul, MN	2,914,866	1,014.79	2,628.3	2,872.4	1,109.0
Tampa–St. Petersburg, FL	2,783,045	968.94	2,509.5	2,872.3	1,109.0
Denver–Aurora, CO	2,686,147	644.54	1,669.4	4,167.5	1,609.1
Riverside–San Bernardino, CA	2,276,703	608.56	1,576.2	3,741.1	1,444.4
Baltimore, MD	2,212,038	654.93	1,696.3	3,377.5	1,304.1
Las Vegas–Henderson–Paradise, NV	2,196,623	435.29	1,127.4	5,046.3	1,948.4
St. Louis, MO–IL	2,156,323	910.37	2,357.8	2,368.6	914.5
Portland, OR–WA	2,104,238	519.30	1,345.0	4,052.1	1,564.5
San Antonio, TX	1,992,689	613.44	1,588.8	3,248.4	1,254.2
Sacramento, CA	1,946,618	467.58	1,211.0	4,163.2	1,607.4
Orlando, FL	1,853,896	644.61	1,669.5	2,876.0	1,110.4
San Juan, PR	1,844,410	763.60	1,977.7	2,415.4	932.6
San Jose, CA	1,837,446	285.48	739.4	6,436.4	2,485.1
Austin, TX	1,809,888	619.62	1,604.8	2,921.0	1,127.8
Pittsburgh, PA	1,745,039	906.64	2,348.2	1,924.7	743.1
Cleveland, OH	1,712,178	713.81	1,848.8	2,398.7	926.1
Indianapolis, IN	1,699,881	722.55	1,871.4	2,352.6	908.4
Cincinnati, OH–KY	1,686,744	752.28	1,948.4	2,242.2	865.7
Kansas City, MO–KS	1,674,218	714.10	1,849.5	2,344.5	905.2
Columbus, OH	1,567,254	516.16	1,336.8	3,036.4	1,172.3
Virginia Beach–Norfolk, VA	1,451,578	481.67	1,247.5	3,013.6	1,163.6
Charlotte, NC–SC	1,379,873	657.61	1,703.2	2,098.3	810.2
Milwaukee, WI	1,306,795	463.68	1,200.9	2,818.3	1,088.2
Providence, RI–MA	1,285,806	544.25	1,409.6	2,362.5	912.2
Jacksonville, FL	1,247,374	573.27	1,484.8	2,175.9	840.1
Salt Lake City, UT	1,178,533	300.42	778.1	3,923.0	1,514.7
Nashville-Davidson, TN	1,158,642	584.95	1,515.0	1,980.7	764.8
Raleigh, NC	1,106,646	554.82	1,437.0	1,994.6	770.1
Richmond, VA	1,059,150	512.35	1,327.0	2,067.3	798.2
Memphis, TN–MS–AR	1,056,190	491.27	1,272.4	2,149.9	830.1
Oklahoma City, OK	982,276	421.73	1,092.3	2,329.2	899.3
Hartford, CT	977,158	535.93	1,388.0	1,823.3	704.0
Louisville/Jefferson County, KY–IN	974,397	400.86	1,038.2	2,430.8	938.5
New Orleans, LA	963,212	270.27	700.0	3,563.8	1,376.0
Buffalo, NY	948,864	340.50	881.9	2,786.7	1,075.9
Bridgeport–Stamford, CT–NY	916,408	397.29	1,029.0	2,306.6	890.6
Tucson, AZ	875,441	357.35	925.5	2,449.8	945.9
El Paso, TX–NM	854,584	255.88	662.7	3,339.7	1,289.5
Honolulu, HI	853,252	144.97	375.5	5,885.6	2,272.4
Omaha, NE–IA	819,508	270.81	701.4	3,026.1	1,168.4
McAllen, TX	779,553	326.22	844.9	2,389.7	922.7
Bradenton–Sarasota–Venice, FL	779,075	404.28	1,047.1	1,927.1	744.0
Birmingham, AL	774,956	509.27	1,319.0	1,521.7	587.5
Albuquerque, NM	769,837	263.07	681.4	2,926.3	1,129.9
Tulsa, OK	722,810	338.32	876.3	2,136.5	824.9
Fresno, CA	717,589	159.11	412.1	4,510.0	1,741.3
Rochester, NY	704,327	291.83	755.8	2,413.5	931.9
Charleston, SC	684,773	339.06	878.2	2,019.6	779.8
Dayton, OH	674,046	319.89	828.5	2,107.1	813.6
Mission Viejo–Lake Forest–Laguna Niguel, CA	646,843	163.63	423.8	3,953.0	1,526.3
Colorado Springs, CO	632,494	200.36	518.9	3,156.7	1,218.8
Baton Rouge, LA	631,326	396.34	1,026.5	1,592.9	615.0
Allentown–Bethlehem, PA–NJ	621,703	261.55	677.4	2,377.0	917.8
Ogden–Layton, UT	608,857	212.60	550.6	2,863.9	1,105.8
Grand Rapids, MI	605,666	274.36	710.6	2,207.6	852.3
Cape Coral, FL	599,242	331.80	859.4	1,806.0	697.3
Knoxville, TN	597,257	431.91	1,118.6	1,382.8	533.9
Albany–Schenectady, NY	593,142	271.30	702.7	2,186.3	844.1
Columbia, SC	590,407	367.50	951.8	1,606.6	620.3
Provo–Orem, UT	588,609	161.11	417.3	3,653.5	1,410.6
Bakersfield, CA	570,235	132.12	342.2	4,316.0	1,666.4
New Haven, CT	561,456	298.01	771.8	1,884.0	727.4
Des Moines, IA	542,486	224.74	582.1	2,413.8	932.0
Akron, OH	541,879	300.64	778.6	1,802.4	695.9
Concord–Walnut Creek, CA	538,583	175.76	455.2	3,064.3	1,183.1
Temecula–Murrieta–Menifee, CA	528,991	150.47	389.7	3,515.5	1,357.3
Palm Bay–Melbourne, FL	510,675	250.55	648.9	2,038.3	787.0
McKinney–Frisco, TX	504,803	151.64	392.7	3,328.9	1,285.3
Wichita, KS	500,231	226.84	587.5	2,205.2	851.4
Toledo, OH–MI	497,952	240.71	623.4	2,068.6	798.7
Harrisburg, PA	490,859	250.25	648.1	1,961.5	757.3
Worcester, MA–CT	482,085	260.29	674.2	1,852.1	715.1
Little Rock, AR	461,864	267.82	693.6	1,724.6	665.9
Madison, WI	450,305	149.70	387.7	3,008.0	1,161.4
Spokane, WA	447,279	171.67	444.6	2,605.4	1,006.0
Reno, NV–CA	446,529	165.43	428.5	2,699.2	1,042.2
Springfield, MA–CT	442,145	201.77	522.6	2,191.4	846.1
Port St. Lucie, FL	437,745	224.23	580.8	1,952.2	753.8
Boise City, ID	433,180	139.23	360.6	3,111.2	1,201.3
Augusta-Richmond County, GA–SC	431,480	273.29	707.8	1,578.8	609.6
Denton–Lewisville, TX	429,461	150.48	389.7	2,853.9	1,101.9
Bonita Springs–Estero, FL	425,675	242.96	629.3	1,752.0	676.5
Winston-Salem, NC	420,924	310.79	804.9	1,354.4	522.9
Phoenix West–Goodyear–Avondale, AZ	419,946	127.61	330.5	3,290.8	1,270.6
Kissimmee–St. Cloud, FL	418,404	161.58	418.5	2,589.4	999.8
Stockton, CA	414,847	92.46	239.5	4,486.7	1,732.3
Syracuse, NY	413,660	180.53	467.6	2,291.3	884.7
The Woodlands–Conroe, TX	402,454	219.14	567.6	1,836.5	709.1
Daytona Beach–Palm Coast–Port Orange, FL	402,126	212.36	550.0	1,893.6	731.1
Chattanooga, TN–GA	398,569	291.70	755.5	1,366.4	527.6
Durham, NC	396,118	183.36	474.9	2,160.4	834.1
Lancaster–Manheim, PA	394,530	181.53	470.2	2,173.3	839.1
Pensacola, FL–AL	390,172	262.54	680.0	1,486.2	573.8
Greenville, SC	387,271	262.17	679.0	1,477.2	570.3
Oxnard–San Buenaventura (Ventura), CA	376,117	76.61	198.4	4,909.7	1,895.6
Fayetteville–Springdale–Rogers, AR–MO	373,687	198.27	513.5	1,884.7	727.7
Trenton, NJ	370,422	133.13	344.8	2,782.4	1,074.3
Scranton, PA	366,713	162.16	420.0	2,261.4	873.1
Indio–Palm Desert–Palm Springs, CA	361,075	151.82	393.2	2,378.3	918.3
Palmdale–Lancaster, CA	359,559	84.78	219.6	4,240.9	1,637.4
Modesto, CA	357,301	70.38	182.3	5,076.8	1,960.2
Victorville–Hesperia–Apple Valley, CA (Note: Commonly known as the Victor Valley)	355,816	131.77	341.3	2,700.2	1,042.5
Jackson, MS	347,693	237.16	614.2	1,466.1	566.1
Corpus Christi, TX	339,066	129.27	334.8	2,622.9	1,012.7
Greensboro, NC	338,928	169.31	438.5	2,001.9	772.9
Fort Wayne, IN	335,934	163.60	423.7	2,053.4	792.8
Huntsville, AL	329,066	214.77	556.2	1,532.2	591.6
Fort Collins, CO	326,332	117.98	305.6	2,766.1	1,068.0
Antioch, CA	326,205	73.35	190.0	4,447.4	1,717.2
Fayetteville, NC	325,008	195.92	507.4	1,658.8	640.5
Mobile, AL	321,907	220.75	571.7	1,458.3	563.0
Youngstown, OH	320,901	195.96	507.5	1,637.6	632.3
Lansing, MI	318,300	155.83	403.6	2,042.6	788.7
Ann Arbor, MI	317,689	143.45	371.5	2,214.6	855.0
Lexington-Fayette, KY	315,631	83.99	217.5	3,757.8	1,450.9
Poughkeepsie–Newburgh, NY	314,766	209.92	543.7	1,499.4	578.9
Savannah, GA	309,466	205.85	533.1	1,503.4	580.5
Barnstable, MA	303,269	341.28	883.9	888.6	343.1
Flint, MI	298,964	205.46	532.1	1,455.1	561.8
Myrtle Beach–North Myrtle Beach, SC–NC	298,954	218.94	567.0	1,365.5	527.2
Santa Rosa, CA	297,329	79.39	205.6	3,745.1	1,446.0
Canton, OH	295,319	180.19	466.7	1,638.9	632.8
Atlantic City–Ocean City–Villas, NJ	294,921	162.87	421.8	1,810.7	699.1
Lincoln, NE	291,217	94.17	243.9	3,092.3	1,194.0
Shreveport, LA	288,052	180.84	468.4	1,592.8	615.0
Asheville, NC	285,776	248.58	643.8	1,149.6	443.9
Davenport, IA–IL	285,211	134.86	349.3	2,114.9	816.6
Springfield, MO	282,651	134.33	347.9	2,104.1	812.4
South Bend, IN–MI	278,921	147.93	383.1	1,885.5	728.0
Concord, NC	278,612	200.06	518.1	1,392.7	537.7
Santa Clarita, CA	278,031	77.85	201.6	3,571.6	1,379.0
Lakeland, FL	277,915	145.93	378.0	1,904.4	735.3
Rockford, IL	276,443	133.81	346.6	2,065.9	797.6
Reading, PA	276,278	96.12	249.0	2,874.3	1,109.8
Lubbock, TX	272,280	106.27	275.2	2,562.1	989.2
Eugene, OR	270,179	73.49	190.3	3,676.6	1,419.6
Salem, OR	268,331	72.68	188.2	3,691.8	1,425.4
Columbus, GA–AL	267,746	142.86	370.0	1,874.2	723.6
Round Lake Beach–McHenry–Grayslake, IL–WI	261,835	127.61	330.5	2,051.8	792.2
Peoria, IL	259,781	145.79	377.6	1,781.9	688.0
Killeen, TX	257,222	100.42	260.1	2,561.4	989.0
Kennewick–Richland–Pasco, WA	255,401	112.21	290.6	2,276.0	878.8
Wilmington, NC	255,329	142.25	368.4	1,795.0	693.0
Montgomery, AL	254,348	145.10	375.8	1,752.9	676.8
Winter Haven, FL	253,251	142.72	369.6	1,774.5	685.1
Tallahassee, FL	252,934	125.46	324.9	2,016.1	778.4
Laredo, TX	251,462	64.20	166.3	3,916.6	1,512.2
Anchorage, AK	249,252	91.69	237.5	2,718.4	1,049.6
Nashua, NH–MA	242,984	195.56	506.5	1,242.5	479.7
Livermore–Pleasanton–Dublin, CA	240,381	65.26	169.0	3,683.5	1,422.2
York, PA	238,549	113.08	292.9	2,109.6	814.5
Gulfport–Biloxi, MS	236,344	168.64	436.8	1,401.5	541.1
Aguadilla–Isabela–San Sebastián, PR	232,573	187.32	485.2	1,241.6	479.4
Appleton, WI	230,967	107.78	279.1	2,143.0	827.4
Lafayette, LA	227,316	161.20	417.5	1,410.1	544.5
Navarre–Miramar Beach–Destin, FL	226,213	119.62	309.8	1,891.1	730.2
Bremerton, WA	224,449	146.91	380.5	1,527.8	589.9
Green Bay, WI	224,156	113.66	294.4	1,972.2	761.5
Rock Hill, SC	218,443	145.15	375.9	1,504.9	581.1
Roanoke, VA	217,312	125.50	325.0	1,731.6	668.6
Brownsville, TX	216,444	62.10	160.8	3,485.3	1,345.7
Fargo, ND–MN	216,214	77.73	201.3	2,781.6	1,074.0
Bel Air–Aberdeen, MD	214,647	107.20	277.6	2,002.3	773.1
Thousand Oaks, CA	213,986	80.20	207.7	2,668.3	1,030.2
Gainesville, FL	213,748	87.70	227.1	2,437.3	941.1
Deltona, FL	210,712	108.98	282.3	1,933.4	746.5
Olympia–Lacey, WA	208,157	106.21	275.1	1,960.0	756.7
Evansville, IN	206,855	112.75	292.0	1,834.6	708.3
College Station–Bryan, TX	206,137	81.63	211.4	2,525.4	975.1
Amarillo, TX	205,860	83.99	217.5	2,450.9	946.3
Portland, ME	205,356	123.88	320.8	1,657.7	640.1
Kalamazoo, MI	204,562	109.46	283.5	1,868.8	721.6
Santa Barbara, CA	202,197	54.81	142.0	3,688.9	1,424.3
Hickory, NC	201,511	221.34	573.3	910.4	351.5
Clarksville, TN–KY	200,947	113.09	292.9	1,776.9	686.1
Huntington, WV–KY–OH	200,157	128.87	333.8	1,553.1	599.7
Port Charlotte–North Port, FL	199,998	134.69	348.9	1,484.8	573.3
Waterbury, CT	199,317	92.44	239.4	2,156.2	832.5
Lorain–Elyria, OH	199,067	90.61	234.7	2,196.9	848.2
Hagerstown, MD–WV–PA–VA	197,557	120.77	312.8	1,635.8	631.6
Spartanburg, SC	196,943	181.00	468.8	1,088.1	420.1
Sioux Falls, SD	194,283	67.90	175.9	2,861.3	1,104.8
Cedar Rapids, IA	192,844	86.03	222.8	2,241.6	865.5
Waco, TX	192,844	89.88	232.8	2,145.6	828.4
Galveston–Texas City, TX	191,863	108.98	282.3	1,760.5	679.7
Erie, PA	187,820	73.34	189.9	2,561.0	988.8
Ocala, FL	182,647	125.03	323.8	1,460.9	564.0
Nampa, ID	177,561	65.86	170.6	2,695.9	1,040.9
Salinas, CA	177,532	29.88	77.4	5,941.2	2,293.9
Murfreesboro, TN	177,313	86.13	223.1	2,058.6	794.8
Gastonia, NC	176,897	124.58	322.7	1,420.0	548.2
Frederick, MD	176,456	80.29	208.0	2,197.7	848.5
Vallejo, CA	175,132	39.64	102.7	4,418.0	1,705.8
Vero Beach–Sebastian, FL	174,292	106.10	274.8	1,642.7	634.2
Hemet, CA	173,194	37.06	96.0	4,673.6	1,804.5
Danbury, CT–NY	171,680	118.49	306.9	1,448.9	559.4
Medford, OR	171,640	63.02	163.2	2,723.6	1,051.6
Spring Hill, FL	169,050	127.25	329.6	1,328.5	512.9
Santa Cruz, CA	169,038	60.45	156.6	2,796.3	1,079.7
High Point, NC	167,830	100.79	261.1	1,665.1	642.9
Fredericksburg, VA	167,679	89.62	232.1	1,871.0	722.4
Norwich–New London, CT	167,432	116.72	302.3	1,434.5	553.9
Muskegon–Norton Shores, MI	166,414	112.06	290.2	1,485.0	573.4
Gainesville, GA	164,365	149.13	386.3	1,102.1	425.5
Manchester, NH	163,289	80.63	208.8	2,025.1	781.9
Lake Charles, LA	162,501	127.74	330.9	1,272.1	491.2
Panama City–Panama City Beach, FL	162,060	119.47	309.4	1,356.5	523.7
The Villages–Lady Lake, FL	161,736	98.52	255.2	1,641.6	633.8
Visalia, CA	160,578	37.70	97.7	4,258.9	1,644.4
Marysville, WA	160,440	67.80	175.6	2,366.4	913.7
Mauldin–Simpsonville, SC	159,506	101.20	262.1	1,576.1	608.5
Springfield, IL	159,265	81.74	211.7	1,948.5	752.3
Lafayette, IN	157,100	68.74	178.0	2,285.4	882.4
Tuscaloosa, AL	156,450	88.16	228.3	1,774.6	685.2
Binghamton, NY	155,942	69.73	180.6	2,236.4	863.5
New Bedford, MA	155,491	59.31	153.6	2,621.8	1,012.3
Odessa, TX	154,818	86.00	222.7	1,800.3	695.1
Leesburg–Eustis–Tavares, FL	151,523	86.09	223.0	1,760.0	679.5
Fairfield, CA	150,122	40.81	105.7	3,678.7	1,420.3
Merced, CA	150,052	43.08	111.6	3,483.4	1,344.9
Topeka, KS	148,956	84.24	218.2	1,768.2	682.7
Elkhart, IN–MI	148,199	94.94	245.9	1,561.0	602.7
Champaign, IL	147,452	46.52	120.5	3,169.3	1,223.7
Beaumont, TX	146,649	96.10	248.9	1,526.0	589.2
South Lyon–Hamburg–Genoa, MI	145,963	119.51	309.5	1,221.4	471.6
Houma, LA	145,482	94.89	245.8	1,533.2	592.0
Burlington, NC	145,311	92.02	238.3	1,579.2	609.7
Santa Maria, CA	143,609	27.06	70.1	5,306.8	2,049.0
Athens-Clarke County, GA	143,213	91.85	237.9	1,559.3	602.0
Midland, TX	141,997	68.29	176.9	2,079.4	802.9
Columbia, MO	141,831	67.20	174.0	2,110.6	814.9
Warner Robins, GA	141,132	88.31	228.7	1,598.1	617.0
Charleston, WV	140,958	92.92	240.7	1,516.9	585.7
Macon-Bibb County, GA	140,111	99.27	257.1	1,411.4	544.9
Las Cruces, NM	139,338	64.47	167.0	2,161.2	834.5
Greeley, CO	137,222	37.30	96.6	3,679.0	1,420.5
Grand Junction, CO	135,973	75.61	195.8	1,798.4	694.4
Yuma, AZ–CA	135,717	52.96	137.2	2,562.8	989.5
Racine, WI	134,877	52.26	135.3	2,581.0	996.5
St. George, UT	134,109	61.03	158.1	2,197.5	848.5
Bloomington–Normal, IL	134,100	50.36	130.4	2,662.7	1,028.1
Yakima, WA	133,145	55.77	144.4	2,387.4	921.8
Tyler, TX	131,028	81.53	211.2	1,607.1	620.5
Bellingham, WA	128,979	50.13	129.8	2,572.8	993.4
Billings, MT	128,787	54.70	141.7	2,354.4	909.1
Johnson City, TN	128,519	106.03	274.6	1,212.1	468.0
Dededo–Apotgan–Tamuning, GU	128,164	55.16	142.9	2,323.5	897.1
Simi Valley, CA	127,364	31.63	81.9	4,027.0	1,554.8
Iowa City, IA	126,810	50.83	131.7	2,494.6	963.2
Kenosha, WI	125,865	56.17	145.5	2,240.8	865.2
Fort Smith, AR–OK	125,811	73.97	191.6	1,700.8	656.7
Yuba City, CA	125,706	30.00	77.7	4,190.3	1,617.9
Lynchburg, VA	125,596	91.60	237.2	1,371.2	529.4
Arecibo, PR	123,724	75.49	195.5	1,638.9	632.8
Seaside–Monterey–Pacific Grove, CA	123,495	41.18	106.7	2,998.8	1,157.8
Dover, DE	123,101	72.30	187.3	1,702.5	657.4
Coeur d'Alene, ID	121,831	46.76	121.1	2,605.7	1,006.1
Rochester, MN	121,587	51.59	133.6	2,356.7	909.9
Tracy–Mountain House, CA	120,912	27.05	70.1	4,469.1	1,725.5
Boulder, CO	120,828	25.45	65.9	4,747.9	1,833.2
Pueblo, CO	120,642	54.70	141.7	2,205.4	851.5
Redding, CA	120,602	67.06	173.7	1,798.4	694.4
Norman, OK	120,191	45.96	119.0	2,615.0	1,009.7
Greenville, NC	120,150	66.38	171.9	1,810.1	698.9
Monroe, LA	119,964	90.97	235.6	1,318.7	509.2
Duluth, MN–WI	119,411	66.87	173.2	1,785.8	689.5
Utica, NY	119,059	52.04	134.8	2,287.6	883.3
Harlingen, TX	118,838	54.16	140.3	2,194.3	847.2
Waldorf, MD	118,601	59.35	153.7	1,998.3	771.5
Anderson–Clemson, SC	118,369	95.94	248.5	1,233.8	476.4
Ponce, PR	118,345	31.72	82.2	3,730.9	1,440.5
Abilene, TX	118,138	61.97	160.5	1,906.3	736.0
Kailua (Honolulu County)–Kaneohe, HI	118,092	29.28	75.8	4,032.6	1,557.0
Burlington, VT	118,032	62.01	160.6	1,903.3	734.9
St. Cloud, MN	117,638	53.97	139.8	2,179.7	841.6
Port Arthur, TX	116,819	66.46	172.1	1,757.6	678.6
Saginaw, MI	116,058	65.73	170.2	1,765.7	681.7
Gilroy–Morgan Hill, CA	114,833	42.54	110.2	2,699.4	1,042.2
Temple, TX	114,632	58.39	151.2	1,963.4	758.1
Waterloo, IA	114,139	63.71	165.0	1,791.6	691.7
Logan, UT	113,927	47.72	123.6	2,387.2	921.7
Mandeville–Covington, LA	113,763	84.33	218.4	1,349.0	520.9
Sioux City, IA–NE–SD	113,066	55.03	142.5	2,054.4	793.2
Leominster–Fitchburg, MA	111,790	52.93	137.1	2,111.9	815.4
Chico, CA	111,411	33.72	87.3	3,304.5	1,275.9
Jacksonville, NC	111,224	75.65	195.9	1,470.1	567.6
Bloomington, IN	110,103	43.04	111.5	2,558.4	987.8
Longview, TX	107,099	90.26	233.8	1,186.6	458.2
Holland, MI	107,034	64.80	167.8	1,651.7	637.7
Bend, OR	106,988	42.41	109.8	2,522.9	974.1
Eau Claire, WI	105,475	62.50	161.9	1,687.7	651.6
Idaho Falls, ID	105,132	41.26	106.9	2,548.1	983.8
Charlottesville, VA	104,191	36.87	95.5	2,825.7	1,091.0
Vacaville, CA	101,027	21.59	55.9	4,679.4	1,806.7
Auburn, AL	100,842	61.16	158.4	1,648.9	636.7
Longmont, CO	100,776	24.17	62.6	4,169.6	1,609.9
New Braunfels, TX	100,736	50.43	130.6	1,997.7	771.3
San Angelo, TX	99,982	49.27	127.6	2,029.4	783.6
La Crosse, WI–MN	98,872	42.24	109.4	2,340.8	903.8
Kingsport, TN–VA	98,411	94.05	243.6	1,046.4	404.0
Bismarck, ND	98,198	41.85	108.4	2,346.2	905.9
Bowling Green, KY	97,814	52.18	135.1	1,874.7	723.8
San Germán–Cabo Rojo–Sabana Grande, PR	97,241	70.59	182.8	1,377.6	531.9
Wichita Falls, TX	97,039	50.78	131.5	1,910.8	737.8
Beverly Hills–Homosassa Springs–Pine Ridge, FL	96,729	118.83	307.8	814.0	314.3
Lafayette–Erie–Louisville, CO	96,485	34.99	90.6	2,757.5	1,064.7
Portsmouth, NH–ME	95,090	114.35	296.2	831.6	321.1
Lawrence, KS	94,998	29.92	77.5	3,174.5	1,225.7
Santa Fe, NM	94,241	46.80	121.2	2,013.6	777.5
Middletown, OH	93,608	53.62	138.9	1,745.9	674.1
Prescott–Prescott Valley, AZ	92,427	48.75	126.3	1,895.8	732.0
Four Corners, FL	92,396	84.48	218.8	1,093.7	422.3
Lee's Summit, MO	91,960	37.59	97.4	2,446.1	944.4
St. Augustine, FL	91,786	57.78	149.6	1,588.6	613.4
Slidell, LA	91,587	52.53	136.1	1,743.4	673.1
Mayagüez, PR	91,583	50.14	129.9	1,826.4	705.2
Amherst Town–Northampton–Easthampton Town, MA	90,570	54.65	141.5	1,657.2	639.8
Williamsburg, VA	89,585	69.87	181.0	1,282.2	495.1
Florence, SC	89,436	68.04	176.2	1,314.5	507.5
Missoula, MT	88,109	44.29	114.7	1,989.3	768.1
Lawton, OK	87,464	46.83	121.3	1,867.5	721.1
Vineland, NJ	87,226	56.99	147.6	1,530.5	590.9
Joplin, MO	86,679	60.53	156.8	1,432.0	552.9
Manteca, CA	86,674	20.47	53.0	4,234.1	1,634.8
Decatur, IL	86,287	55.11	142.7	1,565.8	604.6
Albany, GA	85,960	66.51	172.3	1,292.5	499.0
Rapid City, SD	85,679	50.33	130.4	1,702.4	657.3
Castle Rock, CO	85,350	35.71	92.5	2,390.4	922.9
Napa, CA	84,619	20.35	52.7	4,158.7	1,605.7
Muncie, IN	84,382	48.20	124.8	1,750.6	675.9
Jackson, MI	84,307	52.03	134.8	1,620.4	625.6
State College, PA	83,674	25.92	67.1	3,228.3	1,246.5
Winchester, VA	83,377	42.22	109.4	1,974.8	762.5
Springfield, OH	82,369	45.08	116.8	1,827.3	705.5
Port Huron, MI	82,226	52.51	136.0	1,565.9	604.6
Madera, CA	81,635	20.96	54.3	3,894.8	1,503.8
Newark, OH	81,223	44.09	114.2	1,842.2	711.3
Hattiesburg, MS	80,821	63.62	164.8	1,270.4	490.5
Terre Haute, IN	79,862	46.83	121.3	1,705.2	658.4
Flagstaff, AZ	79,842	29.26	75.8	2,728.5	1,053.5
Anderson, IN	79,517	52.17	135.1	1,524.2	588.5
Alton, IL	79,260	59.66	154.5	1,328.6	513.0
Cheyenne, WY	79,250	33.87	87.7	2,339.5	903.3
Turlock, CA	79,203	16.89	43.8	4,688.3	1,810.2
Florence, AL	78,925	54.63	141.5	1,444.8	557.8
Texarkana, TX–AR	78,744	66.64	172.6	1,181.6	456.2
Alexandria, LA	78,305	64.71	167.6	1,210.1	467.2
Anniston–Oxford, AL	78,302	78.90	204.3	992.5	383.2
Wenatchee, WA	78,142	32.60	84.4	2,396.8	925.4
Salisbury, MD–DE	78,075	48.39	125.3	1,613.3	622.9
Morgantown, WV	77,620	40.70	105.4	1,907.2	736.4
Wausau, WI	77,429	48.74	126.2	1,588.7	613.4
St. Joseph, MO–KS	77,187	44.35	114.9	1,740.5	672.0
Davis, CA	77,034	12.16	31.5	6,333.8	2,445.5
Fairhope–Daphne, AL	76,807	59.07	153.0	1,300.4	502.1
Valdosta, GA	76,769	41.29	106.9	1,859.3	717.9
Elizabethtown–Radcliff, KY	76,441	55.83	144.6	1,369.3	528.7
Owensboro, KY	76,433	36.40	94.3	2,099.9	810.8
Camarillo, CA	76,338	22.48	58.2	3,396.0	1,311.2
Oshkosh, WI	76,190	32.84	85.1	2,319.9	895.7
Saratoga Springs, NY	75,684	55.58	144.0	1,361.7	525.8
Battle Creek, MI	75,513	47.33	122.6	1,595.4	616.0
Lebanon, PA	75,485	32.71	84.7	2,307.8	891.0
Altoona, PA	74,426	37.01	95.9	2,010.9	776.4
El Centro, CA	74,376	19.35	50.1	3,843.4	1,483.9
Sheboygan, WI	74,369	35.31	91.5	2,106.2	813.2
Cleveland, TN	73,918	54.97	142.4	1,344.6	519.2
Jonesboro, AR	73,781	46.49	120.4	1,586.9	612.7
Mansfield, OH	73,545	47.68	123.5	1,542.3	595.5
Harrisonburg, VA	73,377	31.10	80.6	2,359.1	910.9
Lodi, CA	73,090	16.34	42.3	4,473.0	1,727.1
Jackson, TN	72,809	47.74	123.7	1,525.0	588.8
Hammond, LA	72,526	76.42	197.9	949.0	366.4
Dothan, AL	72,423	55.09	142.7	1,314.7	507.6
Blacksburg–Christiansburg, VA	72,400	33.98	88.0	2,130.7	822.7
Dover–Rochester, NH–ME	72,391	52.31	135.5	1,383.8	534.3
Janesville, WI	72,285	36.65	94.9	1,972.2	761.5
Pocatello, ID	72,211	27.46	71.1	2,629.3	1,015.2
Bluffton East–Hilton Head Island, SC	71,824	63.24	163.8	1,135.7	438.5
Kiryas Joel, NY	71,582	28.75	74.5	2,489.5	961.2
Fairbanks, AK	71,396	74.30	192.4	960.9	371.0
Michigan City–La Porte, IN–MI	71,367	49.16	127.3	1,451.7	560.5
Glens Falls, NY	71,191	51.62	133.7	1,379.2	532.5
San Marcos, TX	70,801	24.44	63.3	2,897.1	1,118.6
Bristol, TN–VA	70,638	68.69	177.9	1,028.4	397.1
Tulare, CA	70,628	17.71	45.9	3,987.1	1,539.4
Dubuque, IA–IL	70,332	34.17	88.5	2,058.5	794.8
Porterville, CA	69,862	16.35	42.3	4,273.0	1,649.8
Longview, WA–OR	69,841	35.19	91.1	1,984.6	766.3
Sumter, SC	68,825	57.65	149.3	1,193.8	460.9
Brunswick–St. Simons, GA	68,750	59.01	152.8	1,165.1	449.9
Watsonville, CA	68,668	14.70	38.1	4,671.4	1,803.6
Lima, OH	68,630	48.66	126.0	1,410.4	544.6
Fajardo, PR	68,587	34.36	89.0	1,996.2	770.7
Bay City, MI	68,472	39.93	103.4	1,714.7	662.1
Grand Forks, ND–MN	68,160	26.48	68.6	2,573.6	993.7
Dalton, GA	67,830	57.49	148.9	1,179.9	455.6
El Paso de Robles (Paso Robles)–Atascadero, CA	67,804	29.96	77.6	2,262.9	873.7
Casper, WY	67,751	27.88	72.2	2,430.2	938.3
Great Falls, MT	67,097	30.30	78.5	2,214.1	854.9
Mount Vernon, WA	66,825	30.66	79.4	2,179.3	841.4
Corvallis, OR	66,791	17.45	45.2	3,826.9	1,477.6
Sherman–Denison, TX	66,691	38.49	99.7	1,732.5	668.9
Hanford, CA	66,638	18.23	47.2	3,655.2	1,411.3
Conway, AR	66,619	32.88	85.2	2,026.1	782.3
Morristown, TN	66,539	63.91	165.5	1,041.2	402.0
Kankakee, IL	66,530	31.66	82.0	2,101.4	811.3
Ames, IA	66,342	22.36	57.9	2,967.4	1,145.7
Victoria, TX	65,986	33.60	87.0	1,963.9	758.3
Petaluma, CA	65,227	20.96	54.3	3,111.4	1,201.3
Barceloneta–Florida–Bajadero, PR	65,070	41.70	108.0	1,560.4	602.5
Juana Díaz, PR	65,023	31.17	80.7	2,086.1	805.4
Steubenville–Weirton, OH–WV–PA	64,981	46.34	120.0	1,402.2	541.4
DeKalb, IL	64,736	25.63	66.4	2,525.6	975.1
Yauco, PR	63,885	34.91	90.4	1,830.2	706.6
Rocky Mount, NC	63,297	44.95	116.4	1,408.0	543.6
Sebring–Avon Park, FL	63,297	44.51	115.3	1,422.2	549.1
Beloit, WI–IL	63,073	31.94	82.7	1,975.0	762.6
Kokomo, IN	62,576	32.50	84.2	1,925.4	743.4
Parkersburg, WV–OH	62,500	39.90	103.3	1,566.6	604.9
Elmira, NY	62,468	31.70	82.1	1,970.7	760.9
Titusville, FL	62,459	39.96	103.5	1,563.2	603.6
Lexington Park–California–Chesapeake Ranch Estates, MD	62,352	46.65	120.8	1,336.5	516.0
Albany, OR	62,074	23.05	59.7	2,693.2	1,039.8
Benton Harbor–Lincoln–St. Joseph, MI	61,888	52.53	136.0	1,178.2	454.9
Sandusky–Port Clinton, OH	61,743	53.80	139.3	1,147.7	443.1
Carson City, NV	61,629	26.19	67.8	2,353.6	908.7
Bangor, ME	61,539	51.12	132.4	1,203.9	464.8
Johnstown, PA	61,521	34.70	89.9	1,773.1	684.6
Middletown, NY	61,516	25.96	67.2	2,369.6	914.9
Woodland, CA	61,133	12.77	33.1	4,788.9	1,849.0
Columbus, IN	60,982	27.86	72.2	2,188.8	845.1
Lewiston, ME	60,743	31.42	81.4	1,933.4	746.5
Decatur, AL	60,458	43.47	112.6	1,390.8	537.0
Manhattan, KS	60,454	25.84	66.9	2,339.7	903.4
Rome, GA	60,403	44.89	116.3	1,345.5	519.5
Spring Hill, TN	60,309	23.31	60.4	2,586.9	998.8
Mankato, MN	60,206	25.63	66.4	2,348.9	906.9
Hot Springs, AR	59,133	50.28	130.2	1,176.2	454.1
Ithaca, NY	59,102	24.56	63.6	2,406.6	929.2
Bozeman, MT	59,080	21.39	55.4	2,761.7	1,066.3
Staunton–Waynesboro, VA	59,065	39.15	101.4	1,508.9	582.6
Lake Havasu City, AZ	59,017	33.79	87.5	1,746.8	674.4
Twin Falls, ID	58,808	22.07	57.2	2,665.1	1,029.0
Gadsden, AL	57,975	61.21	158.5	947.2	365.7
Kahului–Wailuku, HI	57,905	13.52	35.0	4,284.0	1,654.1
Maricopa, AZ	57,771	13.20	34.2	4,376.6	1,689.8
Wheeling, WV–OH	57,695	36.81	95.3	1,567.4	605.2
Beckley, WV	57,468	53.64	138.9	1,071.5	413.7
Monroe, MI	57,260	35.35	91.5	1,620.0	625.5
San Luis Obispo, CA	56,904	14.11	36.5	4,033.7	1,557.4
Traverse City–Garfield, MI	56,890	52.42	135.8	1,085.3	419.1
Hanover, PA	56,712	25.71	66.6	2,205.8	851.7
Lake Jackson, TX	56,054	34.35	89.0	1,632.0	630.1
Grants Pass, OR	55,724	30.42	78.8	1,832.0	707.3
Cape Girardeau, MO–IL	55,546	31.22	80.9	1,779.4	687.0
Williamsport, PA	55,344	27.72	71.8	1,996.2	770.7
Zephyrhills, FL	55,133	34.10	88.3	1,616.6	624.2
Grand Island, NE	55,099	29.60	76.7	1,861.4	718.7
Lewiston, ID–WA	54,798	27.93	72.3	1,962.1	757.6
Fond du Lac, WI	54,731	24.69	63.9	2,216.7	855.9
Goldsboro, NC	54,456	53.16	137.7	1,024.4	395.5
Bullhead City, AZ–NV	54,396	35.39	91.7	1,536.9	593.4
Lompoc, CA	54,287	9.81	25.4	5,533.9	2,136.6
Sierra Vista, AZ	54,274	28.28	73.3	1,919.0	740.9
Eagle Pass, TX	54,083	21.14	54.8	2,557.7	987.5
Wasilla–Knik-Fairview–North Lakes, AK	53,444	57.63	149.3	927.4	358.1
Los Lunas, NM	53,365	39.42	102.1	1,353.8	522.7
Poinciana, FL	53,267	23.12	59.9	2,304.4	889.7
Hinesville, GA	53,107	37.23	96.4	1,426.4	550.7
Beaufort–Port Royal, SC	52,515	43.76	113.3	1,200.1	463.3
Helena, MT	52,380	31.68	82.1	1,653.4	638.4
Cartersville, GA	52,351	44.42	115.1	1,178.5	455.0
Midland, MI	52,340	38.15	98.8	1,372.1	529.8
Guayama, PR	52,290	21.77	56.4	2,402.3	927.6
Clayton, NC	51,898	36.26	93.9	1,431.2	552.6
Valparaiso–Shorewood Forest, IN	51,867	33.64	87.1	1,542.0	595.4
Watertown, NY	51,832	31.99	82.8	1,620.4	625.6
Farmington, NM	51,763	32.62	84.5	1,586.7	612.6
Pascagoula–Gautier, MS	51,454	38.61	100.0	1,332.8	514.6
Riverhead–Southold, NY	51,120	52.80	136.7	968.2	373.8
Casa Grande, AZ	50,981	21.46	55.6	2,375.1	917.0
Minot, ND	50,925	26.67	69.1	1,909.4	737.2
Arroyo Grande–Grover Beach–Pismo Beach, CA	50,885	17.07	44.2	2,980.1	1,150.6
Hazleton, PA	50,860	19.02	49.3	2,674.2	1,032.5
Paducah, KY–IL	50,833	41.41	107.3	1,227.5	474.0
Fernandina Beach–Yulee, FL	50,805	50.55	130.9	1,005.0	388.0
Jefferson City, MO	50,775	34.46	89.2	1,473.6	568.9
Pittsfield, MA	50,720	30.46	78.9	1,665.4	643.0
Pinehurst–Southern Pines, NC	50,319	47.56	123.2	1,058.1	408.5
Kingston, NY	50,254	31.10	80.5	1,616.0	623.9
Enid, OK	50,194	29.49	76.4	1,702.2	657.2
Winder, GA	50,189	51.75	134.0	969.8	374.5
Chambersburg, PA	50,094	34.68	89.8	1,444.7	557.8
Walla Walla, WA–OR	50,013	23.86	61.8	2,095.9	809.2

== Images ==
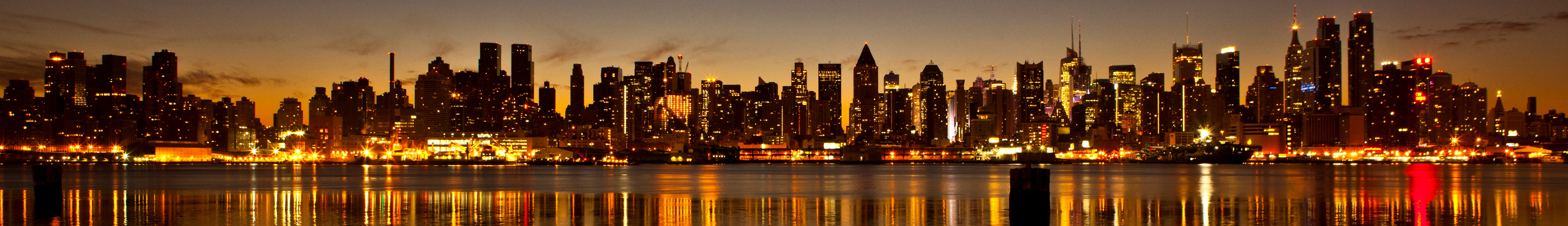
1 - New York City, New York

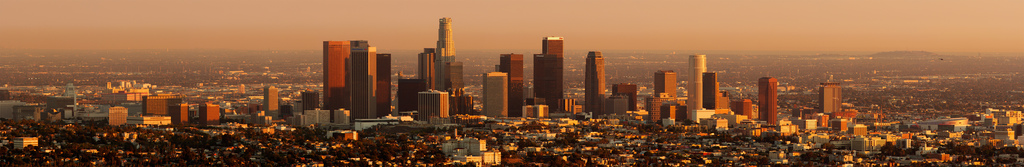
2 – Los Angeles, California

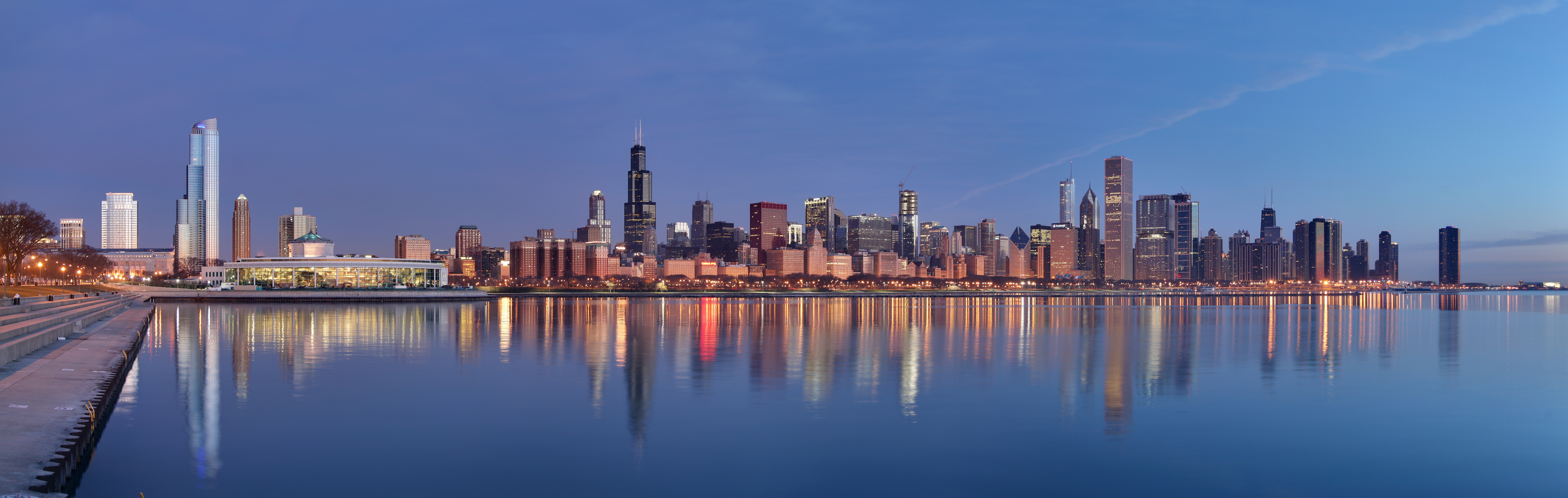
3 – Chicago, Illinois

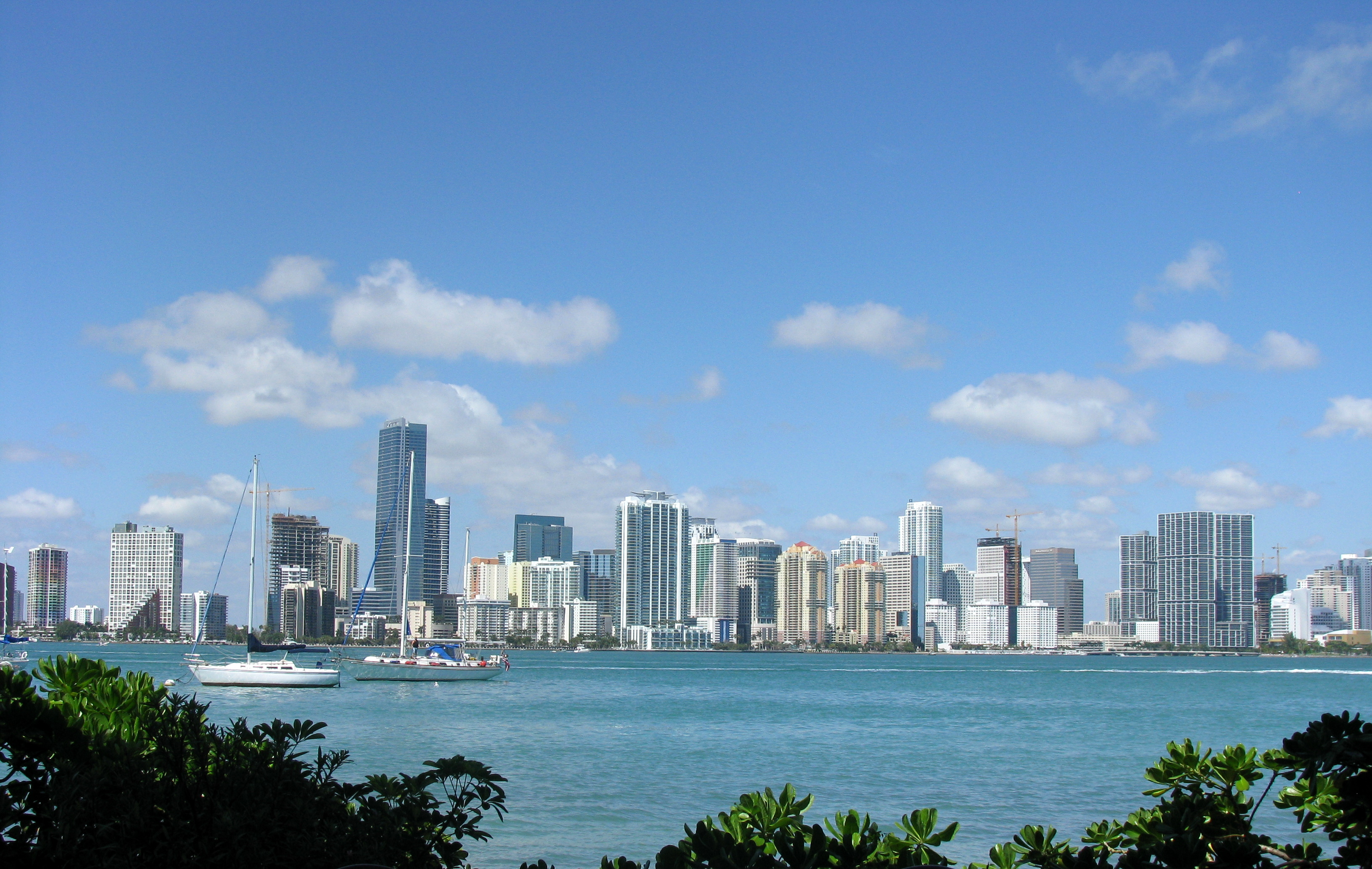
4 – Miami, Florida

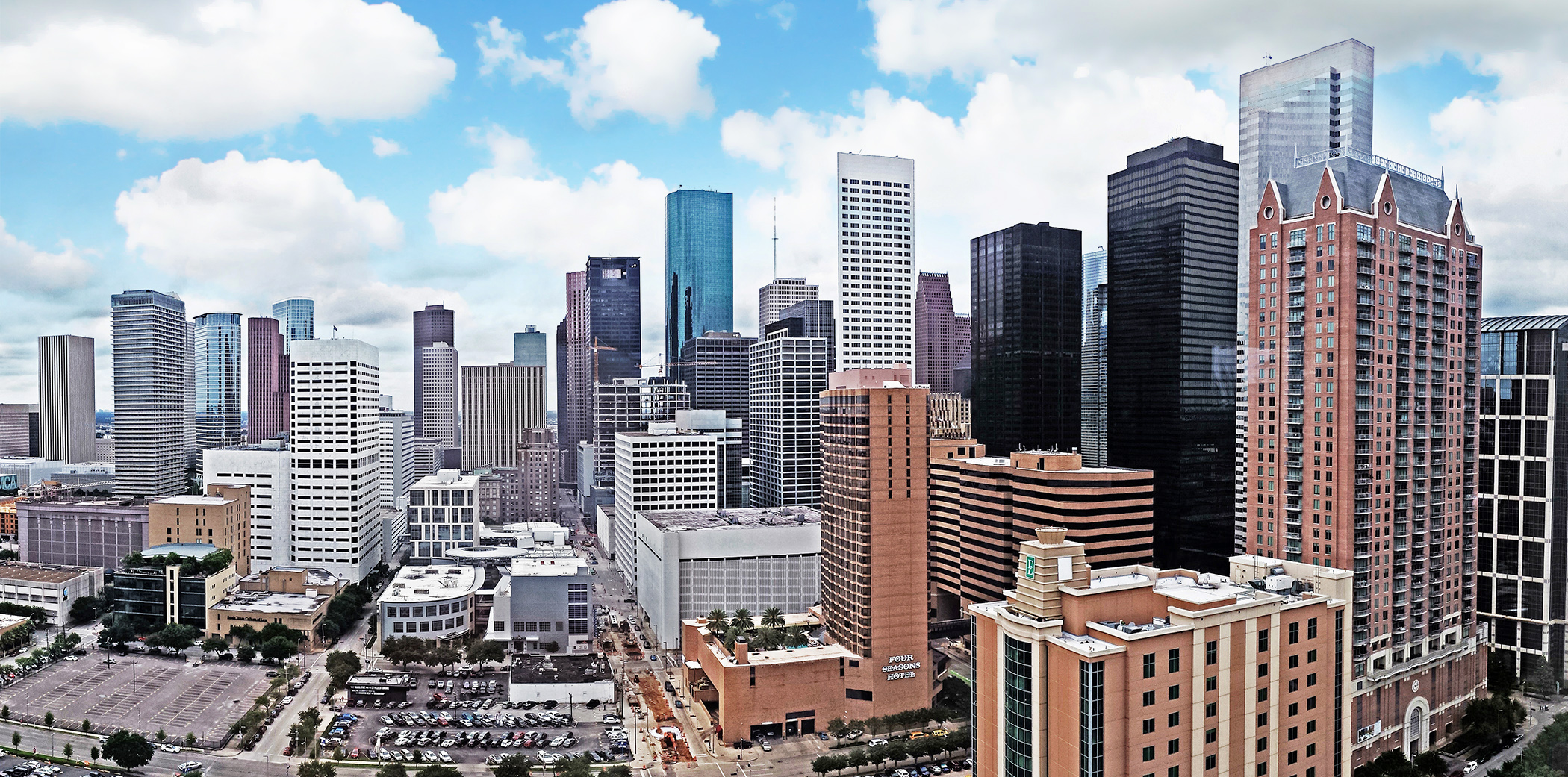
5 – Houston, Texas

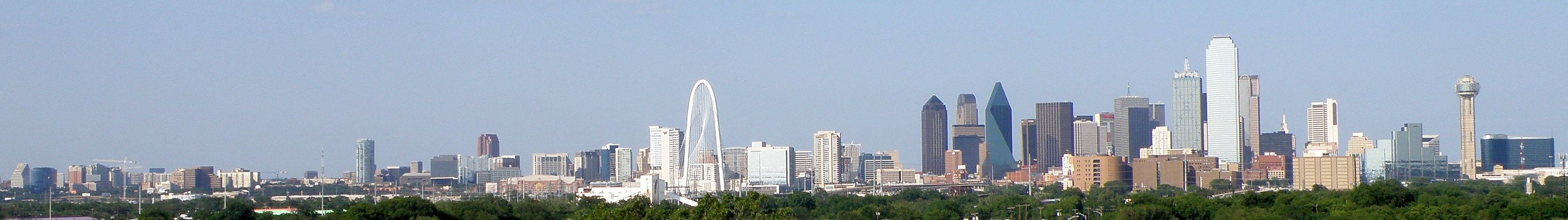
6 – Dallas, Texas

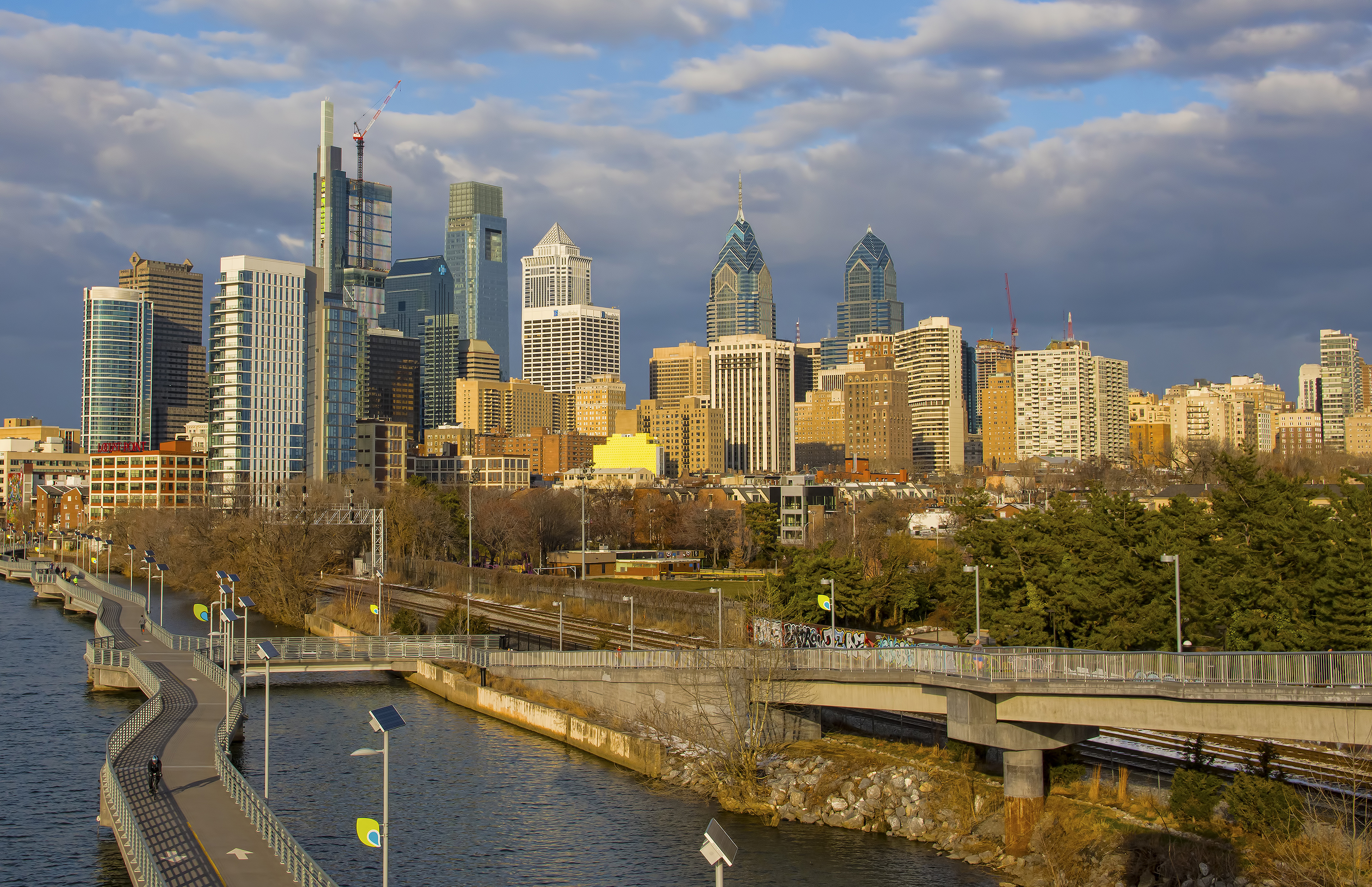
7 – Philadelphia, Pennsylvania

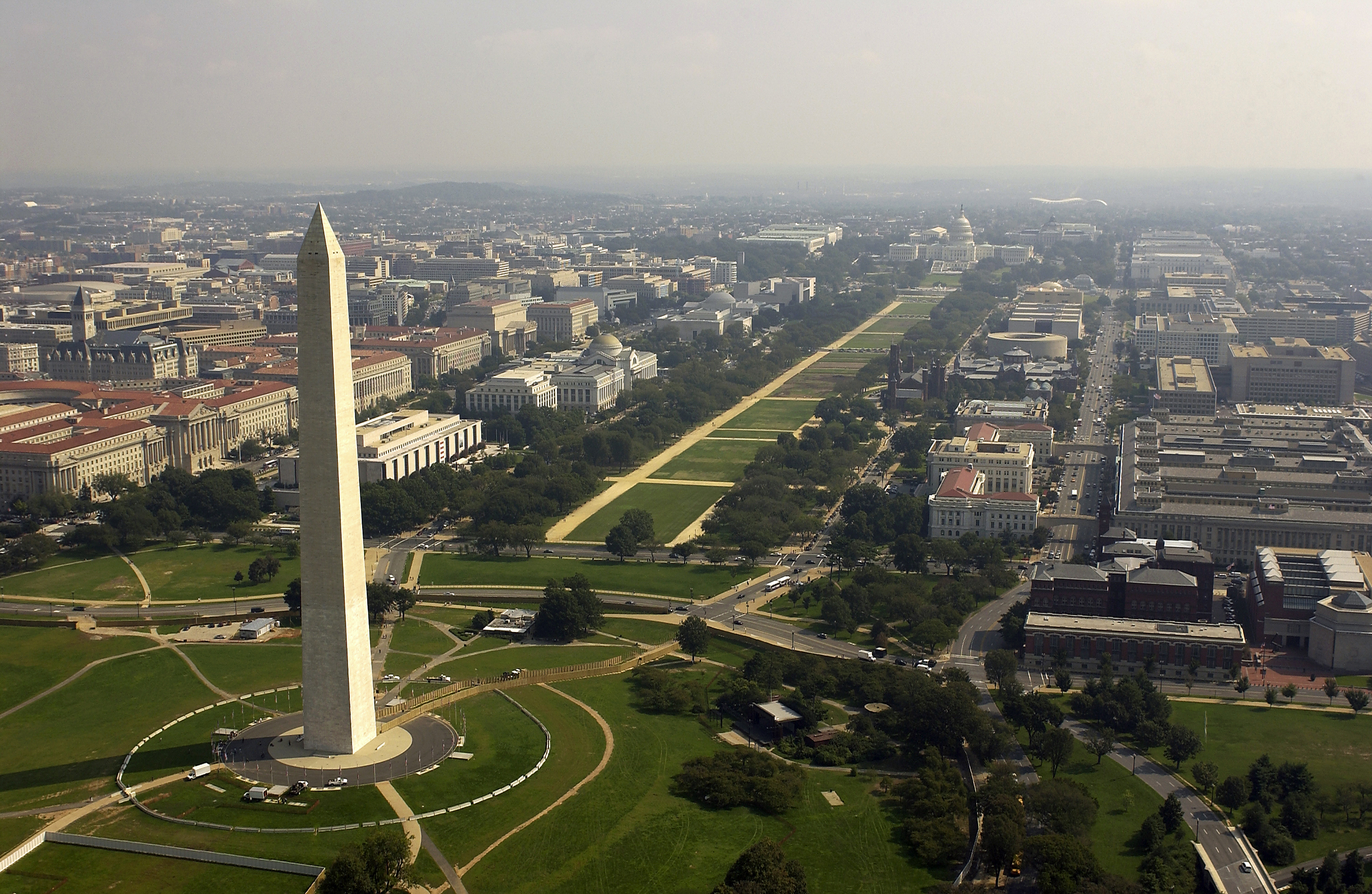
8 – Washington, D.C.

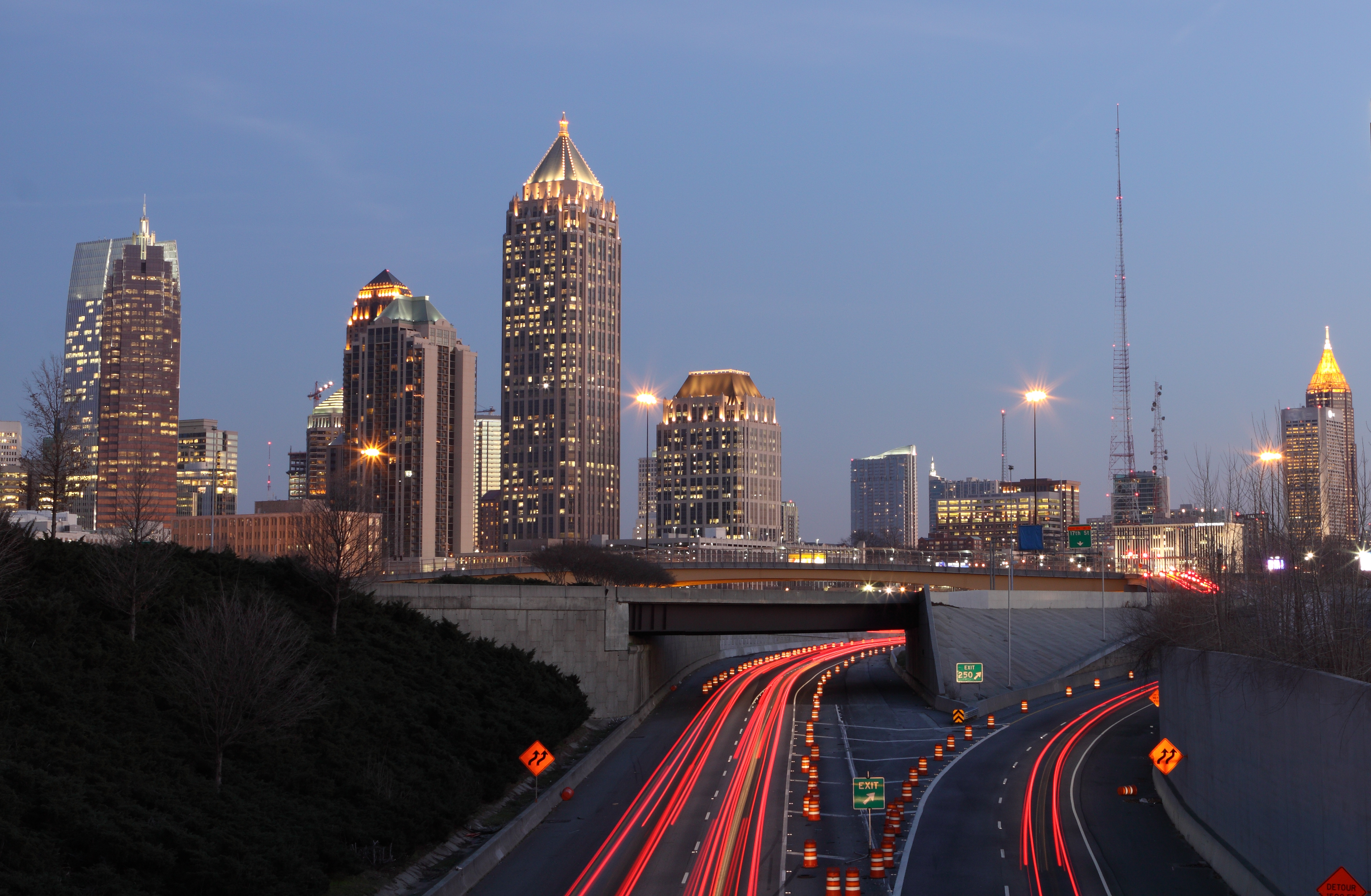
9 – Atlanta, Georgia

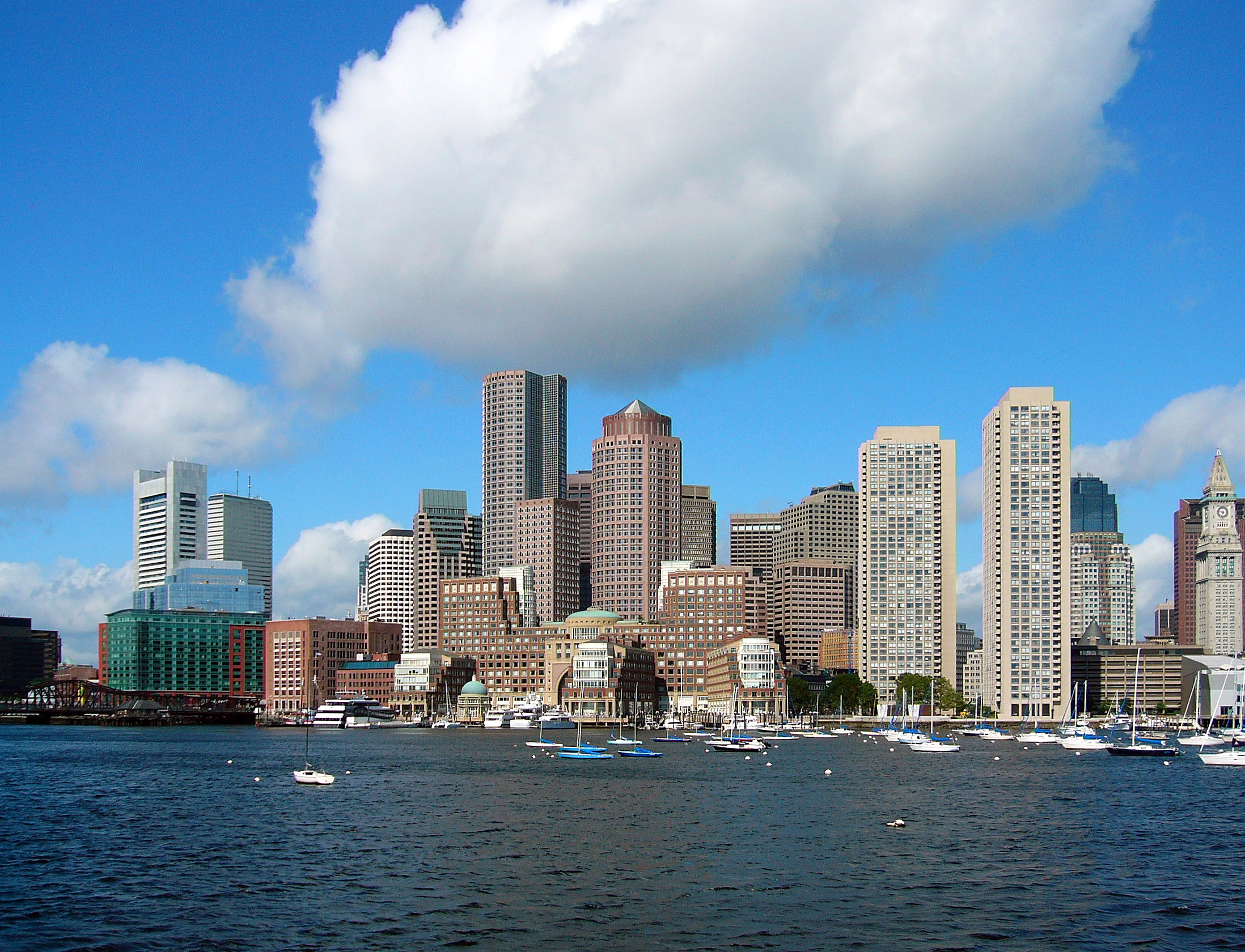
10 – Boston, Massachusetts

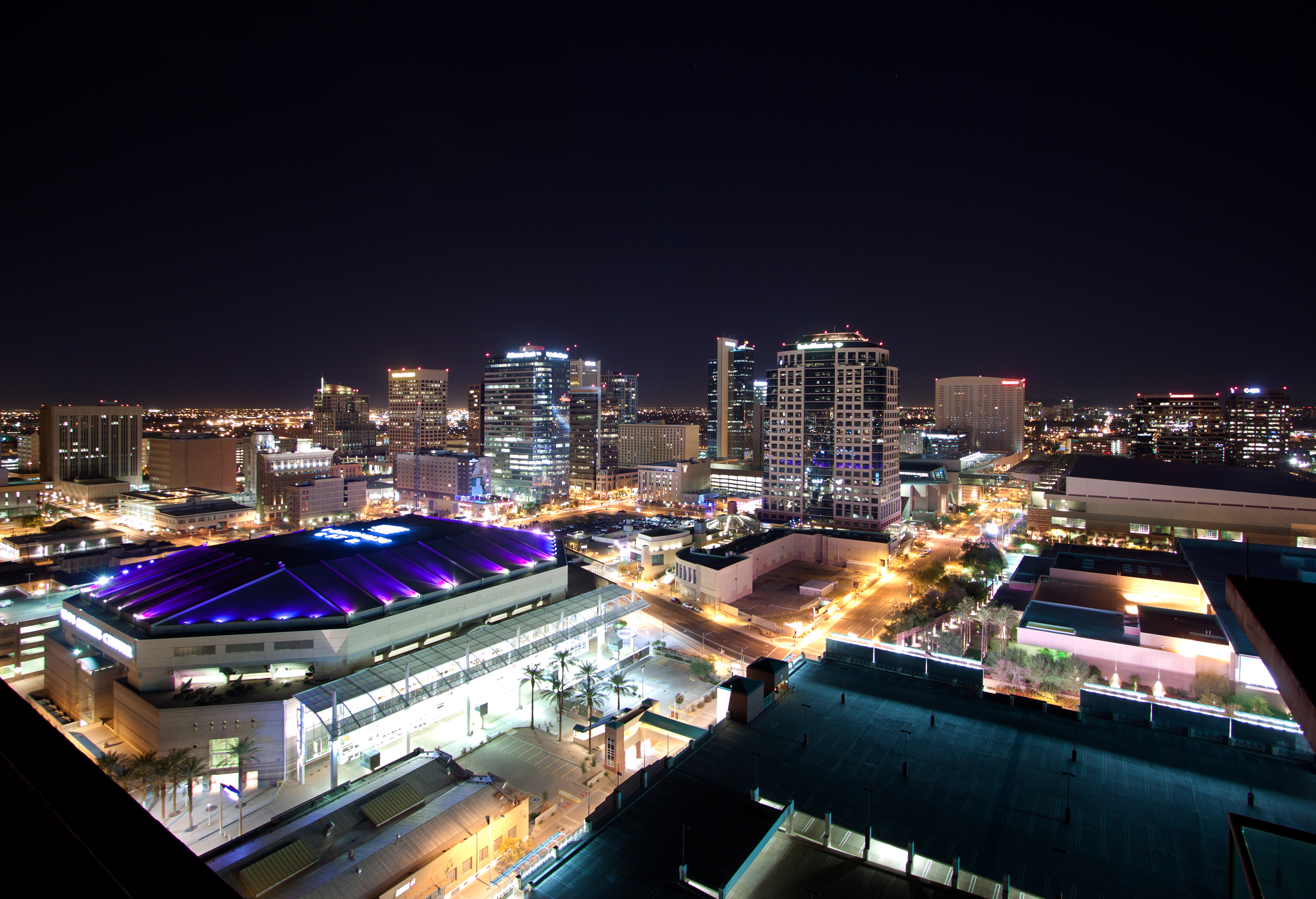
11 – Phoenix, Arizona

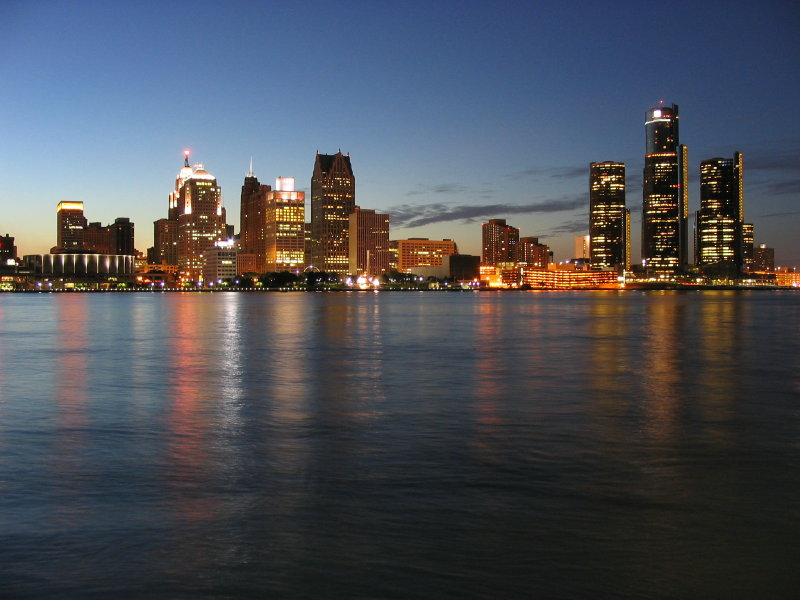
12 – Detroit, Michigan

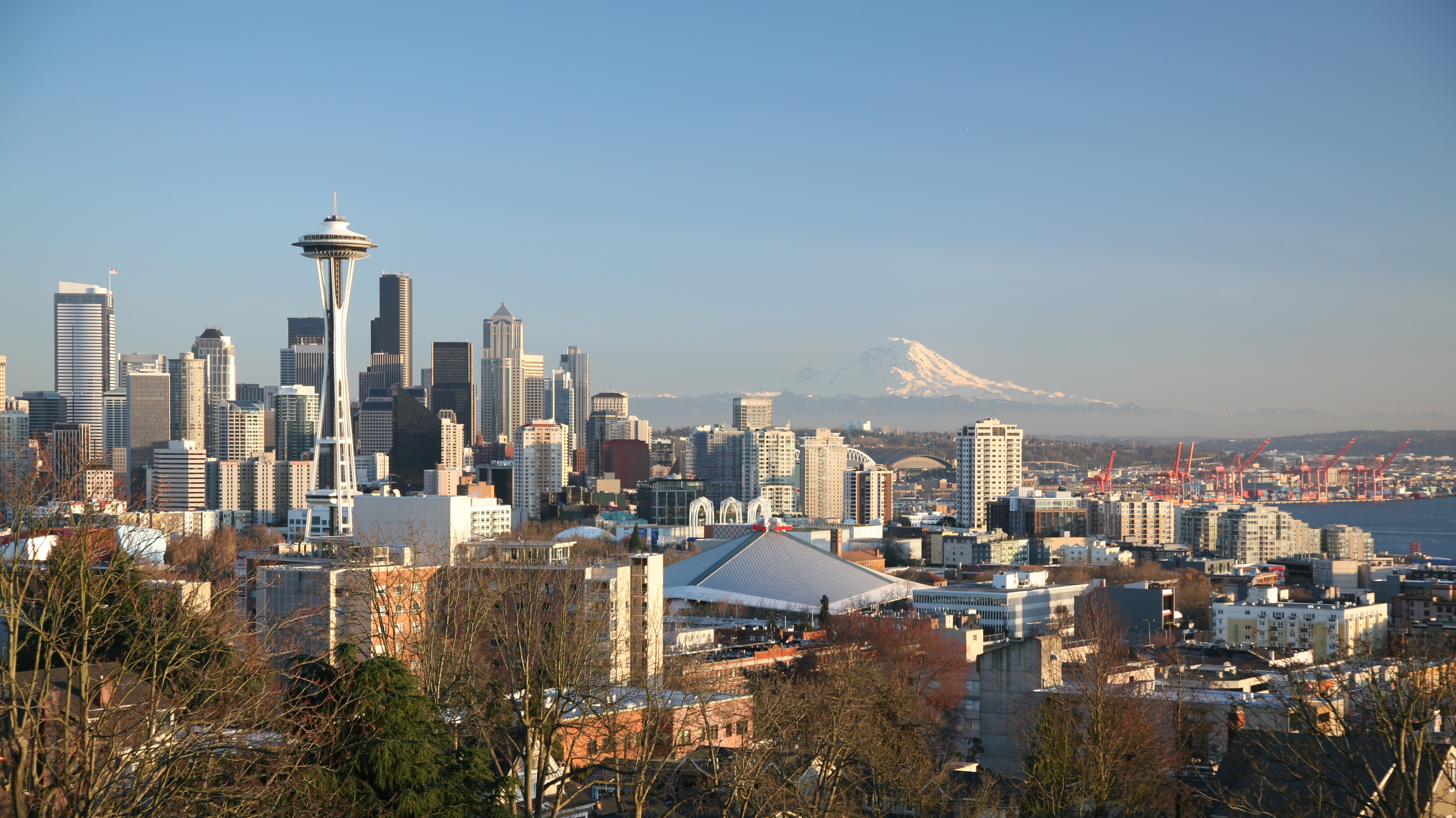
13 – Seattle, Washington

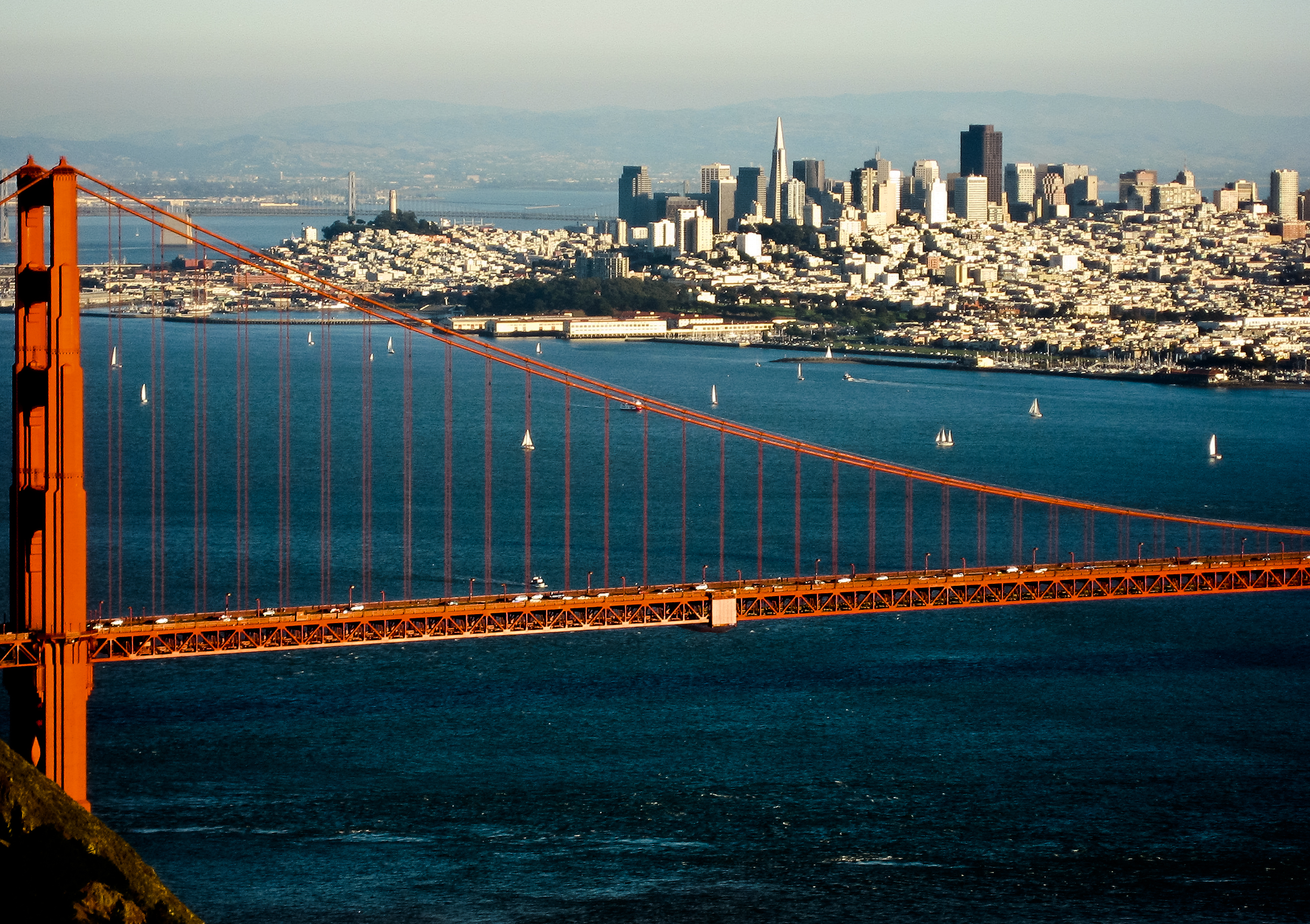
14 – San Francisco, California

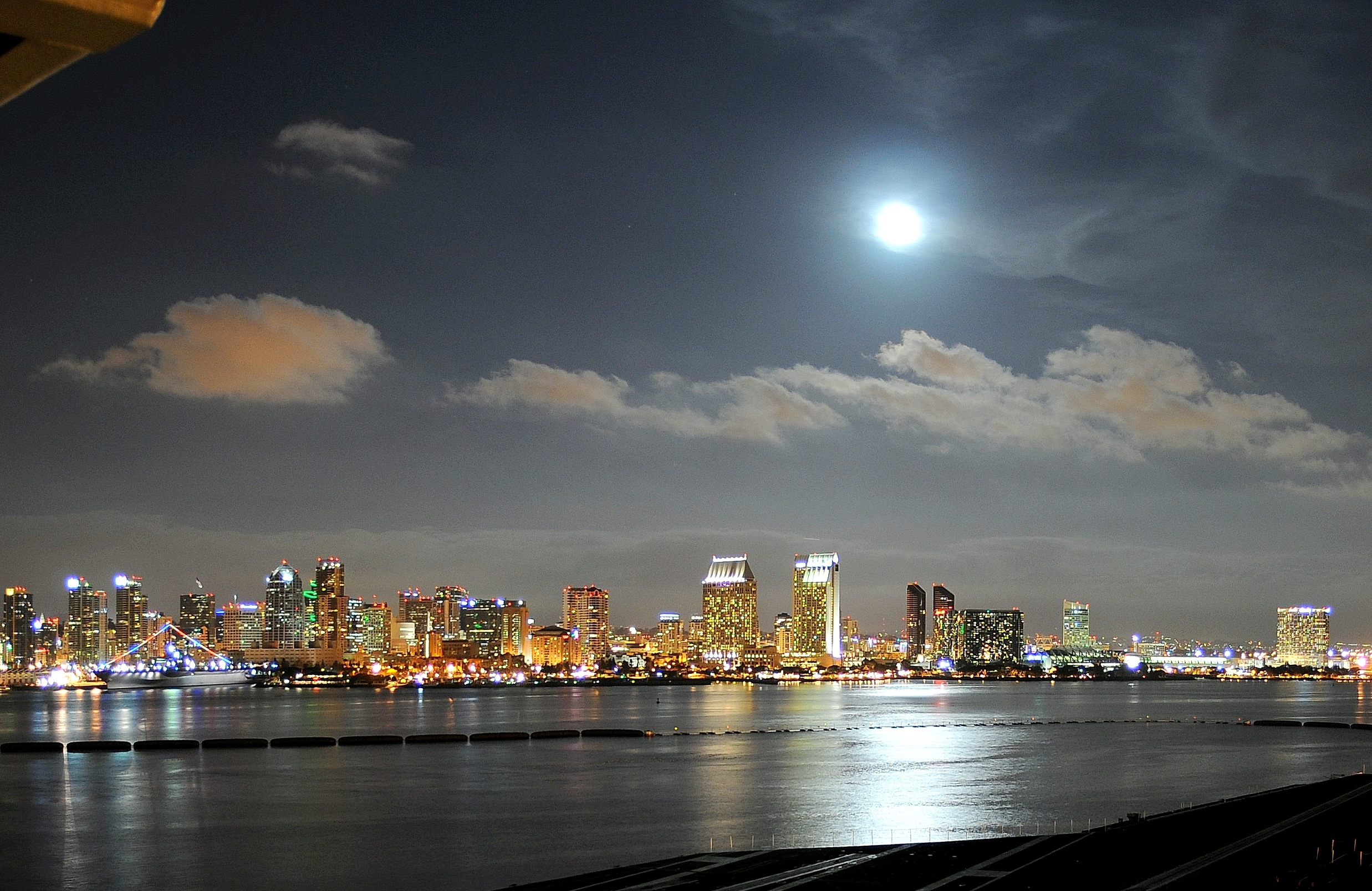
15 – San Diego, California

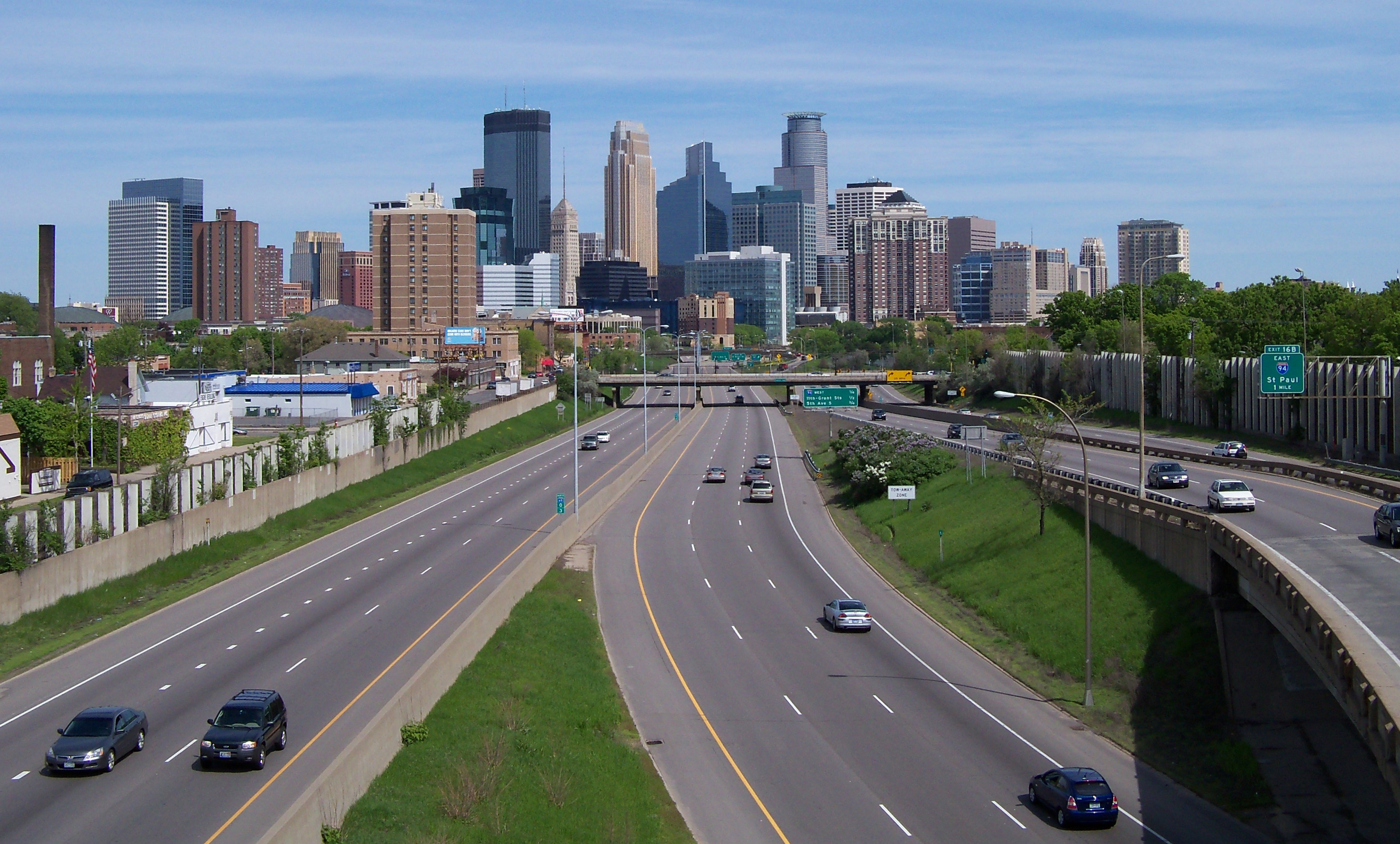
16 – Minneapolis, Minnesota

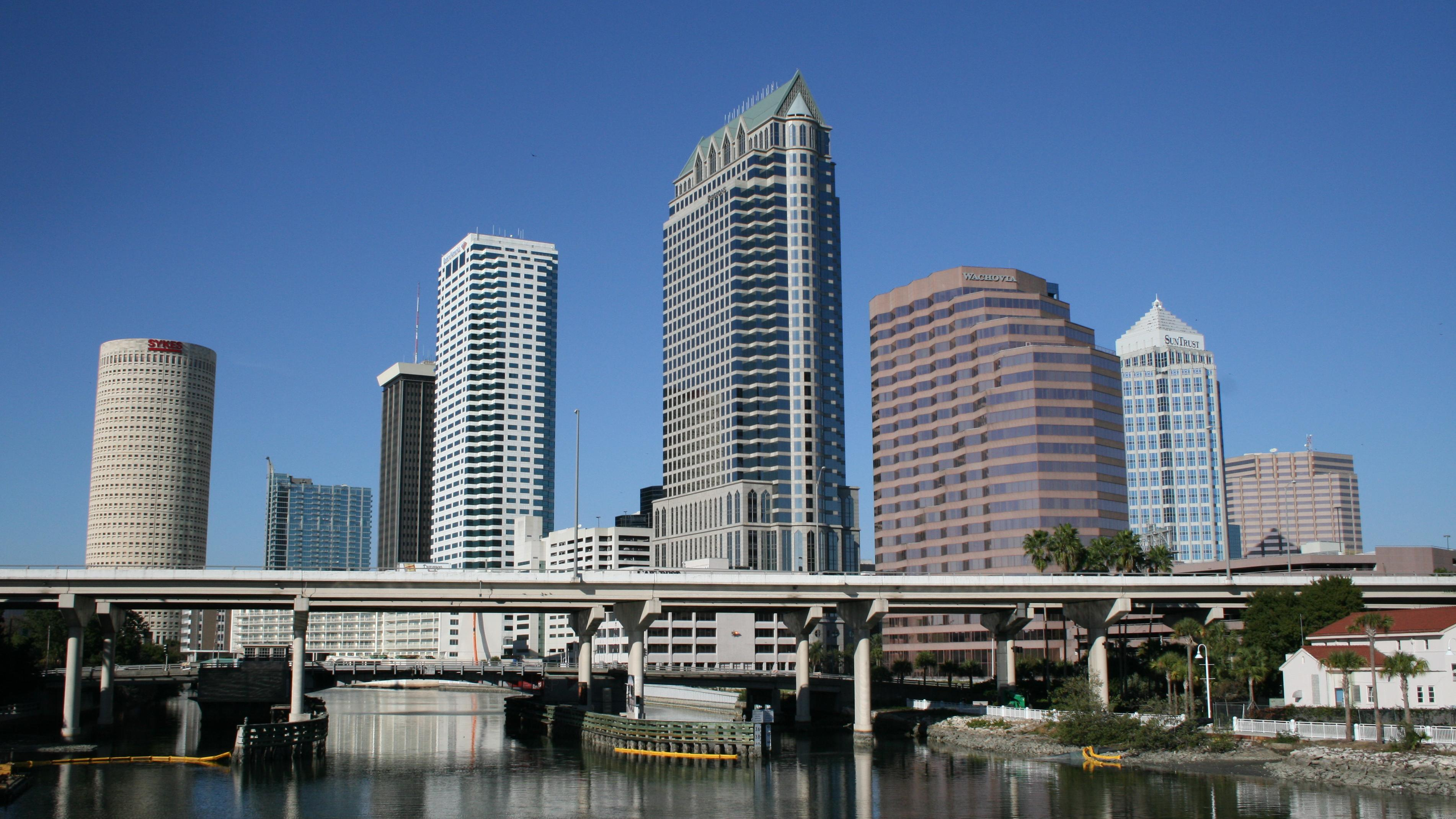
17 – Tampa, Florida

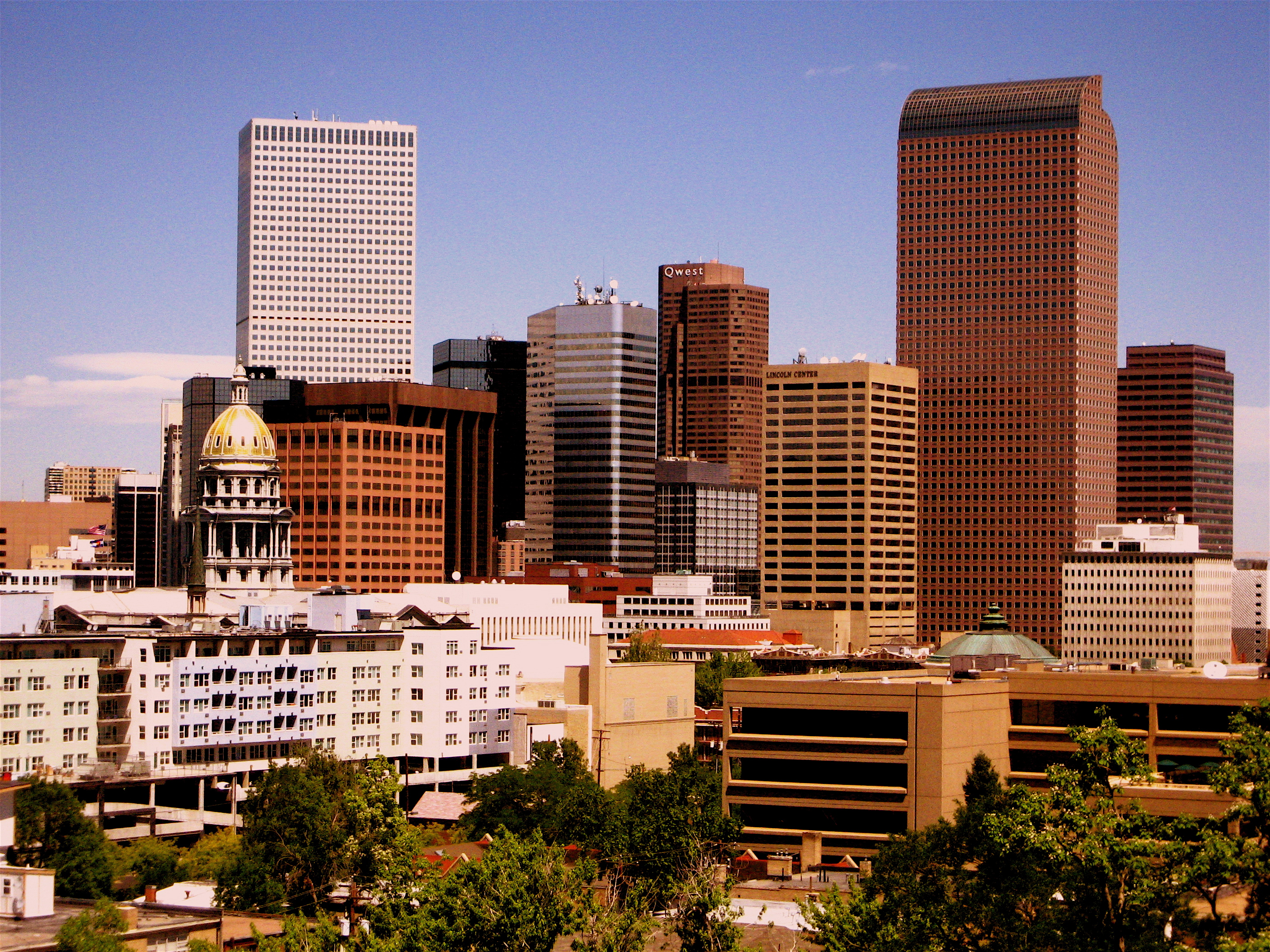
18 – Denver, Colorado

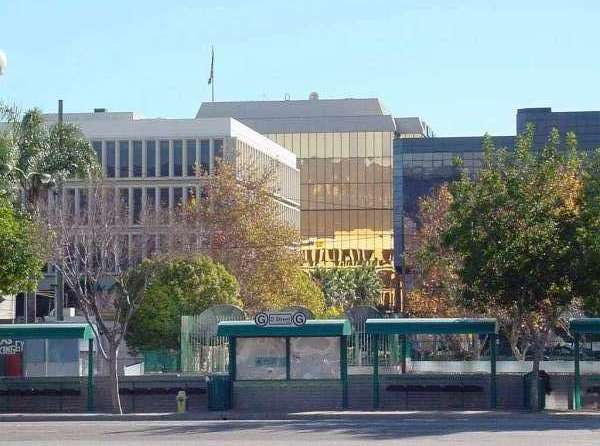
19 - San Bernardino/Riverside, California

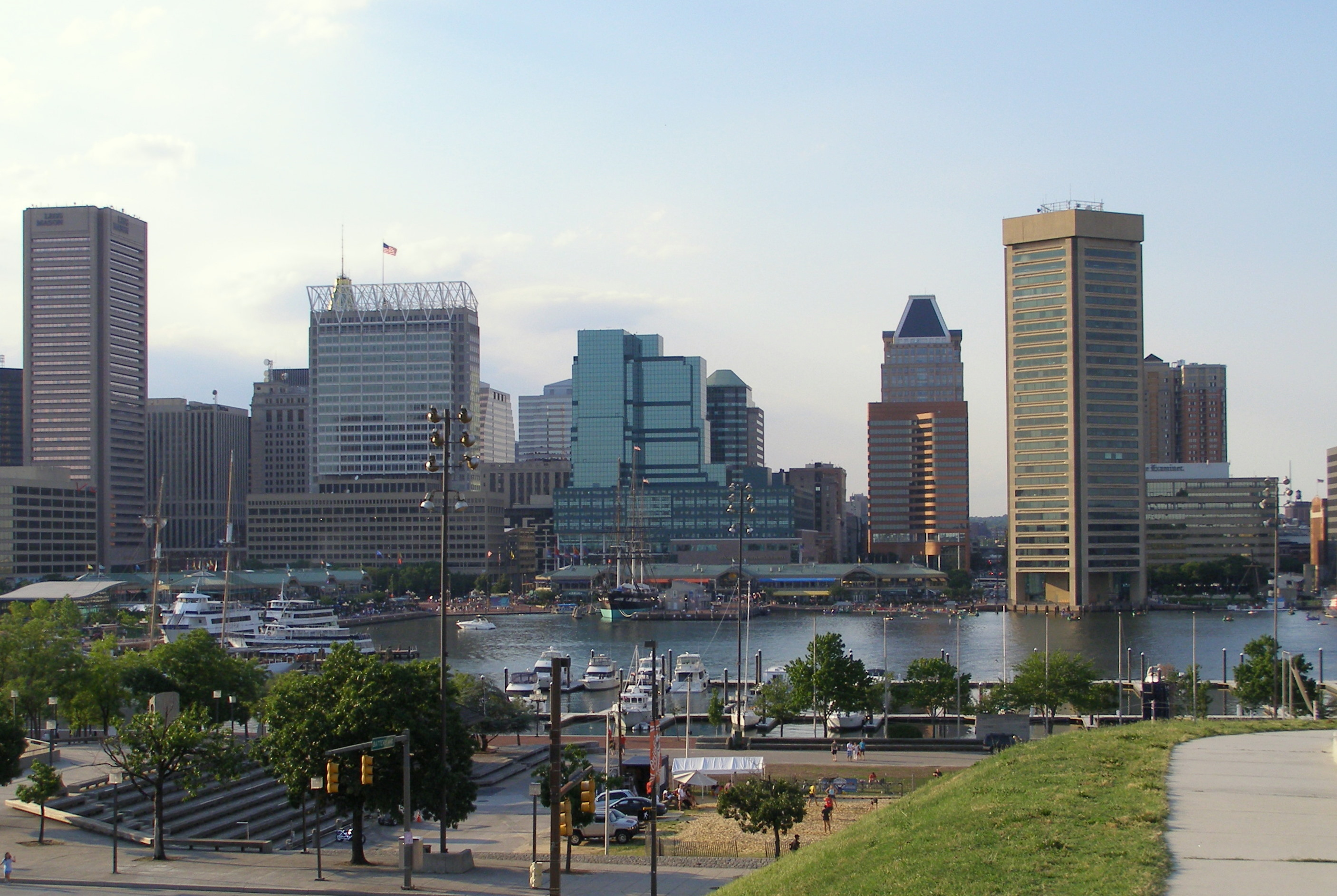
20 – Baltimore, Maryland

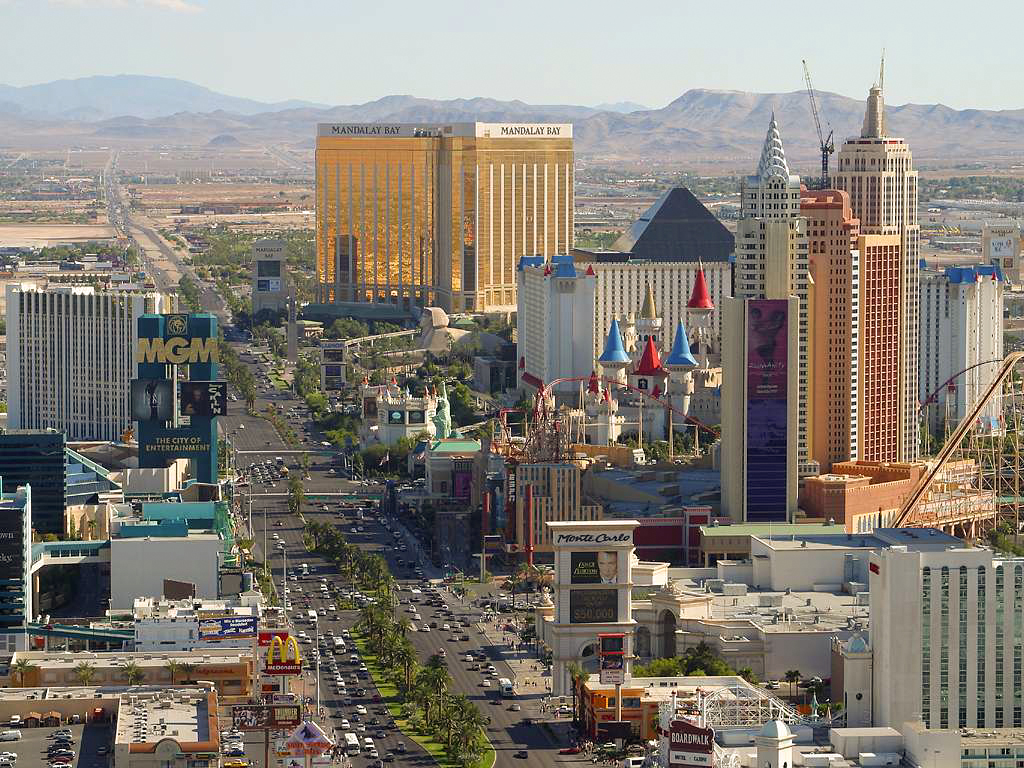
21 - Las Vegas, Nevada

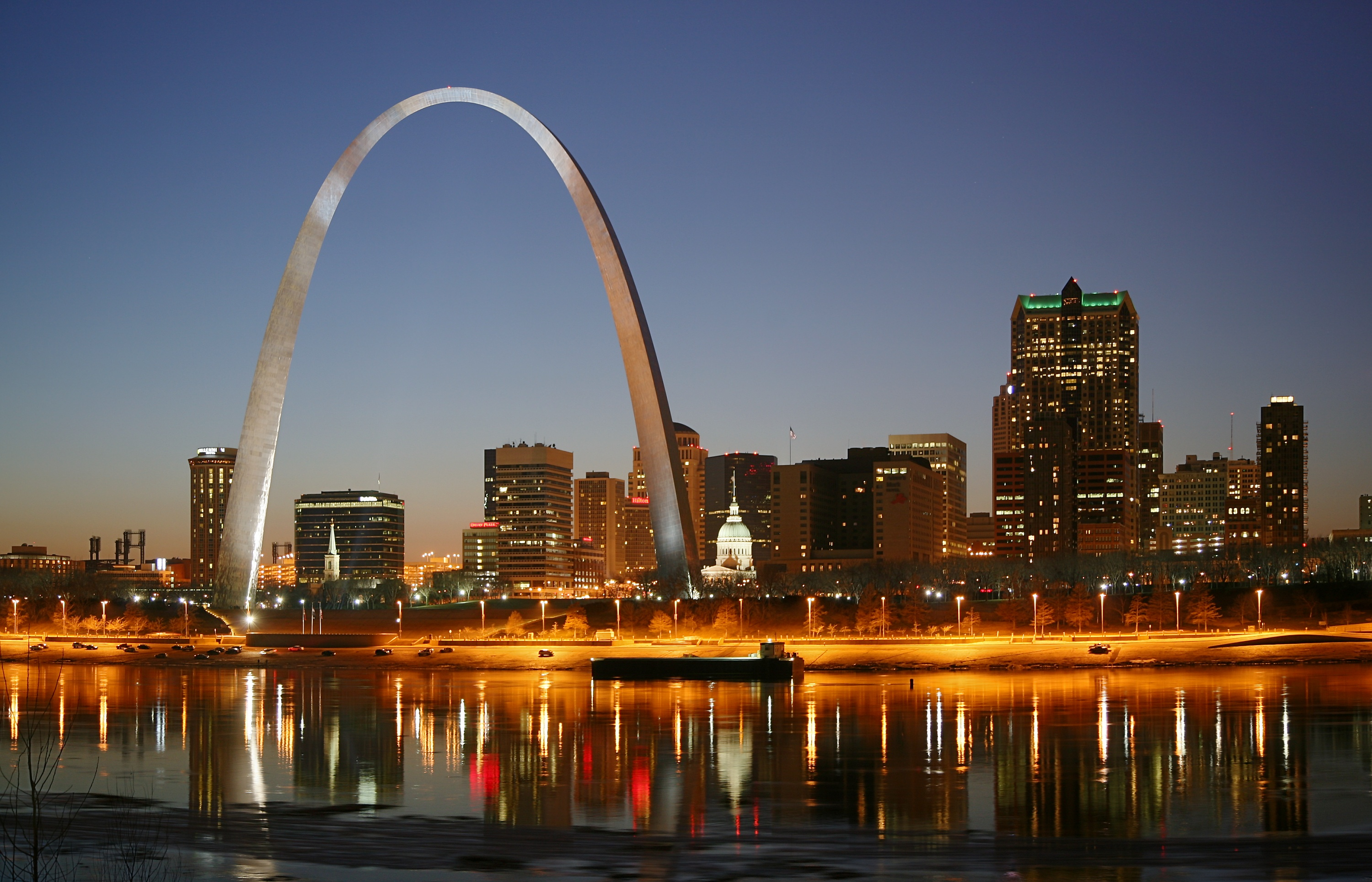
22 – St Louis, Missouri

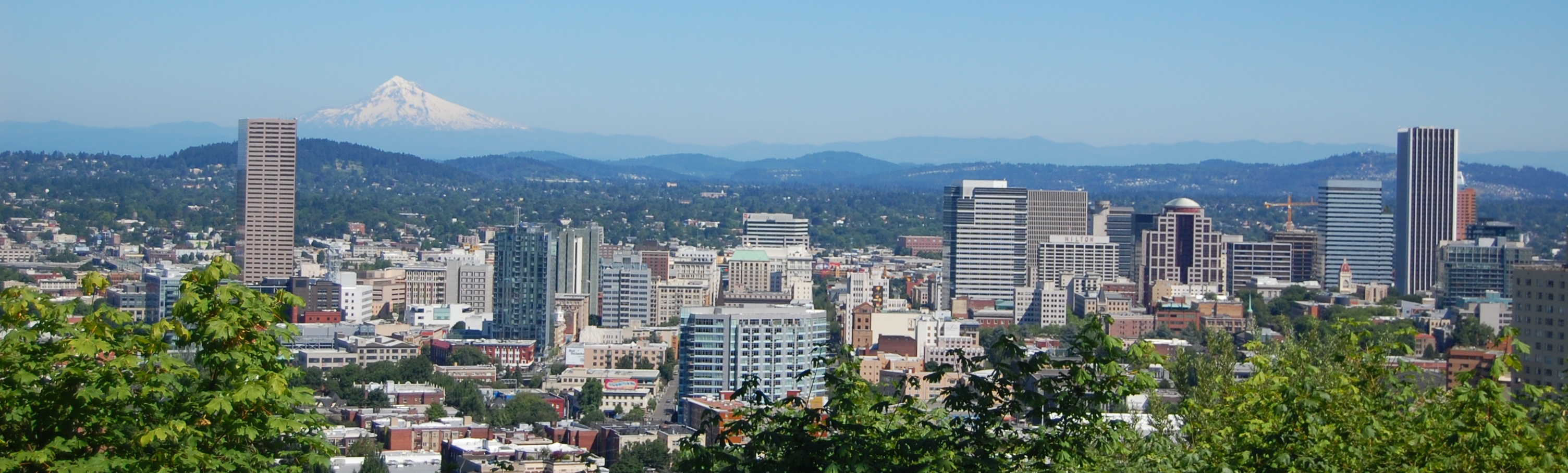
23 - Portland, Oregon

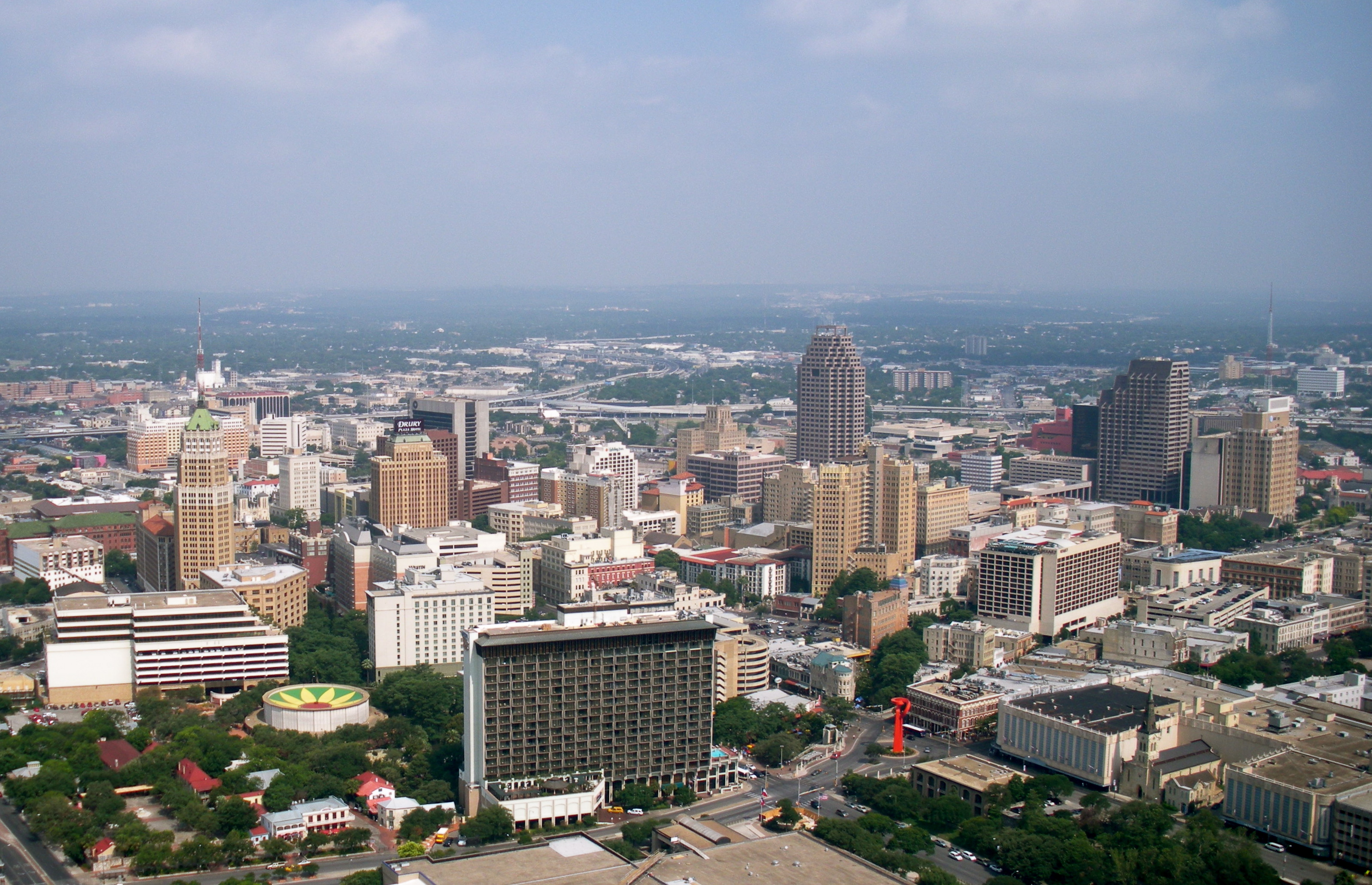
24 - San Antonio, Texas

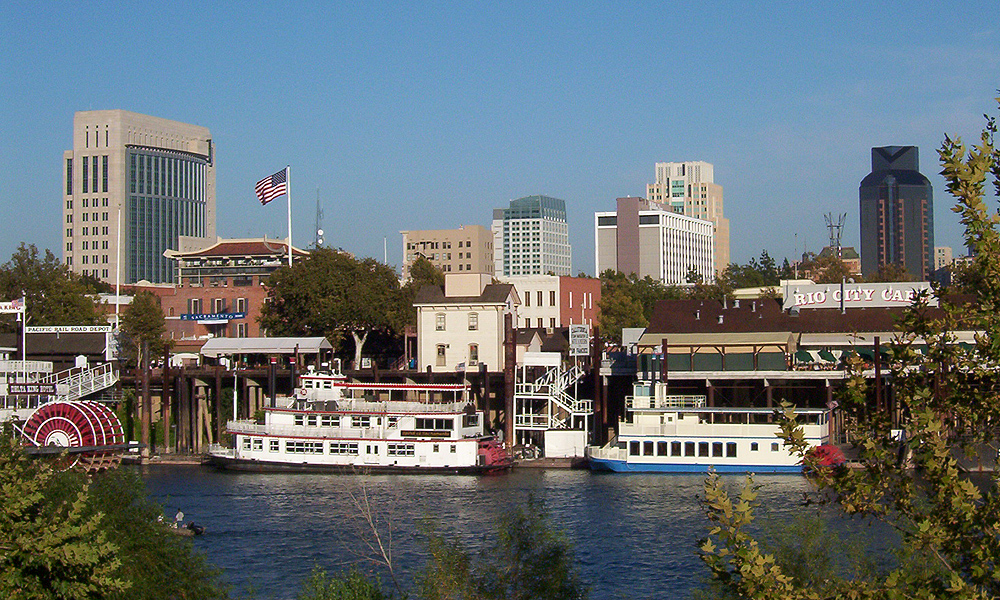
25 - Sacramento, California

== See also ==
- Outline of the United States
- Index of United States-related articles
- Geography
  - Human geography
    - Demography
- United States
  - United States Census Bureau
    - Demographics of the United States
      - US states and territories by population
      - US cities by population
- Office of Management and Budget
  - Statistical area (United States)
    - Combined statistical area (list)
    - Core-based statistical area (list)
      - Metropolitan statistical area (list, by GDP)
      - Micropolitan statistical area (list)
