= Nanhu =

Nanhu may refer to:

- Erhu (南胡, 二胡), a Chinese two-stringed bowed musical instrument
- Nanhu Mountain (南湖大山), 3,740 m-high mountain in Taiwan
- Nanhu District (南湖区), in Jiaxing, Zhejiang, China

Lakes (南湖)

- South Lake (Nanning), Guangxi
- South Lake (Wuhan), Hubei
- South Lake (Changchun), Jilin
- South Lake (Jiaxing), Zhejiang

Subdistricts (南湖街道)

- Nanhu Subdistrict, Cangzhou, in Yunhe District, Cangzhou, Hebei
- Nanhu Subdistrict, Huangzhou District, in Huanggang, Hubei
- Nanhu Subdistrict, Macheng, in Macheng City, Huanggang, Hubei
- Nanhu Subdistrict, Wuhan, in Wuchang District, Wuhan, Hubei
- Nanhu, Yueyang, in Yueyanglou District, Yueyang, Hunan
- Nanhu Subdistrict, Shenzhen, in Luohu District, Shenzhen, Guangdong
- Nanhu Subdistrict, Nanning, in Qingxiu District, Nanning, Guangxi
- Nanhu Subdistrict, Nanjing, in Jianye District, Nanjing, Jiangsu
- Nanhu Subdistrict, Changchun, in Chaoyang District, Changchun, Jilin
- Nanhu Subdistrict, Shenyang, in Heping District, Shenyang, Liaoning
- Nanhu Subdistrict, Jiaxing, in Nanhu District, Jiaxing, Zhejiang

Towns (南湖镇)

- Nanhu, Zhuanglang County, in Zhuanglang County, Gansu
- Nanhu, Rizhao, in Donggang District, Rizhao, Shandong

Townships (南湖乡)

- Nanhu Township, Xuancheng, in Xuanzhou District, Xuancheng, Anhui
- Nanhu Township, Minqin County, in Minqin County, Gansu
- Nanhu Township, Xinjiang, in Hami, Xinjiang

== See also ==
- Nanhu Lake (disambiguation)
