= Nanhu Lake =

Nanhu Lake may refer to the following lakes in China:

- South Lake (Jiaxing) (pinyin: Nán Hú)
- South Lake (Wuhan)
- Nanhu Lake, Ma'anshan

== See also ==
- Nanhu (disambiguation)
