= Southern Lakes (disambiguation) =

The Southern Lakes is a name given to an area of the southern South Island of New Zealand.

Southern Lakes may also refer to:

- Southern Lakes (electoral district), a former electoral district in Canada
- Mount Lorne-Southern Lakes, a current electoral district in Canada

== See also ==
- South Lake (disambiguation)
