= Lakes, Alaska =

Former CDP in Alaska, United States

- CDP
- Location in Matanuska-Susitna Borough and the state of Alaska

- Location within the state of Alaska
- Coordinates: 61°36′27″N 149°18′15″W
- Country: United States
- State: Alaska
- Borough: Matanuska-Susitna

Area
  - Total: 15.4 sq mi (39.8 km^{2})
  - Land: 13.7 sq mi (35.4 km^{2})
  - Water: 1.7 sq mi (4.5 km^{2})

Population (2010)
  - Total: 8,364
  - Density: 612/sq mi (236/km^{2})
- Time zone: UTC-9 (Alaska (AKST))
  - Summer (DST): UTC-8 (AKDT)
- Area code: 907
- FIPS code: 02-42832

Lakes was a census-designated place (CDP) in Matanuska-Susitna Borough, Alaska, United States. It was split in two CDPs for 2020 Census purposes: North Lakes and South Lakes. The area is part of the Anchorage, Alaska Metropolitan Statistical Area. At the 2010 census, the population was 8,364, up from 6,706 in 2000.

== Geography ==
Lakes is located at 61°36′27″N 149°18′15″W (61.607440, -149.304056) near Wasilla and Palmer.

According to the United States Census Bureau, the CDP has a total area of 15.4 square miles (40 km^{2}), of which, 13.6 square miles (35 km^{2}) of it is land and 1.7 square miles (4.4 km^{2}) of it (11.25%) is water.

There is public access to some of the lakes for which the CDP is named via the Finger Lakes State Recreation Site.

== Demographics ==
Historical population
Census	Pop.	Note	%±
2000	6,706		—
2010	8,364		24.7%
U.S. Decennial Census

Lakes first appeared on the 2000 U.S. census as a census-designated place (CDP).

As of the census of 2000, there were 6,706 people, 2,217 households, and 1,775 families residing in the CDP. The population density was 491.3 inhabitants per square mile (189.7/km^{2}). There were 2,329 housing units at an average density of 170.6 per square mile (65.9/km^{2}). The racial makeup of the CDP was 89.49% White, 0.60% Black or African American, 4.58% Native American, 0.54% Asian, 0.09% Pacific Islander, 0.55% from other races, and 4.16% from two or more races. 1.95% of the population were Hispanic or Latino of any race.

There were 2,217 households, out of which 46.0% had children under the age of 18 living with them, 67.9% were married couples living together, 7.9% had a female householder with no husband present, and 19.9% were non-families. 14.3% of all households were made up of individuals, and 2.8% had someone living alone who was 65 years of age or older. The average household size was 3.00 and the average family size was 3.32.

In the CDP, the population was spread out, with 33.1% under the age of 18, 6.6% from 18 to 24, 30.6% from 25 to 44, 24.9% from 45 to 64, and 4.8% who were 65 years of age or older. The median age was 35 years. For every 100 females, there were 102.7 males. For every 100 females age 18 and over, there were 101.8 males.

The median income for a household in the CDP was $63,250, and the median income for a family was $68,893. Males had a median income of $50,378 versus $30,675 for females. The per capita income for the CDP was $23,485. About 3.8% of families and 6.9% of the population were below the poverty line, including 6.3% of those under age 18 and 6.5% of those age 65 or over.
