= North Lakes, Alaska =

- Census-designated place
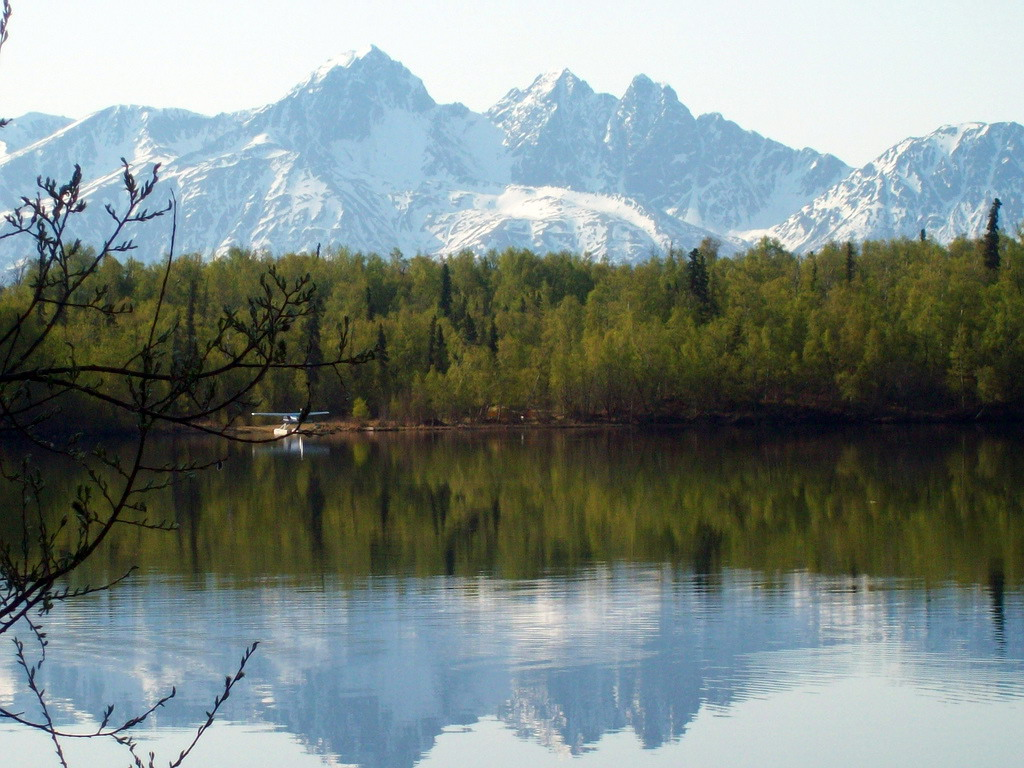
- Cottonwood Lake is one of a chain of lakes which run along the CDP's southeast corner.

- Location within Alaska
- Coordinates: 61°36′27″N 149°18′7″W
- Country: United States
- State: Alaska
- Borough: Matanuska-Susitna

Government
  - Borough mayor: Edna DeVries
  - State senators: Mike Shower (R); David Wilson (R)
  - State reps.: George Rauscher (R); Jesse Sumner (R)

Area
  - Total: 17.23 sq mi (44.62 km^{2})
  - Land: 15.48 sq mi (40.10 km^{2})
  - Water: 1.75 sq mi (4.52 km^{2})
- Elevation: 360 ft (110 m)

Population (2020)
  - Total: 9,450
  - Density: 610.3/sq mi (235.64/km^{2})
- Time zone: UTC-9 (Alaska (AKST))
  - Summer (DST): UTC-8 (AKDT)
- Area code: 907
- FIPS code: 02-55745

North Lakes is a census-designated place (CDP) in Matanuska-Susitna Borough, Alaska, United States. It was first listed as a CDP prior to the 2020 census, after the split of the former CDP of Lakes. As of the 2020 census, North Lakes had a population of 9,450. It is part of the Anchorage, Alaska Metropolitan Statistical Area.

== Geography ==
North Lakes is located northeast of Wasilla and west of Palmer; the CDP name refers to a chain of lakes in the community. It is bordered to the south by the South Lakes CDP.

According to the United States Census Bureau, the North Lakes CDP has a total area of 17.2 square miles (44.6 km^{2}), of which 15.5 square miles (40.1 km^{2}) are land and 1.7 square miles (4.5 km^{2}), or 10.12%, are water.

== Demographics ==
Historical population
Census	Pop.	Note	%±
2020	9,450		—
U.S. Decennial Census

=== 2020 census ===
As of the 2020 census, North Lakes had a population of 9,450. It was the second most populated CDP in the borough and the fourth largest in the state. The median age was 36.0 years. 27.8% of residents were under the age of 18 and 12.0% of residents were 65 years of age or older. For every 100 females there were 103.0 males, and for every 100 females age 18 and over there were 102.7 males age 18 and over.

94.7% of residents lived in urban areas, while 5.3% lived in rural areas.

There were 3,365 households in North Lakes, of which 37.6% had children under the age of 18 living in them. Of all households, 57.0% were married-couple households, 17.0% were households with a male householder and no spouse or partner present, and 18.8% were households with a female householder and no spouse or partner present. About 20.1% of all households were made up of individuals and 6.2% had someone living alone who was 65 years of age or older.

There were 3,661 housing units, of which 8.1% were vacant. The homeowner vacancy rate was 2.2% and the rental vacancy rate was 10.7%.

Racial composition as of the 2020 census
Race	Number	Percent
White	7,310	77.4%
Black or African American	75	0.8%
American Indian and Alaska Native	552	5.8%
Asian	169	1.8%
Native Hawaiian and Other Pacific Islander	21	0.2%
Some other race	163	1.7%
Two or more races	1,160	12.3%
Hispanic or Latino (of any race)	530	5.6%
