= Nanhu Township, Xinjiang =

Nanhu Township 南湖乡
- Township
- Location in Xinjiang
- Coordinates: 42°34′24″N 93°25′6″E
- Country: China
- Autonomous region: Xinjiang
- Prefecture-level city: Hami
- District: Yizhou District

Population (2020)
  - Total: 2,803
- Time zone: UTC+8 (CST)
- Area code: 902
- Number of pre-township divisions: 3

Nanhu Township (simplified Chinese: 南湖乡; traditional Chinese: 南湖鄉; pinyin: Nánhú Xiāng) is a township in Yizhou District, Hami, Xinjiang, China. As of 2020, Nanhu has jurisdiction over 3 pre-township level divisions (villages): Nanhu Village, Toptal Village and Hongshan Village (红山村).
