= South Lakes, Alaska =

- Census-designated place
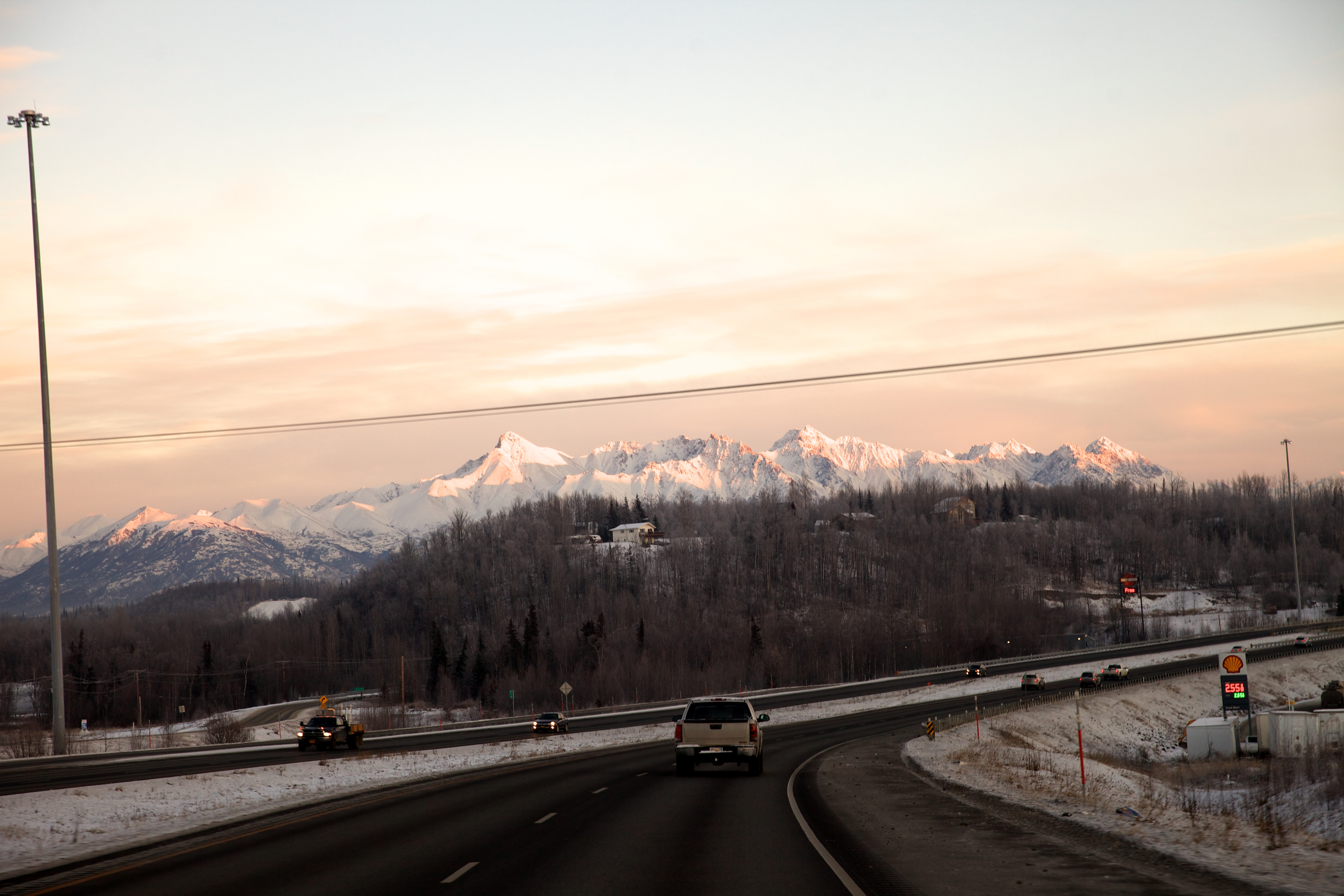
- Southbound George Parks Highway approaching the interchange with Fairview Loop Road and Hyer Road. The CDP's southern edge, where it borders with the Gateway CDP, is seen at left.

- Location within Alaska Location within North America
- Coordinates: 61°35′7″N 149°18′36″W
- Country: United States
- State: Alaska
- Borough: Matanuska-Susitna

Government
  - Borough mayor: Edna DeVries
  - State senators: Shelley Hughes (R); David Wilson (R)
  - State reps.: Jesse Sumner (R); Cathy Tilton (R)

Area
  - Total: 8.28 sq mi (21.45 km^{2})
  - Land: 7.81 sq mi (20.22 km^{2})
  - Water: 0.47 sq mi (1.23 km^{2})
- Elevation: 340 ft (100 m)

Population (2020)
  - Total: 5,229
  - Density: 669.7/sq mi (258.59/km^{2})
- Time zone: UTC-9 (Alaska (AKST))
  - Summer (DST): UTC-8 (AKDT)
- Area code: 907
- FIPS code: 02-72135

South Lakes is a census-designated place (CDP) in Matanuska-Susitna Borough, Alaska, United States. It was first listed as a CDP prior to the 2020 census, after the split of the former CDP of Lakes. As of the 2020 census, South Lakes had a population of 5,229. It is part of the Anchorage, Alaska Metropolitan Statistical Area.

== Geography ==
South Lakes is located east of Wasilla and west of Palmer; the CDP name refers to a chain of lakes forming the northern edge of the community. It is bordered to the north by the North Lakes CDP.

According to the United States Census Bureau, the South Lakes CDP has a total area of 8.3 square miles (21.4 km^{2}), of which 7.8 square miles (20.2 km^{2}) are land and 0.46 square miles (1.2 km^{2}), or 5.72%, are water.

== Demographics ==
Historical population
Census	Pop.	Note	%±
2020	5,229		—
U.S. Decennial Census

=== 2020 census ===
As of the 2020 census, South Lakes had a population of 5,229. It was the sixth most populated CDP in the borough. The median age was 37.3 years. 26.0% of residents were under the age of 18 and 14.7% of residents were 65 years of age or older. For every 100 females there were 101.9 males, and for every 100 females age 18 and over there were 101.7 males age 18 and over.

99.2% of residents lived in urban areas, while 0.8% lived in rural areas.

There were 1,886 households in South Lakes, of which 34.7% had children under the age of 18 living in them. Of all households, 54.6% were married-couple households, 18.2% were households with a male householder and no spouse or partner present, and 19.4% were households with a female householder and no spouse or partner present. About 22.3% of all households were made up of individuals and 6.2% had someone living alone who was 65 years of age or older.

There were 2,055 housing units, of which 8.2% were vacant. The homeowner vacancy rate was 2.8% and the rental vacancy rate was 7.7%.

Racial composition as of the 2020 census
Race	Number	Percent
White	4,168	79.7%
Black or African American	65	1.2%
American Indian and Alaska Native	271	5.2%
Asian	74	1.4%
Native Hawaiian and Other Pacific Islander	12	0.2%
Some other race	67	1.3%
Two or more races	572	10.9%
Hispanic or Latino (of any race)	236	4.5%
