= South Lake (Wuhan) =

Lake in Wuhan, China

- Nan Hu
- 南湖 (Chinese)
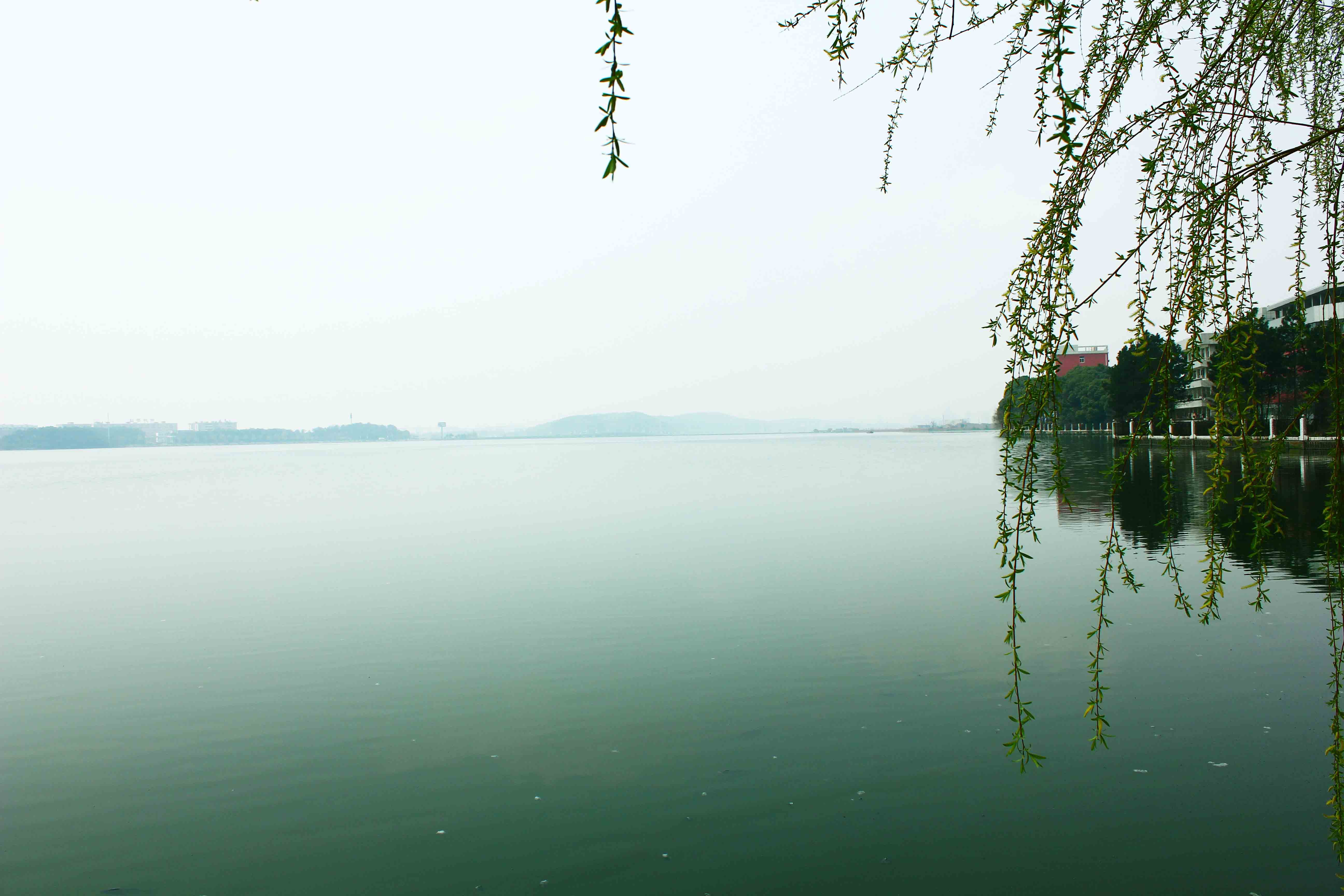

- Location within China Location within Hubei
- Location: Hongshan District/Jiangxia District, Wuhan, Hubei
- Coordinates: 30°29′16″N 114°21′38″E
- Part of: Yangtze River Basin
- Basin countries: China
- Surface area: > 5 km^{2} (2 sq mi)
- Surface elevation: 10 metres (33 ft)

South Lake
- Chinese: 南湖
- Literal meaning: "South Lake"
Transcriptions
Standard Mandarin
- Hanyu Pinyin: Nán Hú

South Lake (Chinese: 武汉南湖) is a subtropical shallow freshwater lake located in Nanhu Subdistrict, in the southern suburbs of Wuchang, Wuhan, Hubei Province, China. It has an average depth of 1.6 metres, lake bottom elevation 18 m, the width of the lake is about 15.4 km long, the length of the lake is about 5.4 km wide, area of 5 km².

== Water pollution ==
The area around the lake is densely populated. Since the 1980s, with the development of industry, and the dramatic increase in population, South Lake's water quality has gradually deteriorated, and the eutrophication process has intensified.
