= Mud Volcanoes State Nature Reserve =

Reserve in Azerbaijan

- Mud Volcanoes Group of Baku and Absheron Peninsula State Nature Reserve
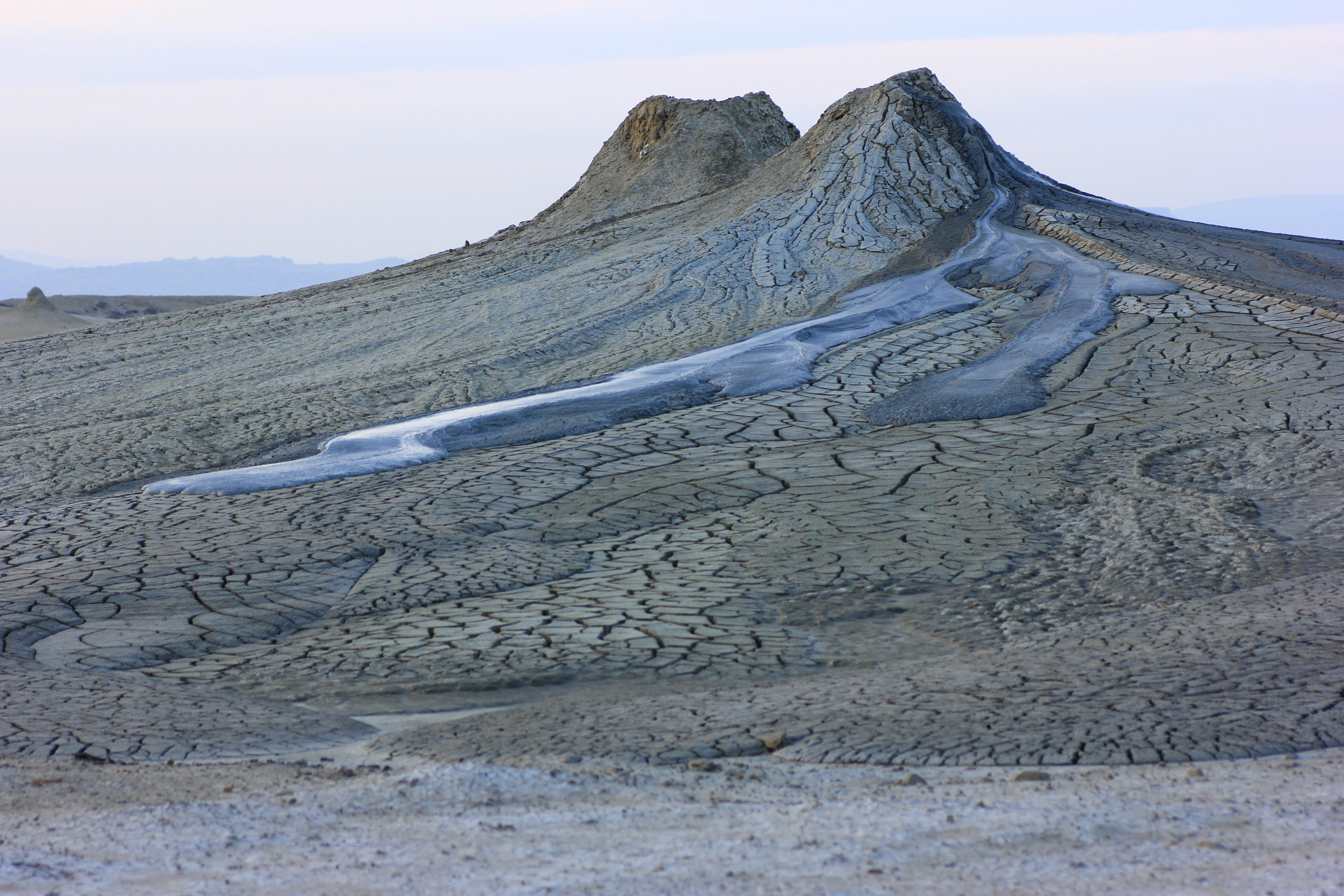
- Interactive map of Mud Volcanoes State Nature Reserve
- Location: Absheron Peninsula
- Nearest city: Baku
- Area: 12.32284 ha (30.4504 acres)
- Established: August 15, 2007
- Owner: Ministry of Ecology and Natural Resources
- Website: eco.gov.az/index.php?pg=110

Mud Volcanoes State Nature Reserve or in its full name Mud Volcanoes Group of Baku and Absheron Peninsula State Nature Reserve is a state reserve located in the Absheron region of Azerbaijan. The area of the reserve is 12,322.84 hectares and 43 mud volcanoes are protected here. The world's largest mud volcano Toraghay is also protected in this reserve.

== History ==
The Republic of Azerbaijan has the world's highest concentration of mud volcanoes. More than 400 mud volcanoes have been registered in the country, accounting for approximately half of the global total.

The State Nature Reserve of Mud Volcanoes was established by the Decree of the President of the Republic of Azerbaijan No. 2315 dated August 15, 2007, on the territory of part of the mud volcanoes located on the Baku and Absheron peninsulas. According to the relevant Decree, the main goal of the creation of the State Nature Reserve is the reduction of anthropogenic effects on mud volcanoes, the prevention of intensive construction works in the area and the construction of residential buildings in the zones where volcanoes are likely to erupt. After that, the territory of 43 mud volcanoes in an area of 12,322.84 ha was declared a reserve by Decree No. 294 of the Cabinet of Ministers of the Republic of Azerbaijan dated September 29, 2011.

== Activity ==
Two priority areas have been identified for the reserve’s operations:

- To carry out the protection of natural areas in order to preserve the natural state of the volcanic landscape, natural complexes and objects.
- Organize scientific research and carry out environmental monitoring.

Employees of the reserve maintain the natural state of the volcanic landscape by regularly conducting scientific stationary observations in 43 mud volcanoes with special protection status, forecasting ecological conditions, preparing the scientific basis of nature protection, studying the dynamics of volcanic processes, and also ensuring their protection from anthropogenic interference.

== Mud volcanoes in the reserve ==
- Guzdak Bozdaghi mud volcano
- Ayrantoken mud volcano
- Goturdag mud volcano
- Kirdagh
- Pilpili Garadag
- Torpagli Akhtarma
- Garadag Akhtarmasi
- Bandovan mud volcano
- Aghzibir mud volcano
- Otman Bozdag mud volcano
- Khara Zira or Bulla
- Gara su island mud volcano
- Zanbil
- Gil Island
- Chigil
- Sengi Mughan
- Chapilmish
- Gulbakht-Sarinca
- Shor bulag
- Keiraki mud volcano
- Qirmeki mud volcano
- Cheyildagh
- Pire
- Çeyildağ
- Pirekeshkul
- Shekikhan group
- Aghdam group
- Suleymanakhtarma
- Kichik Kanizadag mud volcano
- Boyanata-Saridash
- Durandagh
- Toragay mud volcano
- Oyukh
- Garakhura
- Aghtirme
- Amjak-amjak
- Boransiz-Culge
- Gilinj
- Aghnohur
- Gullutepe
- Cheilakhtarma
- Gotur
- Gelenderakhtarma
- Shahgaya

== See also ==
- Mud volcano
- Mud volcanoes in Azerbaijan
