= Snider Peak =

Dacitic dome in Alaska, United States

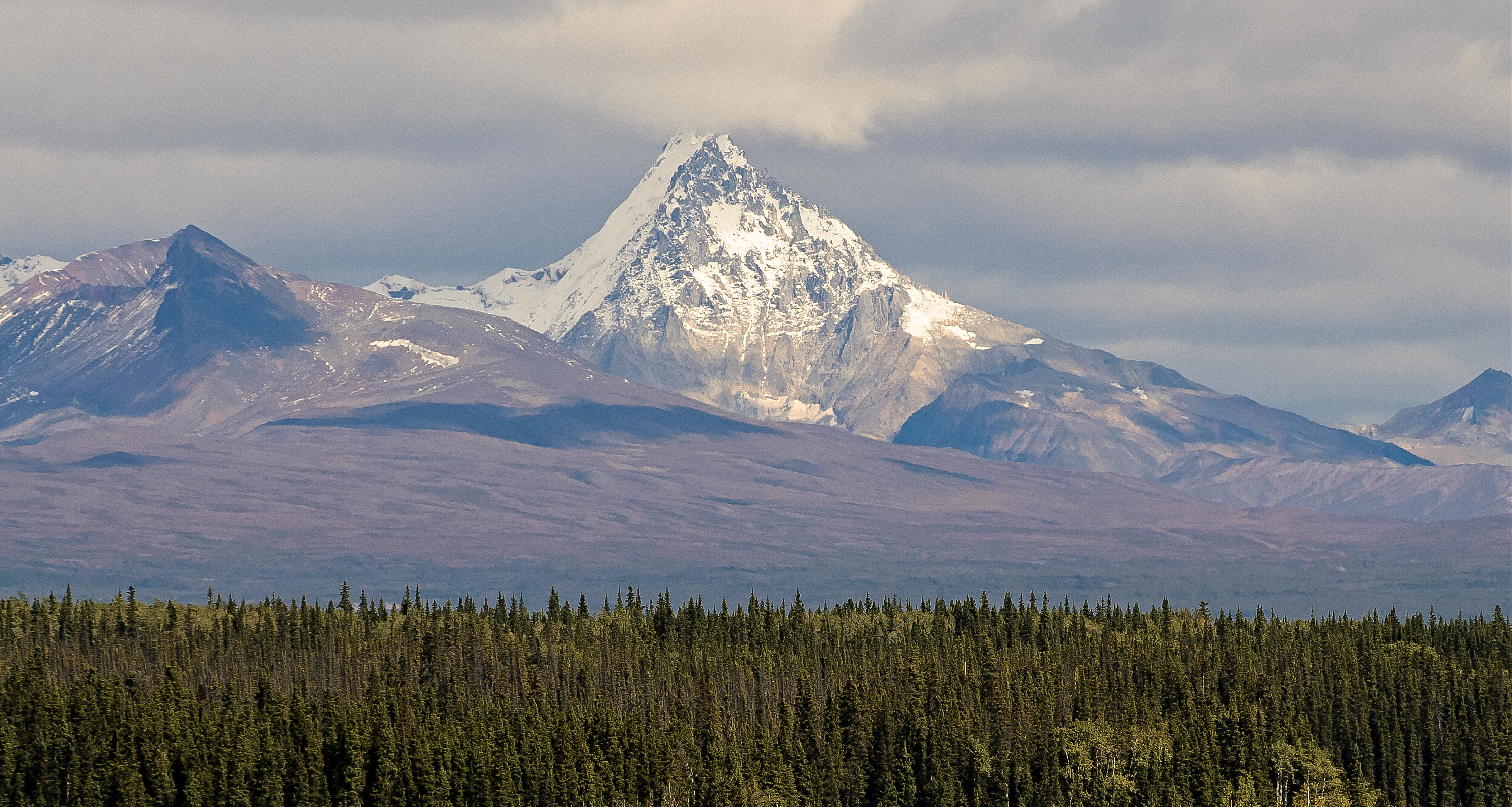
- Snider Peak seen from Richardson Highway

Highest point
- Elevation: 8,250 ft (2,510 m)
- Prominence: 1,200 ft (370 m)
- Parent peak: Mount Drum
- Isolation: 3.02 mi (4.86 km)
- Coordinates: 62°04′05″N 144°37′57″W

Geography
- Location within Alaska
- Interactive map of Snider Peak
- Location: Wrangell-St. Elias National Park; Copper River Census Area; Alaska, United States
- Parent range: Wrangell Mountains
- Topo map: USGS Gulkana A-2

Geology
- Rock type: Dacite

Snider Peak is an 8,250-foot (2,515 meter) dacitic dome summit located in the Wrangell Mountains, in the U.S. state of Alaska. The peak is situated in Wrangell-St. Elias National Park and Preserve, 30 mi (48 km) east of Glennallen, and 3 mi (5 km) south of Mount Drum which is the nearest higher peak. Precipitation runoff from the mountain drains into the Dadina and Nadina Rivers which are both tributaries of the Copper River. The peak's name may have been the name of an early prospector as reported in 1903 by the US Geological Survey.

== Climate ==
Based on the Köppen climate classification, Snider Peak is located in a subarctic climate zone with long, cold, snowy winters, and mild summers. Weather fronts coming off the Gulf of Alaska are forced upwards by the Wrangell Mountains (orographic lift), causing precipitation in the form of rainfall and snowfall. Temperatures can drop below −20 °F with wind chill factors below −30 °F. The months May through June offer the most favorable weather for viewing and climbing.

== Gallery ==
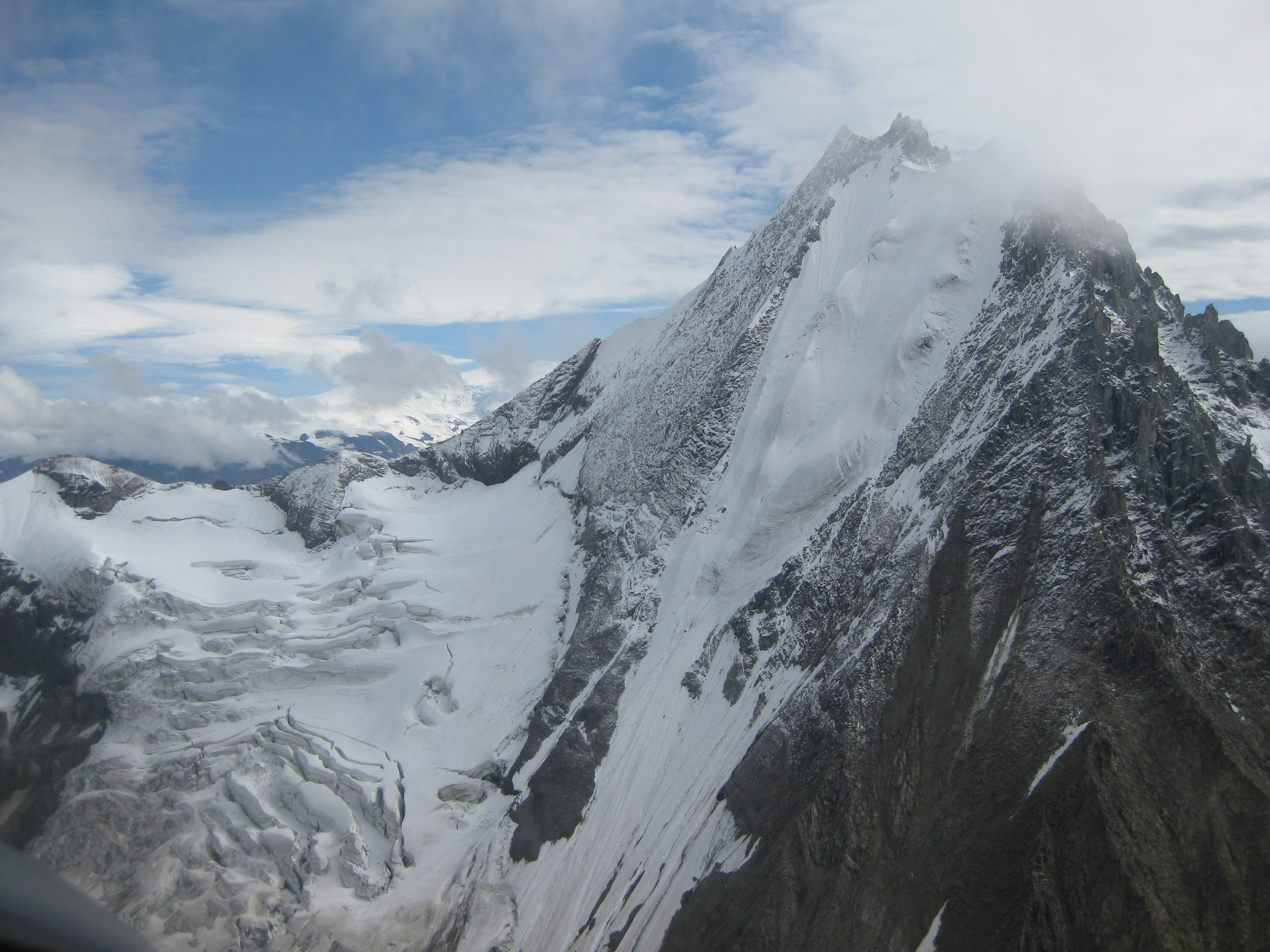
Snider Peak aerial

== See also ==
- List of mountain peaks of Alaska
- Geography of Alaska
