= Klawasi group =

Cluster of mud volcanoes in Alaska, United States

Coordinates: 62.0584°N 145.2245°W

Location of Klawasi mud volcanoes in Alaska

The Klawasi group is a cluster of three large mud volcanoes on the western flank of Mount Drum, a Pleistocene stratovolcano in the Wrangell Mountains of east-central Alaska in the United States. The cluster includes the Upper Klawasi, the Lower Klawasi and the Shrub.

The volcanoes eject mostly warm mud, water, and CO_{2}; the carbon dioxide is known to affect the flora and fauna of the area.
