= Devil's Woodyard =

Coordinates: 10°15′51.6″N 61°18′17.5″W

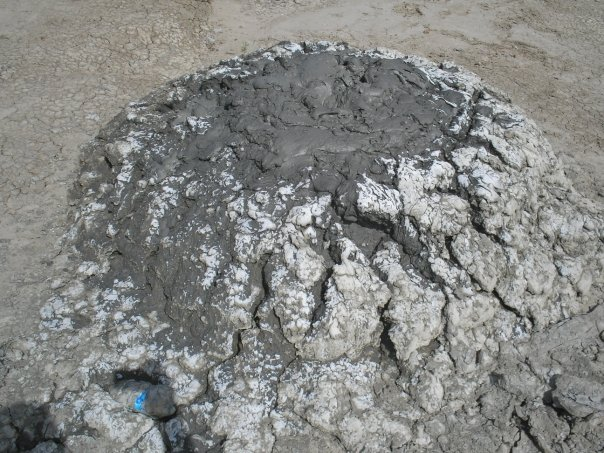
One of the larger vents

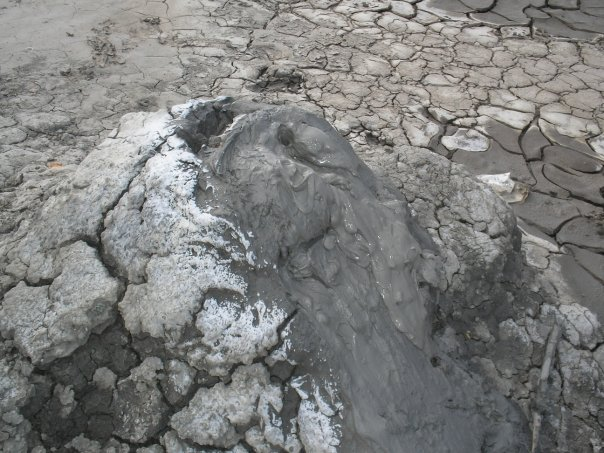
A freshly erupted vent (Dec, 2007)

Devil's Woodyard is one of the most visited locations of Trinidad's many mud volcanoes. Located in Hindustan in New Grant near Princes Town, the series of several vents appeared in 1852. As legend goes: "A relatively young volcanic site got its name after its first eruption in 1852. Which shook the entire village and felled the tall trees and frightened the Amerindian villagers. Villagers at the time believed that the devil had come from beneath the earth to fell the woods. The mounds of earth which occasionally bubble and hiss continue to amaze visitors of the site."

== 2018 activity ==
The mud volcanoes became active again in February, 2018, with an initial eruption on the 12th, followed by two more on the 13th.
