= Mount Drum =

Volcano in Alaska, United States

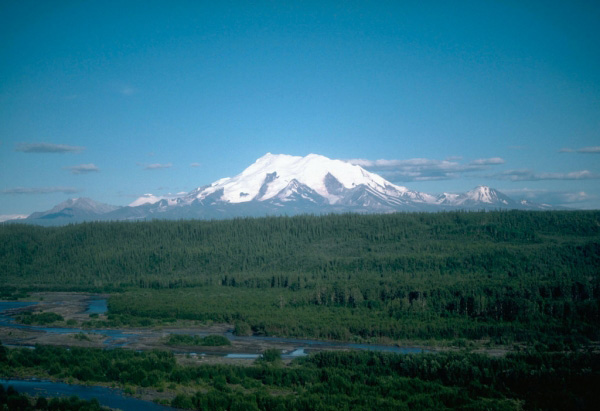
- Mount Drum from the northwest

Highest point
- Elevation: 12,010 ft (3,660 m)
- Prominence: 6,710 ft (2,050 m)
- Listing: North America prominent peaks 91st
- Coordinates: 62°06′58″N 144°38′16″W

Geography
- Location within Alaska
- Interactive map of Mount Drum
- Location: Wrangell-St. Elias National Park and Preserve, Alaska, U.S.
- Parent range: Wrangell Mountains
- Topo map: USGS Gulkana A-2

Climbing
- First ascent: 1954 by Heinrich Harrer, Keith Hart, George Schaller

Mount Drum is a stratovolcano in the Wrangell Mountains of east-central Alaska in the United States. It is located at the extreme western end of the Wrangells, 18 miles (29 km) west-southwest of Mount Sanford and the same distance west-northwest of Mount Wrangell. It lies just inside the western boundary of Wrangell-Saint Elias National Park and Preserve and is 25 miles (40 km) east of the Copper River.

== Geography ==
Standing near the low valley of the Copper River, Mount Drum is notable for its large local relief. For example, its south face rises 6,000 feet (1,830 m) over the head of the Nadina Glacier in only 1.6 miles (2.6 km). Its west slopes rise 9,000 feet (2,743 m) over the tundra in only 10 miles (16 km), and 11,000 feet (3,353 m) over the Copper River in only 25 miles (40 km). These numbers are comparable to better-known stratovolcanoes like Mount Rainier and Mount Shasta. However Mount Drum is somewhat overshadowed by its much higher neighbor Mount Sanford, which is also in Alaska.

== Geology ==
Mount Drum was active between 650,000 and 240,000 years ago. Late in that period, various separate dacitic domes were formed in a rough circle around the current summit at a radius about 4 miles (6 km); one such dome is the current Snider Peak (8,250 ft or 2,515 m) to the south of the main peak. After the constructive phase,

... paroxysmal explosive activity, probably from the central vent area, destroyed the south half of the stratovolcano and deposited ~7 km^{3} of hot and cold avalanche debris over an area >200 km^{2}.

The effects of this explosive phase can still be seen in the particularly steep south face of Mount Drum above the Nadina Glacier.

Mount Drum is flanked on the west by the Shrub and Klawasi mud volcanoes. In historic times, the only activity in the vicinity of Drum has been mud and gas emitted from this group.

== History ==
=== Naming ===
Named in 1885 by Lieutenant Allen, U.S. Army, for Adjutant General Richard Coulter Drum (1825-1909), who entered the army in 1846, served in the Mexican–American War, participated in an expedition against the Sioux Indians in 1856, and became a Brigadier General during the American Civil War.

=== Climbing ===
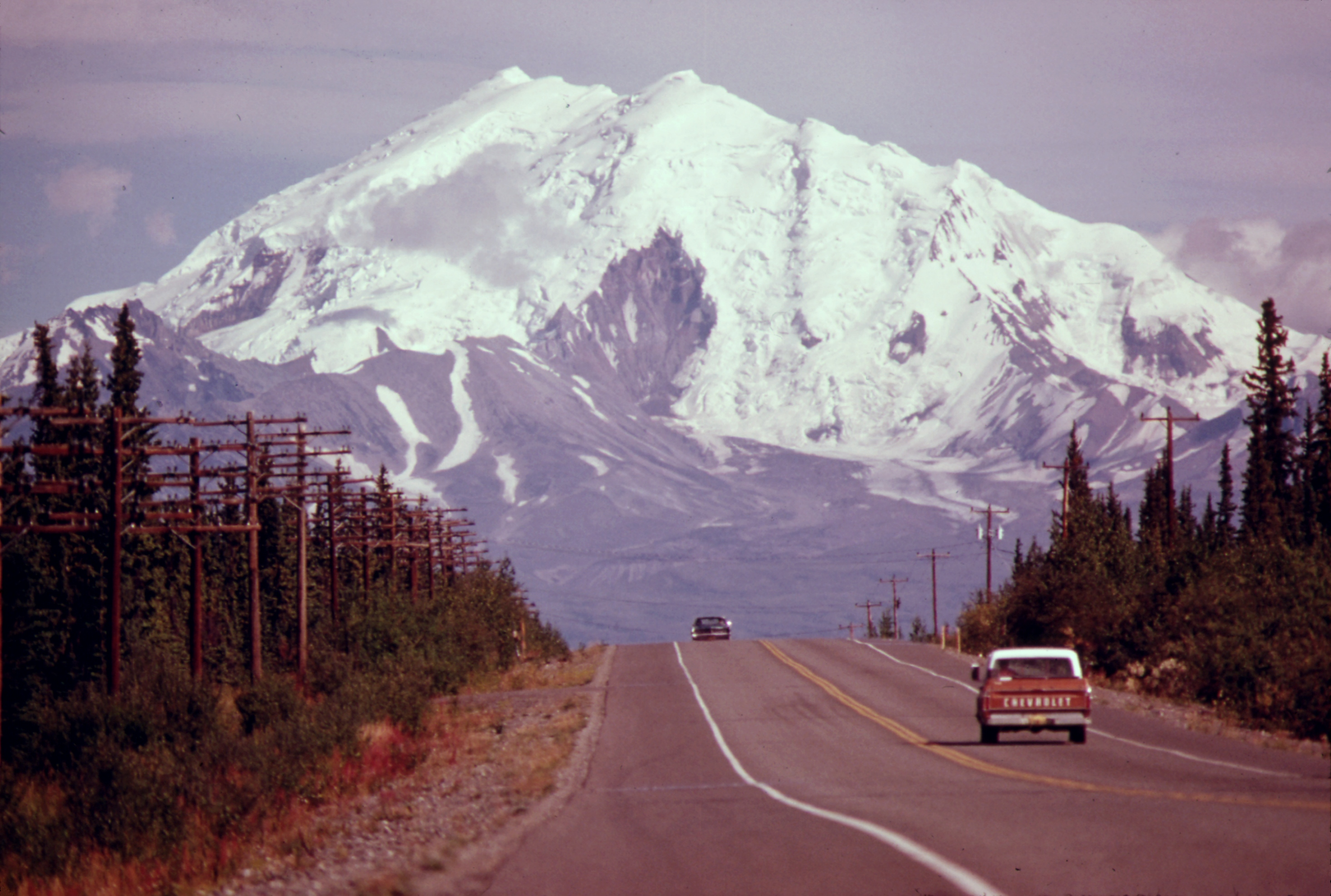
Eastbound travelers along the eastern reaches of the Glenn Highway enjoy prominent views of Mount Drum. This photo was taken in the Glennallen vicinity in 1974.

Mount Drum was first climbed on June 4, 1954 by noted Austrian mountaineer Heinrich Harrer, with Keith Hart and George Schaller, via the North Ridge. Heinz Allemann and Niklaus Lötscher made the second ascent on August 26, 1968, via the Southwest Ridge. The latter is the current standard route, and is rated Alaska Grade 2+.

== See also ==
- List of mountain peaks of North America
  - List of mountain peaks of the United States
    - List of mountain peaks of Alaska
- List of Ultras of the United States
- List of volcanoes in the United States
