= Mud volcanoes in Azerbaijan =

Mud volcano

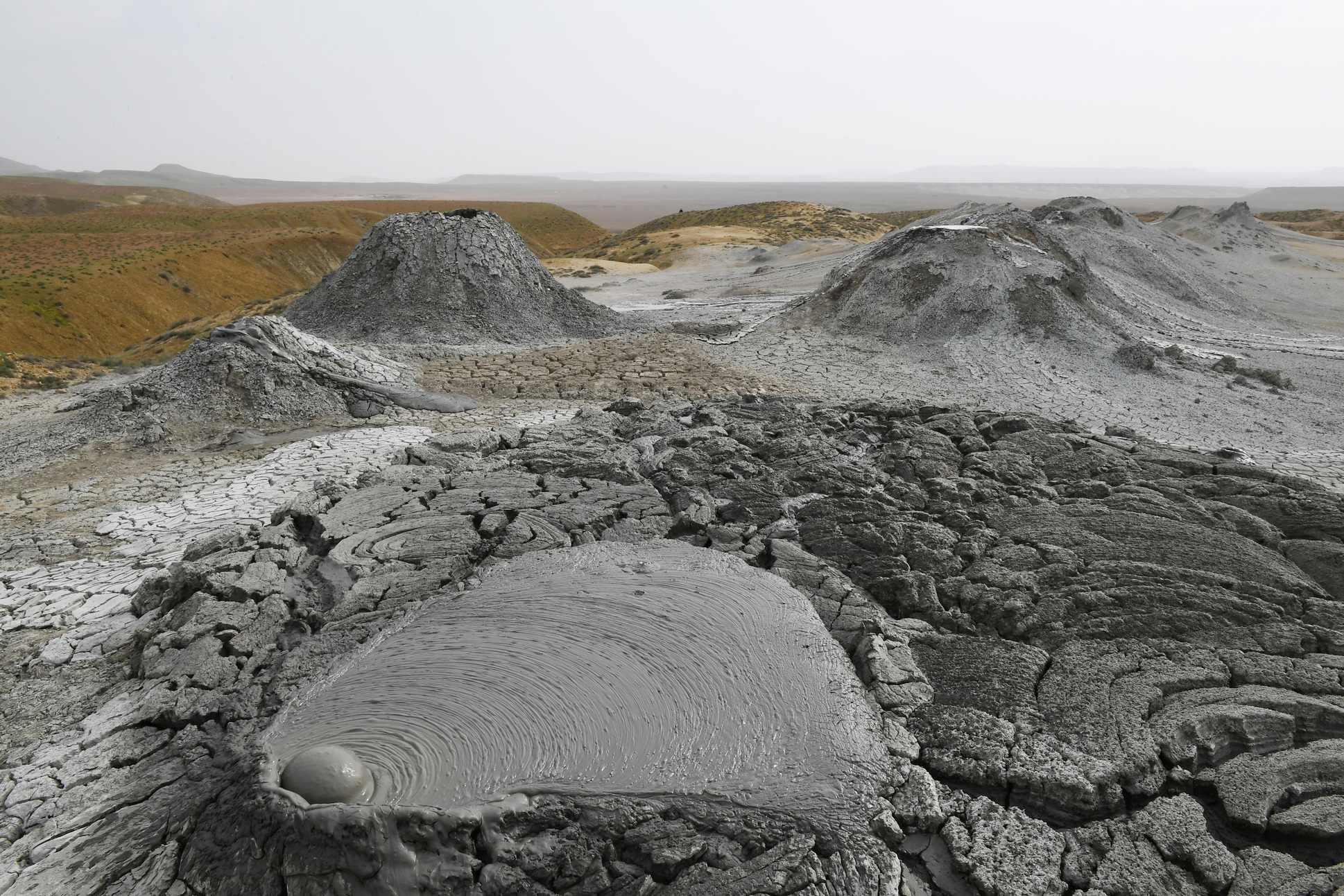
Mud volcano in Absheron District

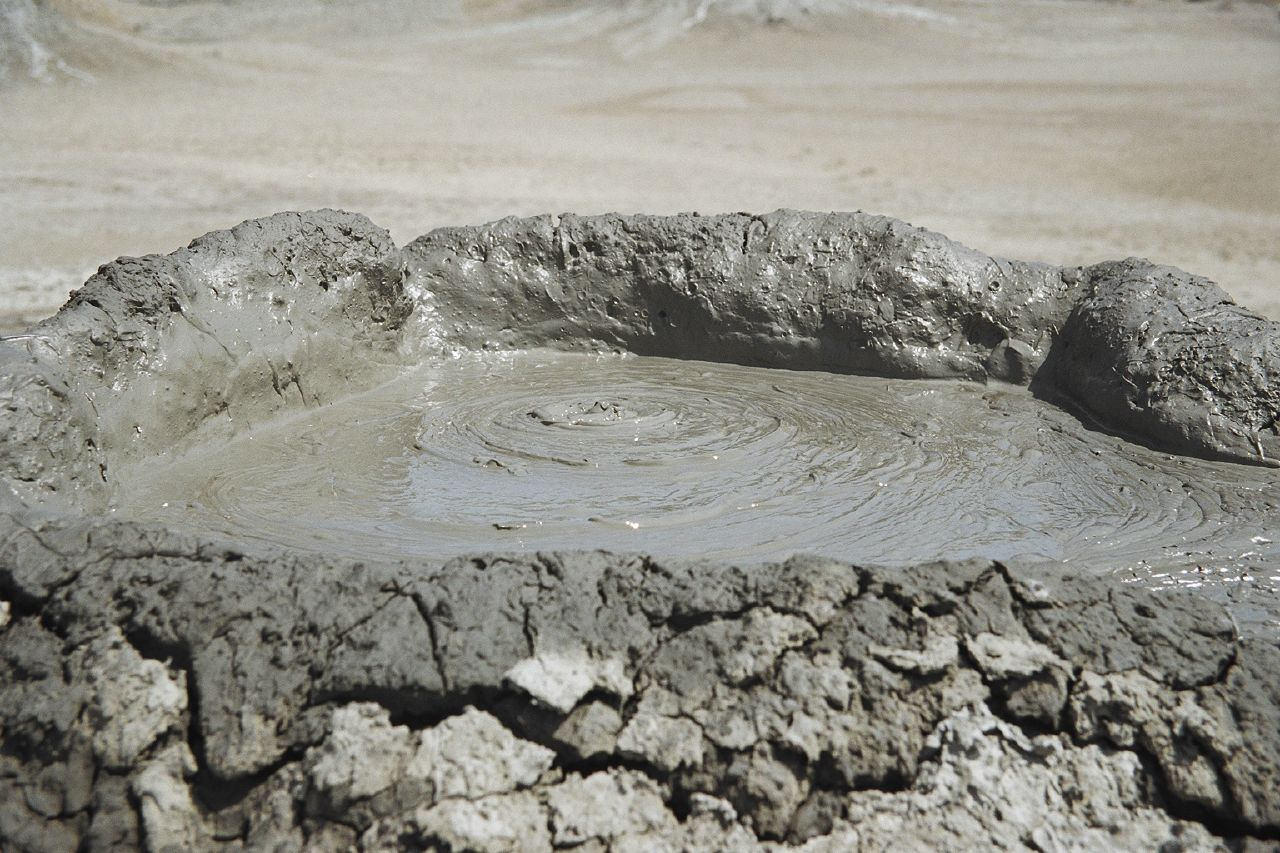
Mud volcano in Gobustan

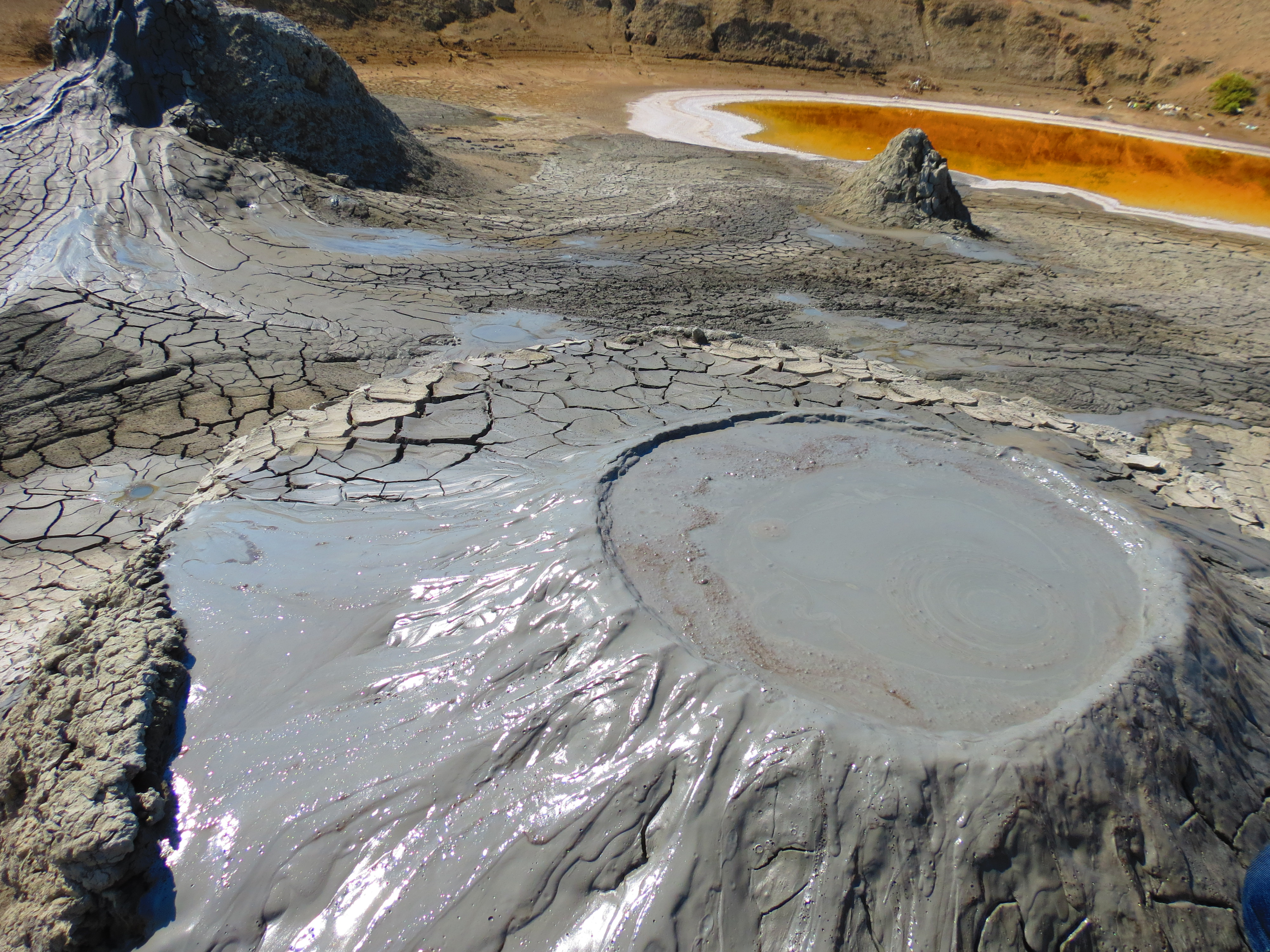
Mud volcano in Gobustan State Historical and Cultural Reserve

Azerbaijan has the world’s highest concentration of mud volcanoes, primarily situated in the eastern part of the country and the adjacent waters of the Caspian Sea. About half of the world’s 700 mud volcanoes are located in the Republic of Azerbaijan.

== Description ==
Mud volcanoes are a distinctive natural phenomenon in Azerbaijan, formed by the release of pressurized gas, water, and mud from deep within the Earth's crust. These geological formations occur both on land and beneath the sea, with their activity visible across sedimentary layers of different geological ages. More than 140 mud volcanoes are located on the floor of the Caspian Sea, and eight islands of the Baku Archipelago are of mud-volcanic origin.

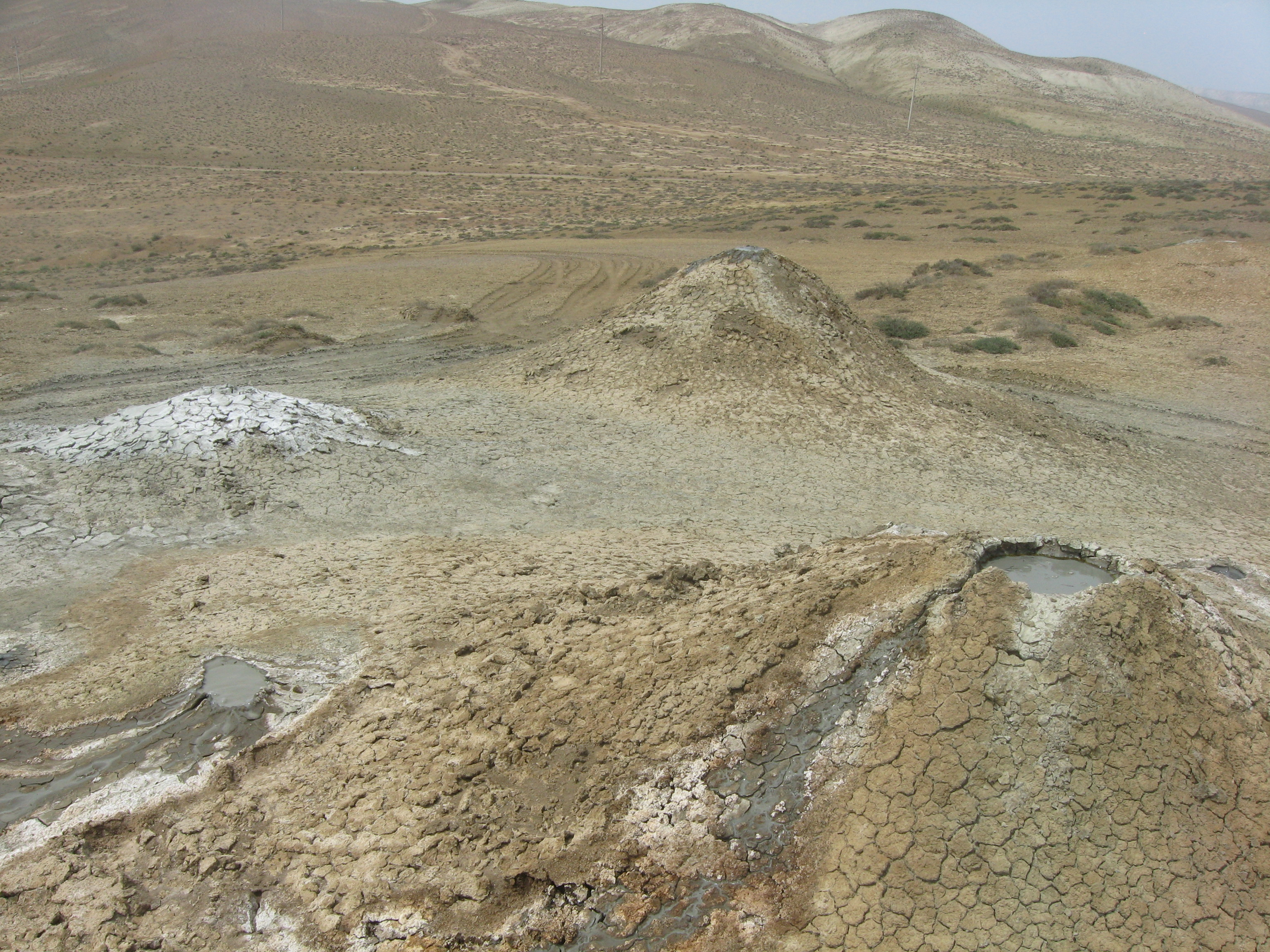
Mud volcanoes in Azerbaijan

About 200 eruptions have occurred at 50 volcanoes in the region since 1810. These eruptions are accompanied by powerful explosions and underground rumbling. Gases emerge from the deepest layers of the Earth and often ignite immediately, with flames reaching up to 1,000 meters at the Garasu volcano. The Toragay volcano erupted six times between 1841 and 1950.

Mud volcanoes are closely associated with hydrocarbon fields, and rich oil and gas deposits occur in areas of mud-volcanic activity, including Lokbatan, Garadagh, Neft Dashlari, Mishovdagh, and others.

NASA scientists studying Mars observed that some upland landforms on the planet resemble terrestrial mud volcanoes, and they use mud volcanoes on Earth, particularly those in Azerbaijan, as analogs for interpreting these Martian features.

Volcanic mud is used as a raw material in the chemical and construction industries, as well as in pharmacology. In 2007, the Mud Volcanoes State Nature Reserve was created on the Absheron Peninsula. In June 2024, the Mud Volcanoes Tourism Complex opened within the Gobustan State Historical and Cultural Reserve.

== Volcanoes ==
The Gotur Dag volcano, located 70 km from Baku, is 150 m (492 ft) tall with a depth of 20 m (66 ft). Its last eruptions occurred in 1966 and in 1970. The overall volume of breccia is about 530×10^{6} m^{3} (19×10^{9} cu ft).

Bahar volcano is located 55 km from Baku, with a height of 45.0 m (147.6 ft). The last eruption was detected in 1993. Lokbatan volcano is located 15.0 km (9.3 mi) from Baku. Several eruptions were recorded in the 19th century, and the most recent took place in 2001.

The Ayranteken volcano is one of the most active volcanoes in Azerbaijan. Located 65 km from Baku, many eruptions are accompanied by underground explosions and huge flames. The volcano reaches 190 meters. Its first eruptions are dated 1964 up to 1990. Near the volcano, 800 m length cracks can be found. Breccia of this volcano covers 805 hectares.

The 23 September 2018 eruption of Otman Bozdag produced cracks reaching depths of up to 80 m. Flames reached heights of 200–300 m, and the fissured area covered approximately 5 hectares. The last eruption of the Moose volcano occurred in 1970, when flames rose to heights of up to 1 km and local seismic activity was recorded.

On July 4, 2021, at 21:51 local time, an 8-minute long mud volcano eruption on Dashli ada in the Caspian Sea, located 10 km from an oil platform off the coast of Azerbaijan, caused a massive explosion and fireball. The flames reached heights of 500 meters and were visible across the region, including from Baku 74 km to the north. There were no reports of injuries or damage to any oil platforms. It was speculated to either have been the eruption of a mud volcano, or the explosion of a gas pipeline. However, scientists confirmed that the explosion came from a mud volcano called 'Makarov Bank', and occurred near the Umid gas field, where there are both gas pipelines and natural pockets of compressed gas, as are commonly found in the Caspian Sea. The most recent previous volcanic eruption on the island was recorded in 1945, and the one preceding it in 1920.
