= Runaruna Mud Volcano =

- Location within Northland Region
- Coordinates: 35°18′35.2″S 173°20′42.2″E
- Country: New Zealand
- Region: Northland Region
- District: Far North District

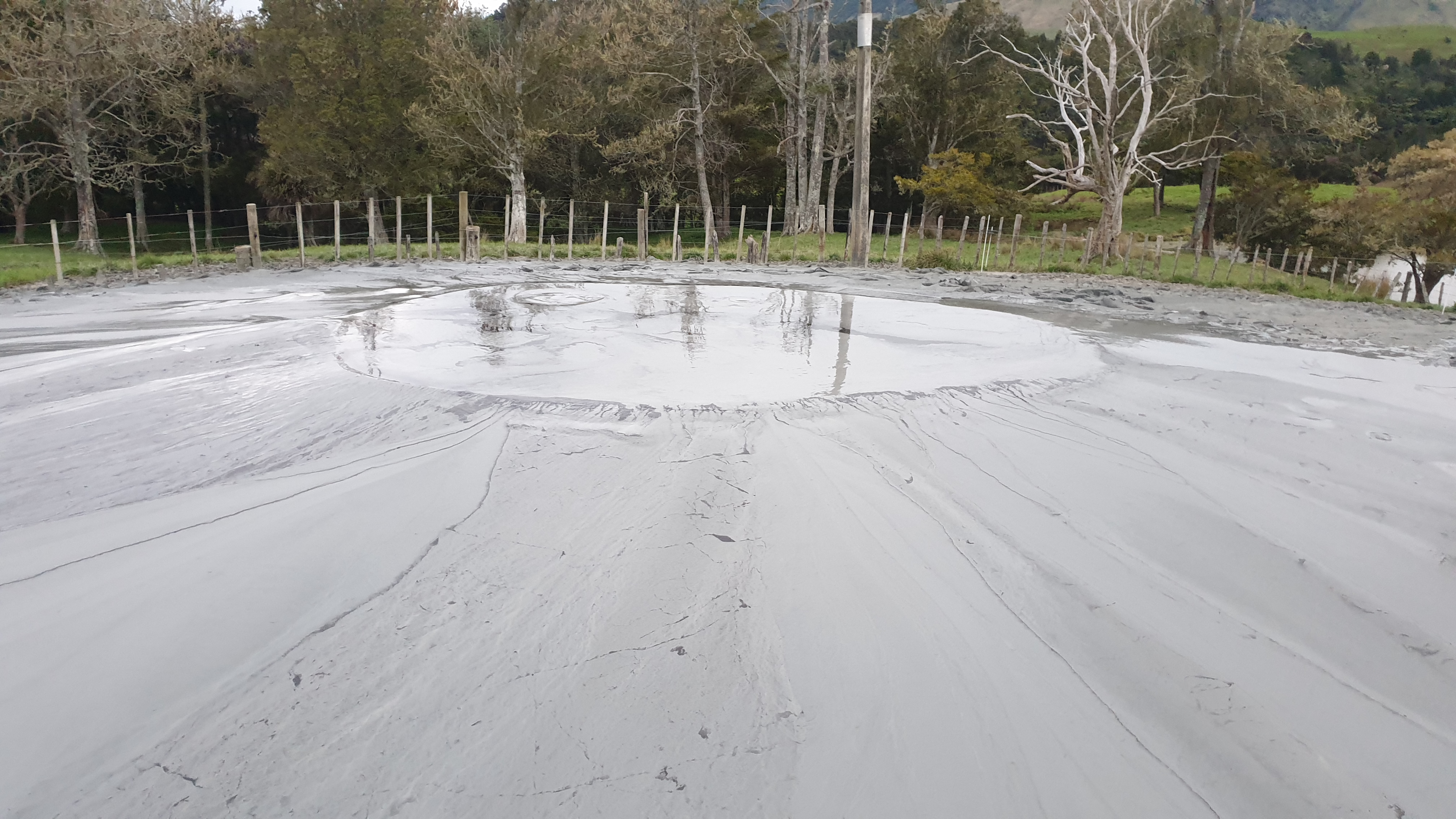
Runaruna Mud Volcano

Runaruna Mud Volcano as a distinct and true mud volcano landform is considered a national geological place of interest in New Zealand. Several geological processes may cause the formation of mud volcanoes including elsewhere in New Zealand geothermal mud pools or mudpots. It is located just southwest of Broadwood on private property.
