= Pirgel =

Coordinates: 27°59′5″N 60°29′00″E

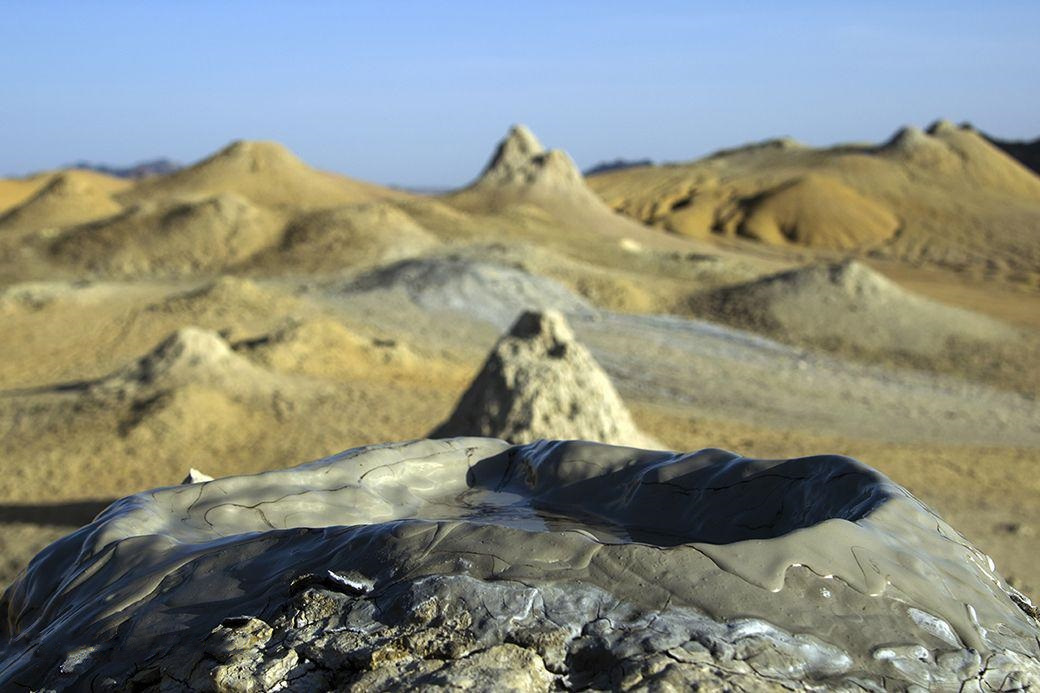

Pirgel is a mud volcano in Iran, in the province Sistan and Balochistan close to the town of Khash. The mud volcano is accessible via a foot track.

Mud volcanoes are landforms where water and gas are extruded from the ground. In southeastern Iran they occur in two places, one close to volcanoes such as Bazman and Taftan and are hot (70–90 °C (158–194 °F)) effusions, the other is colder and linked to the extrusion of carbon dioxide and tectonic-sedimentary processes. Several theories have been proposed to explain cold mud volcanoes, one of which posits that water in clay is trapped and thus pressurized, causing the clay to liquefy and erupt on the surface along faults. Despite its location close to the two aforementioned volcanoes, Pirgel is considered to be a cold mud volcano, with temperatures of 20.5–30 °C (68.9–86.0 °F).

Pirgel contains a main cone with an elevation of 1,667 metres (5,469 ft) above sea level, and 127 metres (417 ft) above the terrain. This makes it a relatively high mud volcano, the highest and with 1,400 metres (4,600 ft) width the biggest mud volcano in Iran. Venting occurs through cones, gryphons and pools. There are eleven individual craters, of which seven are active, but they are all relatively small. The mud volcano covers an area of 50 hectares (120 acres) on a marl hill, also a relatively large size. Erosion from flowing water has affected both the surroundings as well as the mud volcano itself, forming gullies and ravines probably from the collapse of caverns. Eroded and inactive vents testify of past activity.

The mud volcano was reported active in May 2003, with the extrusion of cold muddy water and the eruption of bubbles every 15-600 seconds. This mud is relatively liquid and fairly saline. The gas extruded at Pirgel is principally carbon dioxide; unlike other mud volcanoes in the region methane is not a component. The mud volcano is considered to be a sacred place by local people, the site where a holy person manifests itself.
