= Mount Churchill =

Volcano in the St Elias Mountains, Alaska

- An aerial view showing the summit and caldera of Mount Churchill in June 2002

Highest point
- Elevation: 4,766 m (15,636 ft)
- Prominence: 1,188 ft (362 m)
- Coordinates: 61°25′9″N 141°42′55″W

Geography
- Location within Alaska
- Interactive map of Mount Churchill
- Location: Wrangell-St. Elias National Park and Preserve, Alaska, U.S.
- Parent range: Saint Elias Mountains
- Topo map: USGS McCarthy B-2 Quadrangle

Geology
- Mountain type: Stratovolcano with caldera
- Volcanic field: Wrangell Volcanic Field
- Last eruption: 700 AD ± 200 years

Climbing
- First ascent: August 20, 1951 by R. Gates, J. Lindberg
- Easiest route: snow climb

Mount Churchill is a dormant volcano in the Saint Elias Mountains and the Wrangell Volcanic Field (WVF) of eastern Alaska. Churchill and its neighbor Mount Bona are both ice-covered volcanoes with Churchill having a 2.7-by-4.2-kilometre-wide (1.7 mi × 2.6 mi) caldera just east of its summit. There are sparse outcrops of lava flows and tephra, mostly dacite.

Subduction of the Pacific Plate beneath southeastern Alaska has largely ceased during the last one million years, causing a decline of the volcanic activity in the WVF. Churchill appears to be fed by melts derived from a stagnant slab in the mantle, left over by the previous subduction.

The volcano erupted several times during the Holocene. The most notable eruptions are the two White River Ash eruptions, deposited during two of the largest volcanic eruptions in North America during the past two millennia. The northern lobe was emplaced about 1,890 years ago, while the larger eastern lobe erupted in winter 852/853. The White River Ash covers vast expanses of Alaska and western Canada and has been found as far as Europe, and there is evidence that the Athabaskan people migrated out of the region and into the present-day United States as a consequence of the eruption.

== Geography and geomorphology ==
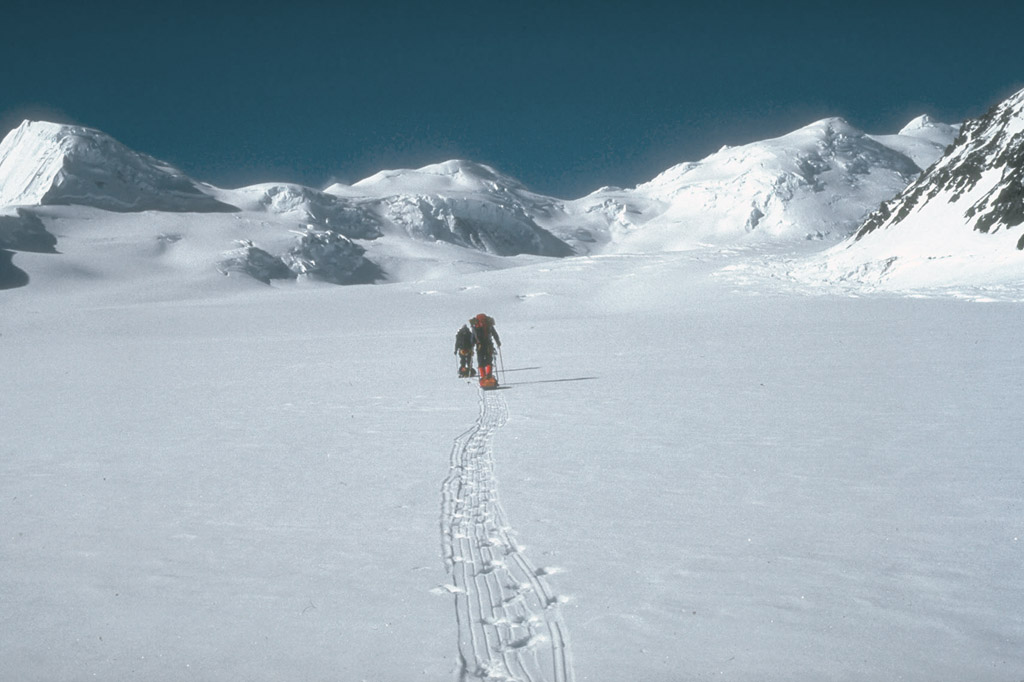
U.S. Geological Survey climbing party ascending the Klutlan Glacier en route to Mount Churchill

The mountain is in the University Mountains sub-range of the Saint Elias Mountains of Alaska, 64 kilometres (40 mi) east of McCarthy, Alaska, and 25 kilometres (16 mi) or 40 kilometres (25 mi) from the border with Canada. The area is part of the Wrangell-St. Elias National Park and Preserve. It is extremely remote and there are no roads from which it is visible. The mountain was first ascended in 20 August 1951 by R. Gates and J. Lindberg and named in 1965 after the English politician Winston Churchill and is also known as Klutlan Glacier, Churchill-Bona, or White River volcano.

Various measurements have yielded summit heights (Note: The value of 5,005 metres (16,421 ft) given by the Global Volcanism Program actually refers to Mount Bona) of 4,744 metres (15,564 ft), 4,766 metres (15,636 ft), 4,767 metres (15,640 ft) or 4,768 metres (15,643 ft). It is a mountain in a glaciated, (Note: About 90% of the area is covered by snow and ice.) rugged mountain massif that rises sharply above the surrounding land. It is the tenth-highest peak in the United States. The mountain is mostly covered by ice hundreds of meters thick, but lava flows with columnar jointing and tephra deposits form outcrops, indicating that Mount Churchill may be a stratovolcano. East of Mount Churchill, 300 metres (980 ft) below the summit, is a 2.7-by-4.2-kilometre-wide (1.7 mi × 2.6 mi) caldera, which forms a flat amphitheater open to the northeast. Numerous outcrops of light-colored pumice with embedded lithics (Note: Derived presumably from the magma conduit) occur around the amphitheater, which is otherwise entirely ice-covered. There are further outcrops of tephra in areas protected from erosion around the volcano; the largest such outcrop covers an area exceeding 3 square kilometres (1.2 sq mi). Pumice forms terraces above the sides of the Klutlan Glacier, over a length of more than 20 kilometres (12 mi). Their position above the present-day glacier surface may indicate that at the time of their deposition, the ice was thicker than present-day. Alternatively, they could have deposited during floods over the ice, perhaps after an eruption or the breach of a pumice-dammed lake. A 90-metre-high (300 ft) pumice mound on the other side of the glacier, 16 kilometres (9.9 mi) from Mount Churchill, was formed by tephra building up on a bedrock bench. It was once considered the vent of the White River Ash. In some places, 1-metre-thick (3.3 ft) volcanic ash covers the pumice.

The older Mount Bona is 3.2 kilometres (2 mi) southwest of Mount Churchill. With a summit height of 5,005 metres (16,421 ft) (Note: Sometimes its elevation is given as 5,029 metres (16,499 ft)) above sea level, it is the highest mountain in the Wrangell Mountains and the highest volcano in the Wrangell volcanic field and the United States in general. A snow-covered col at 4,400 metres (14,400 ft) elevation separates the two mountains. Both mountains are covered with about 5 cubic kilometres (1.2 cu mi) of ice. The Russell and Klutlan Glaciers run along the northern-western and eastern-southern side of Mount Churchill, respectively. The Klutlan Glacier is flanked by moraines and talus deposits. Both glaciers eventually discharge into the White River. Glaciers on the southern flank of Mount Bona discharge into the Chitina River. Ice on Mount Churchill is up to 800, and possibly 1500, years old.

== Geology ==
The more than 500-kilometre-long (310 mi) Wrangell volcanic field (WVF) has been active for the past 30 million years in the Wrangell and St. Elias Mountains. The Wrangell volcanic field features numerous large shield volcanoes, which are among the largest arc volcanoes on Earth. Mount Drum and other volcanoes in the WVF during the middle Pleistocene had eruptions even larger than the White River Ash eruptions. Mount Churchill and Mount Wrangell are the only volcanoes in the WVF with Holocene eruptions. With the exception of Mount Churchill, volcanism in the Wrangell volcanic field has migrated northwestwards and declined as plate configuration changed about 200,000 years ago and subduction ceased.

Mount Churchill and Mount Bona consist of andesitic lava flows. University Peak is a 8.4 million years old volcanic intrusion, now exposed through erosion. The basement under Mount Bona is formed by a plateau consisting of Permian to Pennsylvanian-age rocks and Tertiary granites; most of Mount Bona may be formed by these nonvolcanic rocks.

Off the western coast of southeastern Alaska, the Pacific Plate used to subduct under the North American Plate, giving rise to the WVF. Since the Jurassic, seven separate terranes were transported to Alaska by the Pacific Plate and attached to the continent: Windy terrane, the various Wrangellia terranes, Chugach, Prince William and most recently the Yakutat Block, which is in the process of being accreted. The collision with the Yakutat Block caused the cessation of subduction, with plate motion now occurring along strike-slip faults like the Denali and Totschunda Faults while subduction continues farther west in the Aleutian megathrust. The intersection of the Totschunda Fault with the Connector and Duke River fault(s) may be the point where magma ascends into Mount Churchill.

=== Composition and origin of magmas ===
Churchill rocks are dacitic (Note: The White River Ash has also been described as rhyodacitic or rhyolitic.) and define a calc-alkaline adakite suite. There is a moderate quantity of phenocrysts, including biotite, hornblende, ilmenite, hypersthene, magnetite and plagioclase, with little apatite and orthopyroxene. Several different rock chemistries contribute to each of the White River Ash lobes, which are otherwise very similar to each other and thus difficult to distinguish. The particles in the eastern lobe are coarser than in the northern and show evidence of two separate chemical trends; the deposits on Mount Churchill match the composition of the eastern lobe. Reconstructed magma temperatures are 950–990 °C (1,740–1,810 °F) for the northern lobe magma and 995–1,030 °C (1,823–1,886 °F) for the eastern lobe magma.

The Wrangell slab left over from the subduction may have stalled in the mantle, and was heated by asthenosphere flowing through a slab window until it melted and gave rise to the Mount Churchill magmas, which thus have an adakitic composition typical for melts derived from subducted basalts at high temperatures. During ascent, the magmas were further modified by interaction with the underlying basement of the Alexander terrane. Each of the White River Ash eruptions probably involved several different magma batches, rather than one layered magma chamber.

== Ice cores and climate ==
Several ice cores have been taken from the Bona-Churchill massif and are an important source of information on the climate of the Pacific Northwest. An ice core taken in 2002 from the col between Mount Churchill and Mount Bona is the longest non-polar ice core as of 2006, being 460.96 metres (1,512.3 ft) long.

The ice cores record evidence of volcanic eruptions, including of Katmai, Krakatau, Laki and Tambora, and of climate variations like the Medieval Warm Period and the Little Ice Age. Other processes recorded in the Bona-Churchill ice cores are dust emissions in China, wildfires in Alaska, North Pacific sea surface temperatures, position of the Aleutian Low weather system and Arctic sea ice cover. Shallow ice and snow has been used to reconstruct dust composition at the St. Elias Mountains.

The Chugach Mountains block the maritime airmasses, leading to a continental climate in the region. Mean annual temperature on Mount Churchill is about −23 °C (−9 °F). Annually, about 1 metre (3 ft 3 in) of snow water equivalent falls on Mount Churchill.

== Eruption history ==
The age of the Churchill-Bona massif is unknown but Mount Churchill began erupting during the late Pleistocene. Potassium-argon dating has yielded an age of 119,000±17,000 years for a dacite lava close to the summit. The 190,000 years old Sheep Creek tephra sub-unit "F" in Canada and Alaska may have originated at Mount Churchill, but more likely at Mount Drum. The appearance and height of Mount Churchill (and neighbouring Bona) imply that they were constructed in recent time. The mountain may have looked very different before the White River Ash eruptions.

There are six Holocene volcanic eruptions that may be attributed to Mount Churchill. Ash emplaced around 647±55 CE may come either from Mount Churchill or Redoubt volcano, and European tephras emplaced around 2,350 BCE and Greenland-Europe tephras from around 1100 CE resemble these of Mount Churchill. Two tephra layers in southeastern Alaska, the 300 years old "Lena ash" and the 6,330 years old "MTR-146" ash, resemble the White River Ash and may have been produced by eruptions of Mount Churchill; tephra with similar composition to the "Lena tephra" has been found in Europe. If the 1650 CE "Lena ash" comes from the volcano, it would be its youngest eruption. Beyond these, volcanic activity was uncommon in the region.

=== White River Ash eruptions ===
Mount Churchill is the source (Note: The absence of White River Ash in the Bona-Churchill ice core has been cited as an argument against it being the source, but there is evidence of reworked White River Ash in the core. Evidence is more definitive for the eastern lobe than the northern one.) of two of the largest volcanic eruptions of the past two millennia in North America. The first eruption about 1,890 years ago emplaced the northern lobe of the White River Ash ("Northern White River Ash"), the better known second eruption in winter 852/853 (Note: Between September 852 and January 853) emplaced the eastern lobe ("Eastern White River Ash"). Both were very violent Plinian eruptions with a volcanic explosivity index of 6.

Deposits from the eruption were first discovered in 1883 along the upper Yukon River. After Mount Wrangell had been ruled out as its source in 1892, Mount Natazhat was proposed instead as the source vent and in 1965 Mount Bona. Only in 1984 and 1995 was Mount Churchill identified as the source. The eruptions produced about 25–50 cubic kilometres (6.0–12.0 cu mi) of tephra and covered an area exceeding 540,000 square kilometres (210,000 sq mi) in Alaska, (Note: As far as the Brooks Range) Yukon Territory and Northwest Territories. The present-day towns of Dawson City and Whitehorse, Canada, are within the 25-millimetre (1 in) thickness area of the northern and eastern lobe, respectively. The ash is located at shallow depth in the ground, unless carried deeper underground by soil processes. (Note: It can end up in early Holocene sediments, thus creating problems with tephrochronological correlations) It forms conspicuous layers along the Alaska Highway, in riverbanks of the Yukon, Tanana and their tributaries. The ash layers affect the properties of the soil they are in; they contribute to the formation of soils and sometimes they are the detachment surface of landslides. Closer to the US-Alaska border at the Klutlan Glacier it thickens to form dune-covered ash fields and areas lacking vegetation, as the ash is an unsuitable ground for plant growth. Stumps of trees killed by the fallout emerge from the ash layers close to Mount Churchill. Ash is frequently reworked and redeposited, and forms soils in the St. Elias Mountains. Glaciers such as the Barnard and Klutlan Glaciers have captured and transported pumice and ash, or eroded ash layers when they advanced; some moraines at the foot of the St. Elias Mountains are formed mainly by White River Ash. Ash is washed away by the Klutlan and White River, contributing in no small part (together with glacial flour) to its distinctive color that gives the White River its name. The ash deposits have been used as a time marker in tephrochronology to obtain dates for natural events and archaeological sites from Alaska and Yukon as well as Greenland (correlation of ice cores) and Ireland in Europe.

Apart from direct physical effects, the Mount Churchill eruption likely had a strong psychological effect on the people in the affected area. The eruption column would have been visible for many hundreds of kilometers. Soon after it began, the sky would have turned dark for days and noise and lightning would have been heard and seen in Yukon. About 500 people might have been living in the directly affected area. It is probable that there were no direct casualties from the eruption; pyroclastic flows and other direct effects of the eruption were limited to the uninhabited surroundings of Mount Churchill, and the structures humans lived in at the time were unlikely to collapse under ash accumulation. There is disagreement on whether oral tradition referring to the White River Ash eruptions can be identified among the Athapaskans.

==== Northern White River Ash ====
The northern White River Ash extends along the Alaska–Canada border and reaches a thickness of 5–10 centimetres (2.0–3.9 in) 380 kilometres (240 mi) west of the volcano, declining to 2.5 centimetres (0.98 in) 580 kilometres (360 mi) north of Mount Churchill. The White River Ash is a formal stratigraphic unit in Alaska, and particles from it have been detected as far as the northern Brooks Range in Alaska. The widespread "PWS tephra" in Prince William Sound was emplaced between 2,039 and 1,520 years ago and resembles the northern White River Ash. The eruption may have occurred during summer, when winds blow from the south, and the eruption column might have been 30–35 kilometres (19–22 mi) high. While not as well studied as the east lobe eruption, its impact on human populations was relatively modest, with few signs of population or culture shifts.

==== Eastern White River Ash ====
The eastern White River Ash is better studied and covers a wider area. Its intensity was intermediate between the Mount Mazama eruption and the 1883 eruption of Krakatau. It was more than twice the size of the 1912 Novarupta/Katmai eruption and was ten times larger than the 1991 eruption of Mount Pinatubo. A 40–45-kilometre-high (25–28 mi) eruption column rose over the volcano, injecting ash into the stratosphere; ash fell more than a thousand kilometers away and sulfate and chloride precipitated in the Greenland Ice Sheet. Strong westerly winds carried the ash cloud eastward, where it may have mixed with snow as it fell out. The eastern lobe of the White River Ash is 2.5 centimetres (0.98 in) thick at 600 kilometres (370 mi) distance from Mount Churchill, extending to the Great Slave and Great Bear Lakes. The eastern White River Ash has a color ranging from white to beige.

Ash deposits from the eastern White River Ash have been detected across North America and into Europe, where it is identical to the "AD860B" ash found in Ireland, Great Britain, Scandinavia, Germany, Poland (Note: Where ash deposition is recorded through speleothems in Kletno Bear Cave) and Greenland. Other findings are in Nova Scotia, south-central Alaska, southeastern Alaska and the adjacent Pacific Ocean, Newfoundland, Maine, potentially as far as Tibet. These findings 7,000 kilometres (4,300 mi) from the volcano make the White River Ash one of the most extensive tephra deposits of the past 100,000 years, and drew attention to the potential for intercontinental spread of volcanic ash even by once-per-century eruptions.

Territories impacted by the ashfall may have needed decades to recover, with century-long changes in vegetation, aquatic and peat productivity as forests opened up in some areas with ashfall. In lakes, volcanic ash can either bury organisms, or release nutrients such as phosphorus and thus increase productivity; both effects have been noted for the White River Ash. Burial of food sources and ingestion of ash and fluoride would have impacted caribou, goats, moose and sheep populations, forcing them to move away; genomic data indicate a large shift in caribou populations after the eastern White River Ash eruption, although this theory is not uncontested. Ash fall into rivers and the remobilization of ash fallen on land would have disrupted waterfowl, salmon runs and other fish populations, although anadromous fish populations would have recovered within a short timeframe.

Southern Yukon was depopulated by the eruption. Local hunter-gatherer populations probably left the worst-hit areas and sought refuge in unaffected regions, returning only when conditions had improved or not at all. Archaeological data indicate that some important trade routes were abandoned and new ones established after the eastern White River Ash eruption, implying that the displacement fostered a re-evaluation of economic activity and that displaced people had set up new trade networks. The use of copper (Note: Erosion caused by the volcanic events may have led to the discovery of copper in the White River-Copper River area, as stated by oral tradition) and bows and arrows may have arrived in the Yukon territory that way, and Dene people moved into coastal areas, sometimes coming into conflict with previously established people there and sometimes establishing new kin and commercial networks. Other Dene people migrated south and east (Note: Possibly also north) after the eruption, driving the Athabaskan expansion and spreading the Na-Dene languages across the continent. By the arrival of the Europeans, Athabaskans like the Apache (Note: Whose language probably began developing around the time of the eruption) and Navajo had spread between subarctic Canada and the Great Basin of the southwestern United States, bringing their languages with them.

The eruption produced sulfate aerosols, which can dim the Sun and cause a cooling of Earth's climate, creating a volcanic winter. The sulfur yield, 2.5 teragrams, was relatively modest, one third of that from the 1991 eruption of Mount Pinatubo. Climate models imply a maximum cooling of 0.3 °C (0.54 °F), reaching 0.8 °C (1.4 °F) in some models, with no clear changes in precipitation. There are widespread reports of bad weather and resulting hardships such as famines during that decade in Europe, and a clear link to the Mount Churchill eruption is not established; at worst, it would have aggravated a pre-existent climate disturbance. A link between the White River Ash and the mid-6th century cooling (Late Antique Little Ice Age) has been ruled out.

== Hazards ==
Mount Churchill is one of Canada's most dangerous volcanoes, despite being outside of the country, owing to the size of its eruptions. Renewed large-scale activity would be extremely hazardous for northwestern Canada and adjoining Alaska. Smaller eruptions could threaten the White River valley and the Alaska Highway there with ash fall and floods caused by blockages in the White River. Similar flood hazards exist in the Chitina and Copper River valleys south of Mount Churchill. The United States Geological Service ranks Mount Churchill as a "high threat" volcano. (Note: "High threat" is the second-highest in a five-class scale, which considers both the threat posed by a volcano and the infrastructure/population/other human uses at risk.)

Ashfall could damage machinery, forests and waterbodies, and cause breathing problems. Even small eruptions of the high volcano could cause disturbances in air travel. In addition, the intercontinental spread of ash would cause severe disruption, similar but on a larger scale to the 2010 eruptions of Eyjafjallajökull, with resultant consequences to transportation and the airline industry. Aircraft routes between Asia, Europe and North America pass through the extent of the White River Ash plume.
