= Capital Mountain =

Mountain in Alaska, United States

- Location within Alaska

Highest point
- Elevation: 7,730 ft (2,356 m)
- Prominence: 1,801 ft (549 m)
- Isolation: 7.63 mi (12.28 km)
- Coordinates: 62°25′25″N 144°06′51″W

Geography
- Country: United States
- State: Alaska
- Census Area: Copper River
- Protected area: Wrangell–St. Elias National Park and Preserve
- Parent range: Wrangell Mountains
- Topo map: USGS Gulkana B-1

Geology
- Rock age: Pleistocene
- Mountain type: Eroded shield volcano
- Rock type: Andesite
- Volcanic field: Wrangell Volcanic Field
- Last eruption: 1 million years ago

Capital Mountain is an andesitic shield volcano located in Alaska. Its elevation is 7,730 ft (2356 m).

== Climate ==
Based on the Köppen climate classification, Capital Mountain is located in a subarctic climate zone, with long, cold, snowy winters, and cool summers. Weather systems coming off the Gulf of Alaska are forced upwards by the Wrangell Mountains (orographic lift), causing heavy precipitation in the form of rainfall and snowfall. Winter temperatures can drop below -10 °F with wind chill factors below −20 °F.

== See also ==
- Geography of Alaska
- Tanada Peak
