= Wrangell volcanic field =

Volcanic field in Alaska, United States and Yukon, Canada

Coordinates: 62.0272°N 143.6217°W

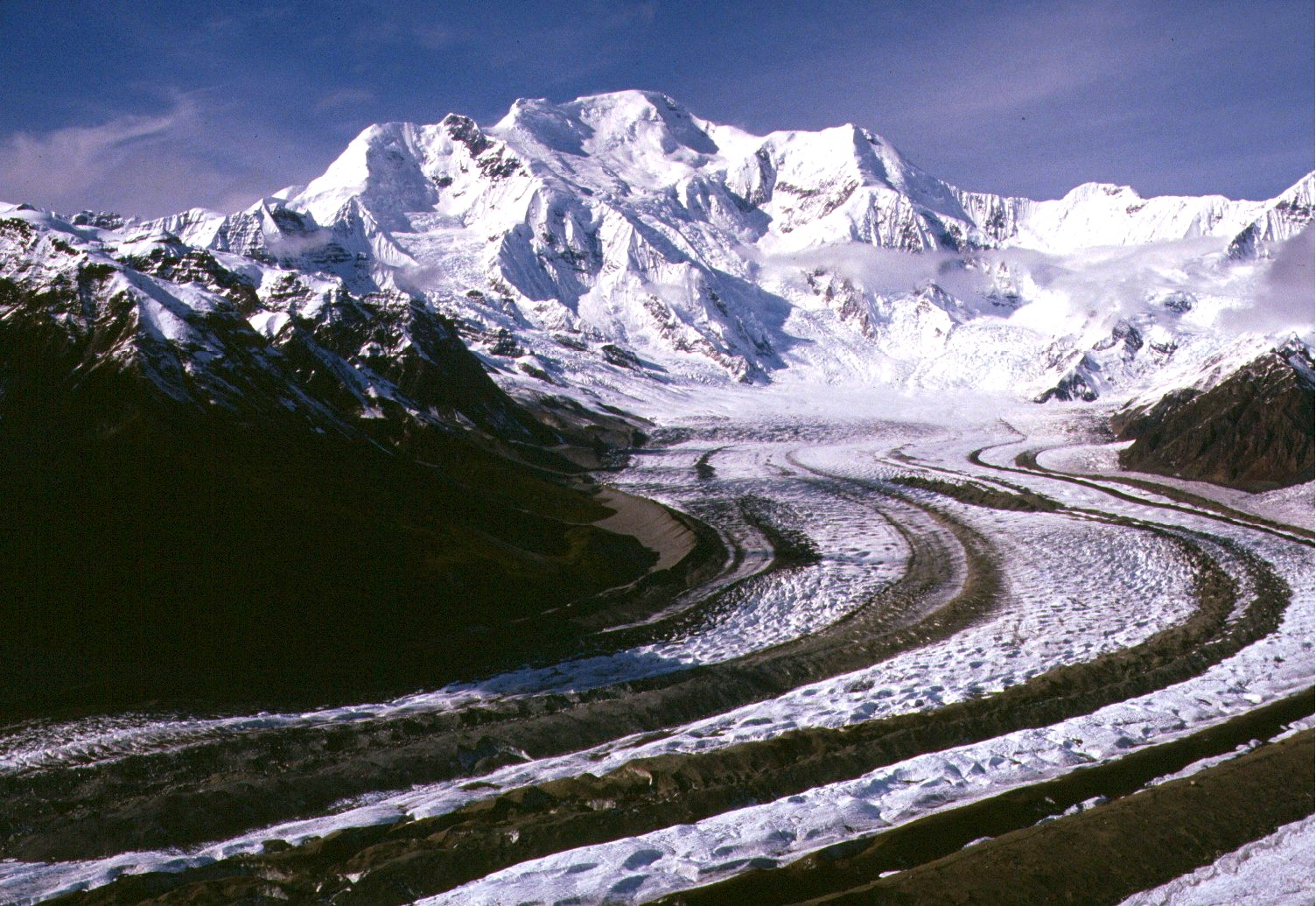
Mount Blackburn

The Wrangell volcanic field is a volcanic field stretching from eastern Alaska in the United States to southwestern Yukon in Canada. The field includes the four highest volcanoes in the United States, Mount Bona, Mount Blackburn, Mount Sanford, and Mount Churchill, all of which exceed 15,000 ft (4,600 m) in elevation. It formed as a result of subduction of the Pacific Plate beneath the North American Plate at the easternmost end of the Aleutian Trench.

The bulk of the Wrangell volcanic field lies within the Wrangell Mountains of Alaska, but the field also extends eastwards along the Yukon border.

The east–west length of the field is over 200 mile (320 km), while the width reaches up to 80 miles (130 km) in the central Wrangell Mountains. The field includes numerous shield volcanoes, stratovolcanoes, caldera complexes, cinder cones, and extensive lava flows, which have erupted throughout the past 26 million years. All of the higher peaks are less than 5 million years old, since the rate of glacial erosion is very high in this region of extreme snowfall and cold temperatures. Higher elevations of the field above 5,000 ft (1,500 m) are almost entirely covered in glaciers and icefields, especially on the windward southern side of the ranges.

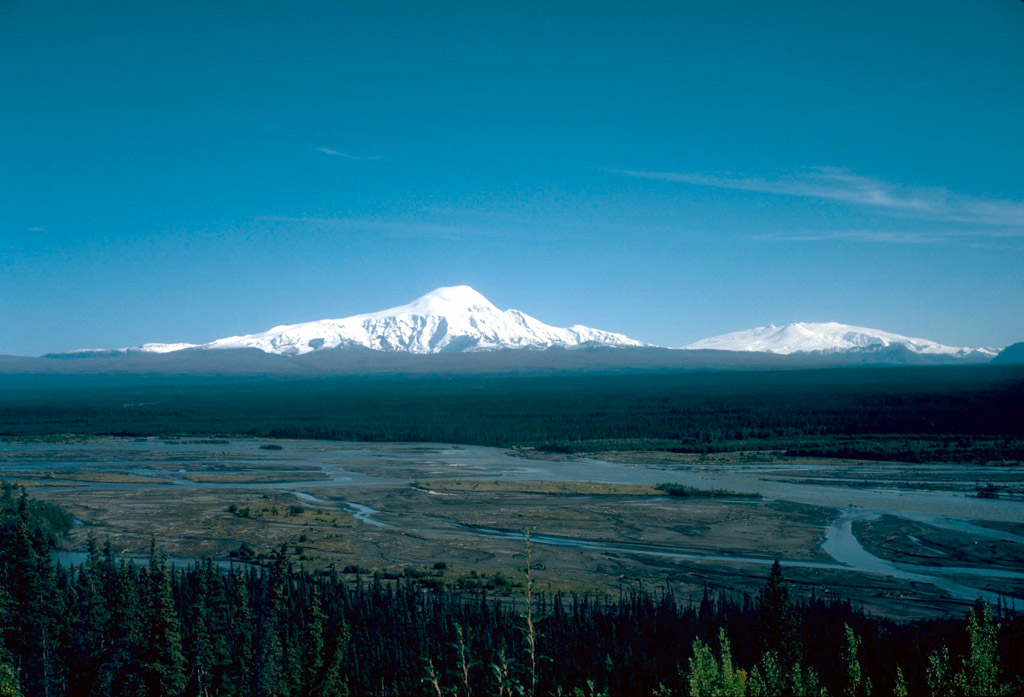
Mount Sanford (left) and Mount Wrangell

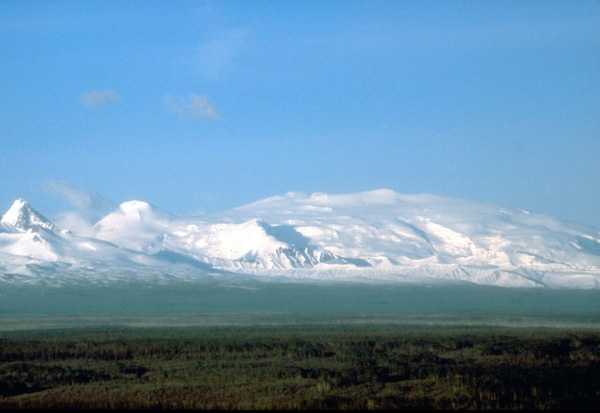
Mount Wrangell

The field is named for Mount Wrangell, a massive shield volcano which has been active historically. The stratovolcano of Mount Churchill has had the largest recent eruptions, with two large-magnitude explosive eruptions in the last 2,000 years that blanketed most of the Yukon with volcanic ash (the White River Ash).

The volcanoes of the western Wrangell Mountains are less than 5 million years old with the youngest lava flows are probably as young as 50,000 years ago. The Canadian portion of the field is dominated by scattered remnants of upper Cenozoic subaerial lavas and pyroclastic rocks. Over large areas extrusive rocks lie in flat undisturbed piles on a Cenozoic surface of moderate relief. Locally, however, strata of the same age have been affected by a late pulse of tectonism, during which they were faulted, contorted into tight symmetrical folds, or overridden by pre-Cenozoic baserocks along southwesterly dipping thrust faults. Considerable recent uplift, accompanied by rapid erosion, has reduced once vast areas of upper Cenozoic volcanic rocks to small isolated remnants. Although no centers younger than late Miocene are known in Canada, the eruption of rhyolite pumice, White River Ash, from Mount Churchill near the head of Klutlan Glacier blanketed large areas of northwestern Canada with tephra some 2,000 years ago.

Most of volcanoes of the Western Wrangell Mountains are not like the other volcanoes located around the Pacific Rim. Rather than erupting explosive lavas forming stratovolcanoes, they have been built by the buildup of hundreds of comparatively fluid lava flows to form shield volcanoes. Only the young Mount Wrangell still shows its shield-like form; the other, commonly older volcanoes have had much of their original form removed by glacial and other erosional processes.

Major volcanoes of the Wrangell volcanic field include:

- Mount Bona, 16,421 ft (5,005 m), Saint Elias Mountains
- Mount Blackburn, 16,390 ft (4,996 m), Wrangell Mountains
- Mount Sanford, 16,237 ft (4,949 m), Wrangell Mountains
- Mount Churchill, 15,638 ft (4,766 m), Saint Elias Mountains
- Mount Wrangell, 14,163 ft (4,317 m), Wrangell Mountains
- Atna Peaks, 13,860 ft (4,225 m), Wrangell Mountains
- Regal Mountain, 13,845 ft (4,220 m), Wrangell Mountains
- Mount Jarvis, 13,421 ft (4,091 m), Wrangell Mountains
- Mount Drum, 12,010 ft (3,661 m), Wrangell Mountains

== See also ==
- List of volcanoes in the United States of America
- List of volcanoes in Canada
- List of volcanic fields
- Volcanism in Canada
