= Mount Natazhat =

Mountain in Alaska, United States

- Location within Alaska

Highest point
- Elevation: 13,435 ft (4,095 m)
- Prominence: 5,935 ft (1,809 m)
- Listing: North America highest peaks 96th; US highest major peaks 79th; US most prominent peaks 66th; Alaska highest major peaks 19th
- Coordinates: 61°31′19″N 141°06′04″W

Geography
- Country: United States
- State: Alaska
- Protected area: Wrangell–St. Elias National Park and Preserve
- Parent range: Saint Elias Mountains
- Topo map: USGS McCarthy C-1

Climbing
- First ascent: June 1913 by Canadian Boundary Survey party (disputed)
- Easiest route: Northeast Ridge: glacier/snow climb

Mount Natazhat is a high peak of the Saint Elias Mountains, of Alaska, United States, just west of the border with the Yukon Territory of Canada. It lies on the northern edge of the range, south of the White River and north of the Klutlan Glacier. Mount Natazhat is a little-noticed peak; however it is a very large peak in terms of rise above local terrain. It rises 9,000 feet (2,743 m) in less than 7 miles (11.3 km) above the lowlands to the north, and 7,500 feet (2,286 m) in about 4 miles (6.4 km) above the Klutlan Glacier to the south.

The current standard route is that of the second ascent along the northeast ridge. This route was first climbed in 1996 by D. Hart, P. Barry, H. Hunt, and D. Lucey. It is moderately serious by Alaskan standards (Alaska Grade 3+), with some steep ice and corniced ridges.

Mount Natazhat is not often climbed due to its remote location and the fact that it is not a particularly high peak, especially by Alaskan standards. (Also, it is not even a fourteener.) In fact, the only mention of the peak in the complete Index of the American Alpine Journal is for the 1996 ascent noted above.

== See also ==
- List of mountain peaks of North America
  - List of mountain peaks of the United States
    - List of mountain peaks of Alaska
- List of Ultras of the United States
