= Mount Wrangell =

Active volcanic mountain in America, United States

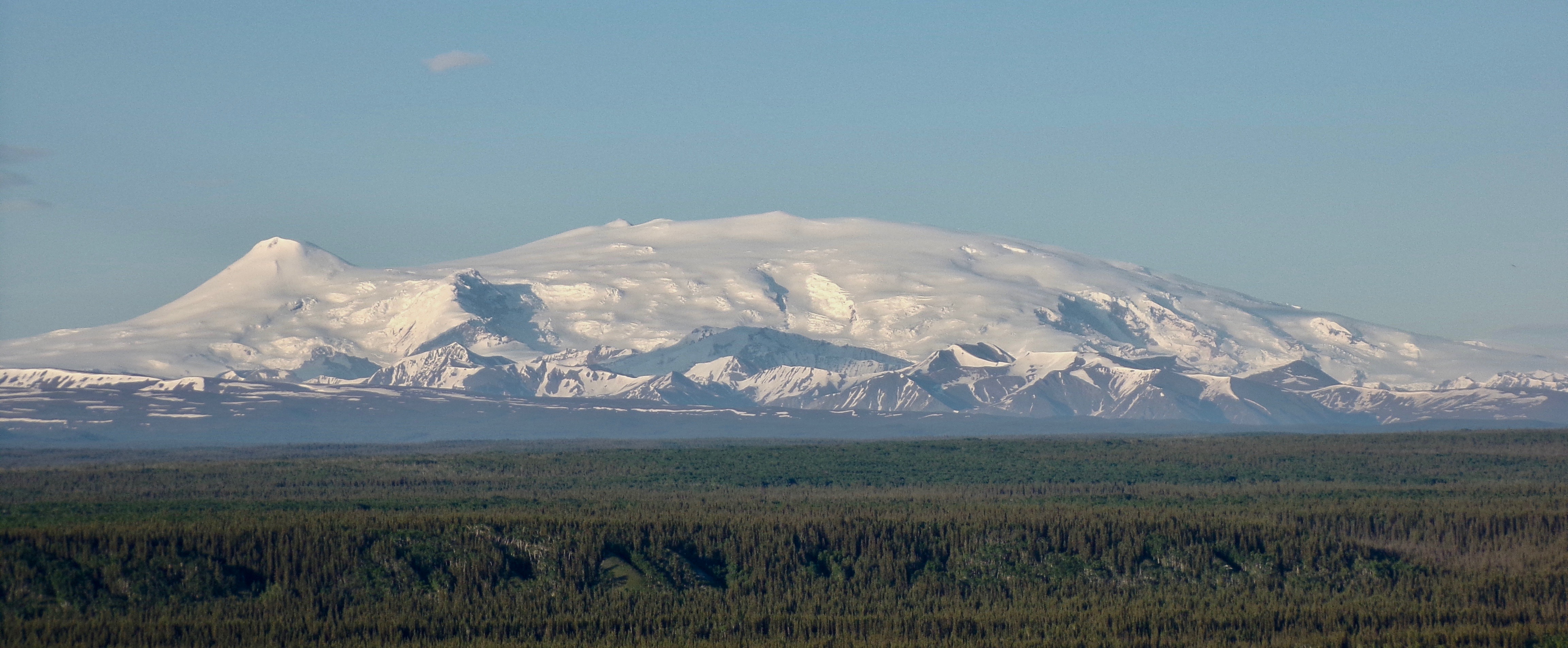
- Mount Wrangell seen from the west

Highest point
- Elevation: 14,163 ft (4,317 m); NAVD88
- Prominence: 5,613 ft (1,711 m)
- Isolation: 14.79 mi (23.8 km)
- Listing: North America highest peak 50th; US highest major peaks 36th; US most prominent peaks 84th; Alaska highest major peaks 13th
- Coordinates: 62°00′21″N 144°01′10″W

Geography
- Location within Alaska
- Interactive map of Mount Wrangell
- Location: Wrangell-St. Elias National Park and Preserve, Alaska, U.S.
- Parent range: Wrangell Mountains
- Topo map: USGS Gulkana A-1

Geology
- Rock age: Pleistocene
- Mountain type: Shield volcano
- Volcanic field: Wrangell Volcanic Field
- Last eruption: March–April 1930

Mount Wrangell, (Ahtna: K’ełt’aeni, or Uk’ełedi when erupting) is a massive shield volcano located in Wrangell-St. Elias National Park and Preserve in southeastern Alaska, United States. The shield rises over 12,000 feet (3,700 m) above the Copper River to its southwest. Its volume is over 220 cubic miles (920 km^{3}), making it more than twice as massive as Mount Shasta in California, the largest stratovolcano by volume in the Cascades. It is part of the Wrangell Mountains as well as the Wrangell Volcanic Field, which extends for more than 250 kilometers (160 mi) across Southcentral Alaska into the Yukon Territory in Canada, and has an eruptive history spanning the time from Pleistocene to Holocene.

== Description ==
Modern Mount Wrangell, built upon the remnants of a mid-Pleistocene volcano, has an eruptive history spanning from 750,000 years ago to minor phreatic eruptions in 1884. The shield volcano features an ice-filled caldera 2.5 by 3.7 miles (4 by 6 km) in diameter at the top of Wrangell's broad summit. The caldera was apparently formed by subsidence rather than large explosive eruptions. The caldera is in turn rimmed by three small craters, which often display fumarolic activity with steam plumes that can sometimes be seen from a distance. The main summit is on the north side of the caldera, while the west summit rises to 14,013 feet (4,271 m). The summit region above 13,000 feet (4,000 m) in elevation is over 2 by 5 miles (3 by 8 km) in size. A very large cinder cone, 13,009-foot (3,965 m) Mount Zanetti, rises nearly 1,000 feet (300 m) above the northwest flank of Wrangell and is the source of some lava flows.

Mount Wrangell is almost entirely covered by an icefield that persists from year to year. The largest glacier on Wrangell is Nabesna Glacier, the source of the Nabesna River. Other glaciers on Mount Wrangell include Cheshnina Glacier, Chetaslina Glacier, Chichokna Glacier, Dadina Glacier and Copper Glacier.

Wrangell was the first high volcano in the Wrangell range to be climbed. Its summit can be visited by ski-equipped airplane.

== Naming ==
Mount Wrangell [rang-guhl] was named after Russian Admiral Ferdinand von Wrangel (or Wrangell), governor of Russian America from 1830 to 1836. The Ahtna people call it K'elt'aeni, "the one who controls the weather," with the alternate name Uk'eledi, "the one with smoke on it" when it is active. On some pre-1900 maps Wrangell was labeled as Mount Tillman.

== Volcanic activity ==
Wrangell is the only volcano in the Wrangell Volcanic Field to have had historically recorded eruptions, generally in the form of small steam and ash explosions. Reports of activity have been recorded in 1784 and 1884–85. The 1784 eruption and another stated to have occurred in 1760 are disputed. The 1884-85 eruption was reported by local prospector Jon Bremner. An 1890 report mentioned a visible glow. Wrangell's most recent eruption is suggested to have occurred in March and April of 1930. It was initially attributed to Mount Blackburn.

The amount of geothermal heat being emitted by Wrangell increased from the 1950s to the 1980s, raising the possibility of a future eruption. The heat flux was high enough to melt ice around the craters and create ice caves and small lakes in the north crater, with about 100 million cubic meters of ice melted by 1986. Since then heat output has decreased and ice has reaccumulated.

Wrangell also occasionally emits ash, which can be seen coating the summit snow. The bulk of the mountain was built by large lava flows from 600,000 to 200,000 years ago. The summit caldera is believed to have collapsed within the last 200,000 years, and may have collapsed 50,000 years ago. Mount Zanetti is about 25,000 years old.

== Gallery ==
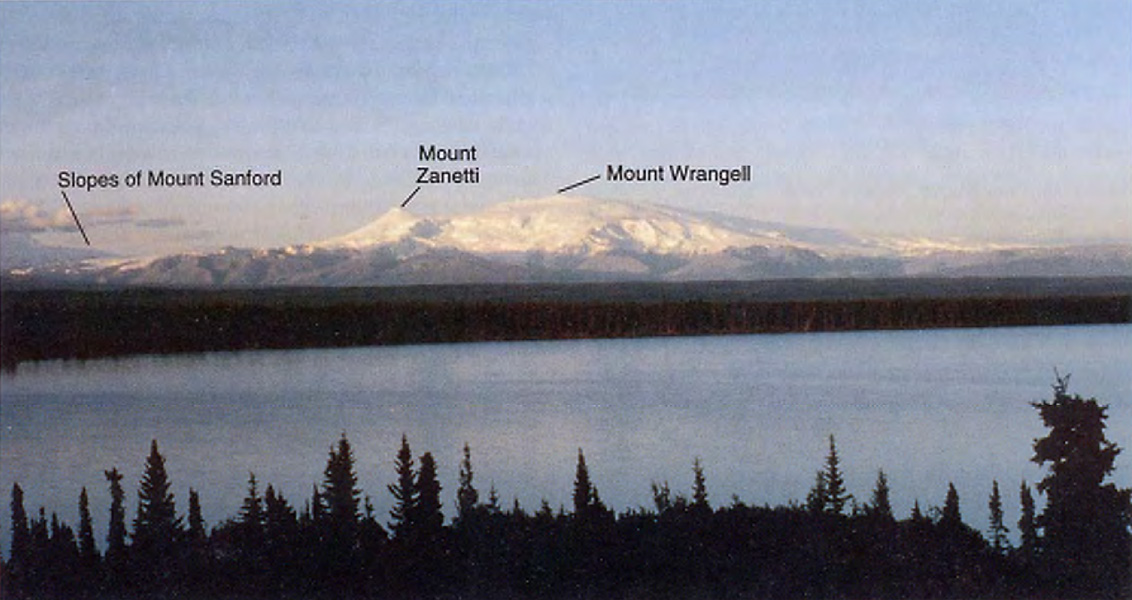
Mount Wrangell and Mount Zanetti from Willow Lake at 1600 ft (500m). Although Mount Wrangell rises over 12,000 ft (3700 m) above this viewpoint, its great height is masked by the extreme width of its shield-like form.

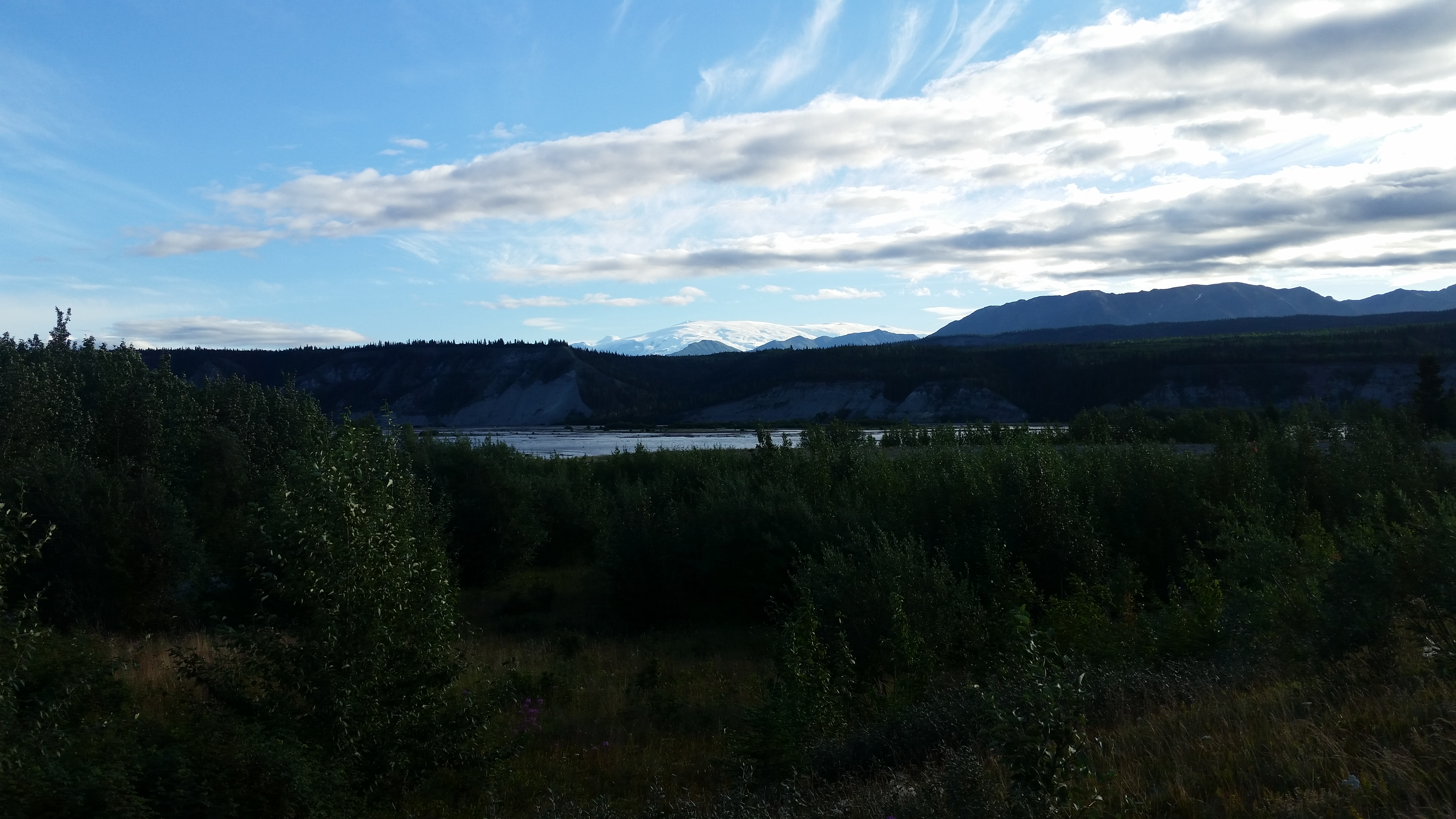
Mount Wrangell as seen from Chitina Airport

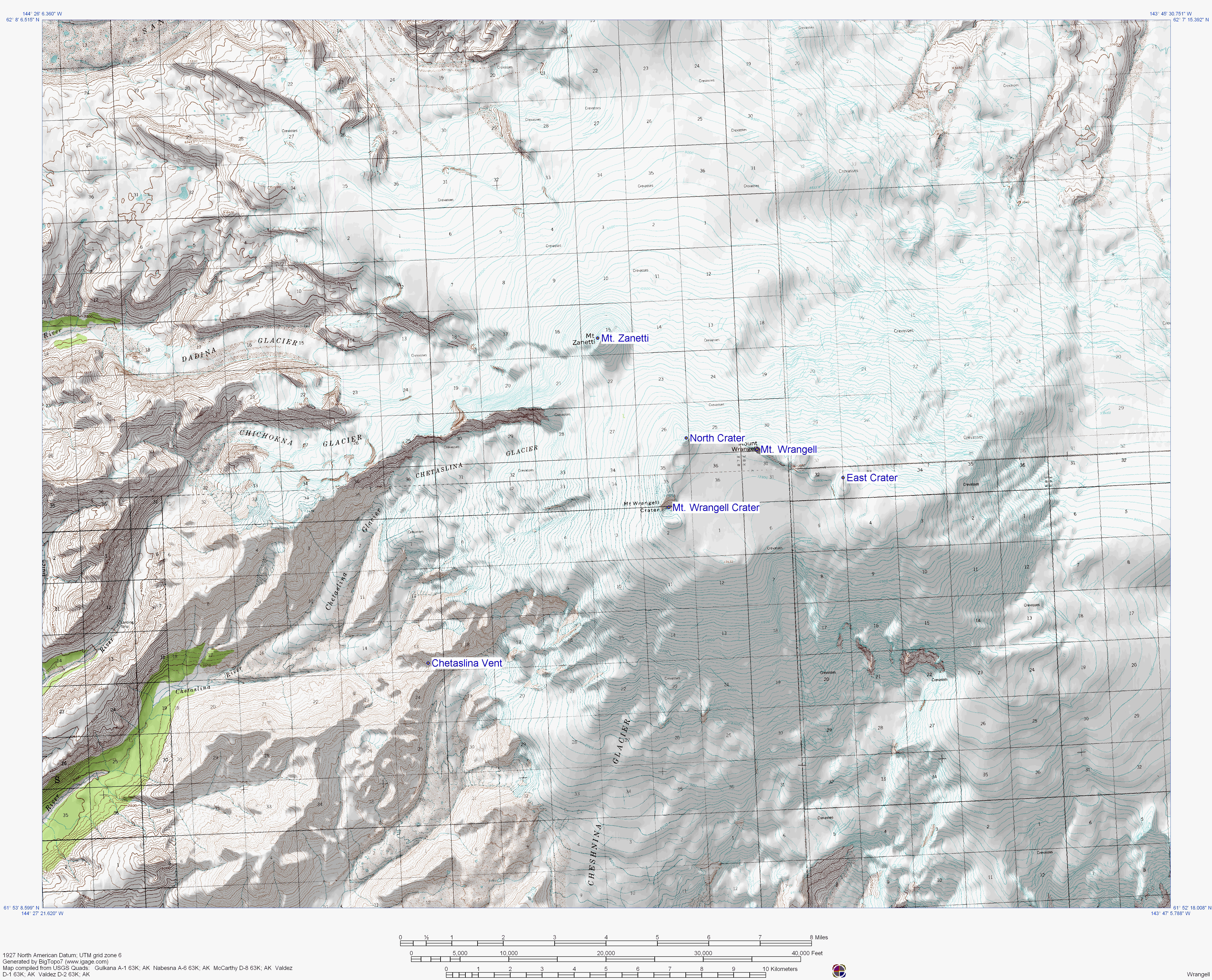
Topographic map of Mount Wrangell showing the summit caldera

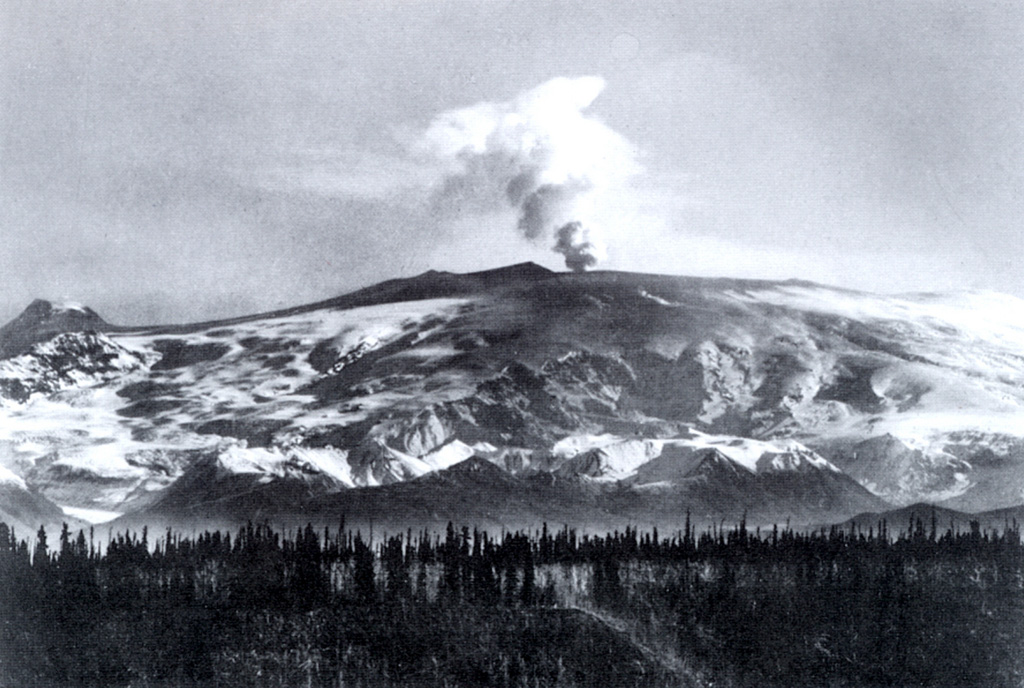
A plume and ash-covered snow at Mount Wrangell were photographed by United States Geological Survey scientist W.C. Mendenhall in 1902.

== See also ==
- List of mountain peaks of North America
  - List of mountain peaks of the United States
    - List of mountain peaks of Alaska
- List of Ultras of the United States
- List of volcanoes in the United States

== Bibliography ==
- Richter, Donald H.; Rosenkrans, Danny S.; Steigerwald, Margaret J. (1995). Guide to the Volcanoes of the Western Wrangell Mountains, Alaska. USGS Bulletin 2072.
- Winkler, Gary R. (2000). A Geologic Guide to Wrangell—Saint Elias National Park and Preserve, Alaska: A Tectonic Collage of Northbound Terranes. USGS Professional Paper 1616. ISBN 0-607-92676-7.
- Richter, Donald H.; Cindi C. Preller; Keith A. Labay; Nora B. Shew (2006). Geologic Map of the Wrangell-Saint Elias National Park and Preserve, Alaska. USGS Scientific Investigations Map 2877.
- Wood, Charles A.; Jürgen Kienle, eds. (1990). Volcanoes of North America. Cambridge University Press. ISBN 0-521-43811-X.
