= Wrangell Mountains =

Mountain range in the U.S. state of Alaska

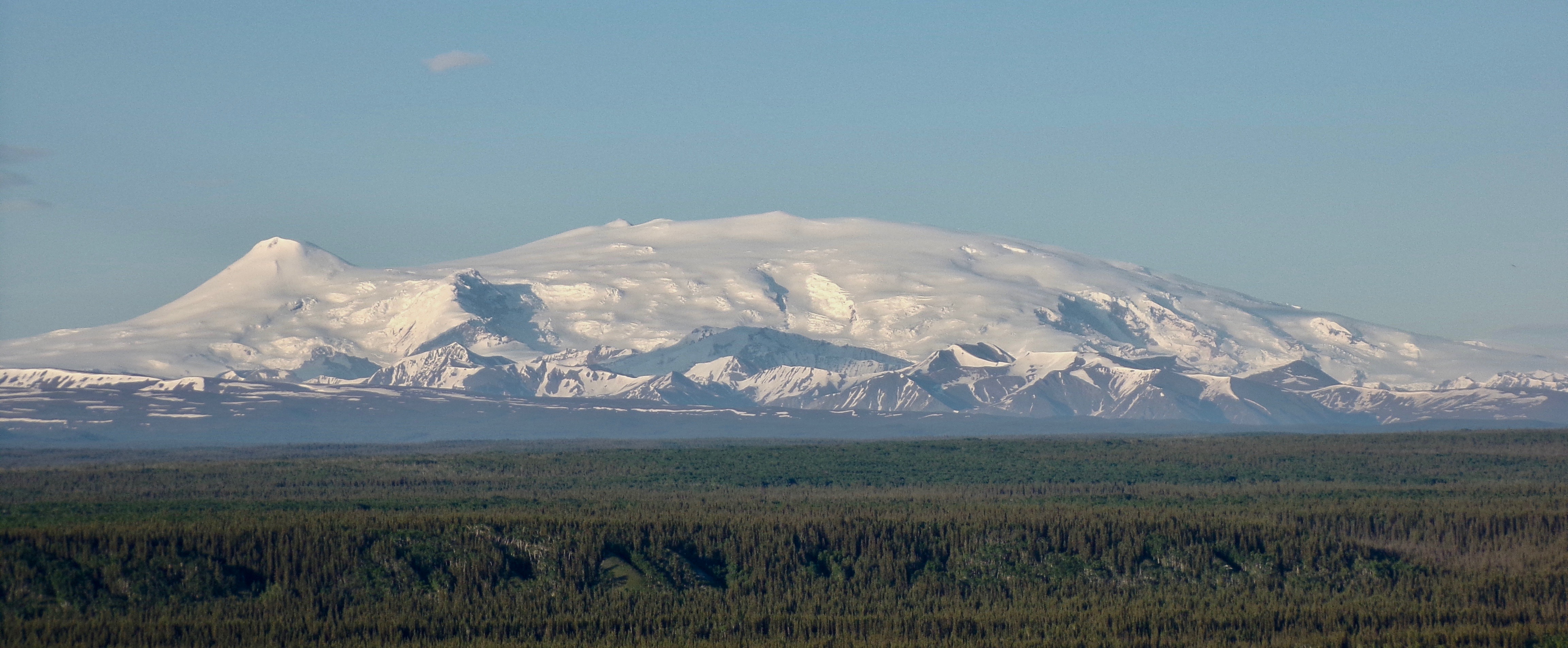
- Mount Wrangell viewed from the west in 2024

Highest point
- Peak: Mount Blackburn
- Elevation: 16,390 ft (4,996 m)
- Coordinates: 61°43′54″N 143°25′59″W

Geography
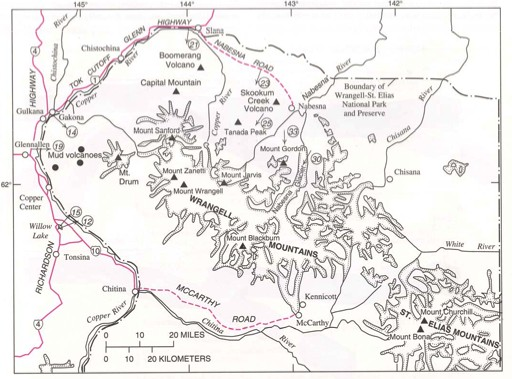
- Country: United States
- State: Alaska
- Range coordinates: 61°48′N 143°30′W
- Parent range: Yukon Ranges
- Borders on: Saint Elias Mountains; Chugach Mountains

The Wrangell Mountains are a high mountain range of eastern Alaska in the United States. Much of the range is included in Wrangell-Saint Elias National Park and Preserve. The Wrangell Mountains are almost entirely volcanic in origin, and they include the second and third highest volcanoes in the United States, Mount Blackburn and Mount Sanford. The range takes its name from Mount Wrangell, which is one of the largest andesite shield volcanoes in the world, and also the only presently active volcano in the range. The Wrangell Mountains comprise most of the Wrangell Volcanic Field, which also extends into the neighboring Saint Elias Mountains and the Yukon Territory in Canada.

The Wrangell Mountains are just to the northwest of the Saint Elias Mountains and northeast of the Chugach Mountains, which are along the coast of the Gulf of Alaska. These ranges have the combined effect of blocking the inland areas from warmer moist air over the Pacific Ocean. The inland areas to the north of the Wrangell Mountains are therefore among the coldest areas of North America during the winter.

== Major peaks ==
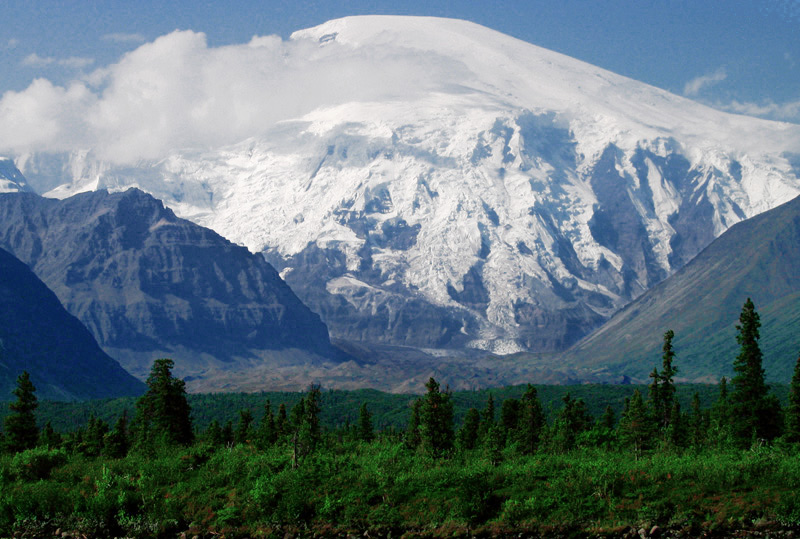
Mount Sanford

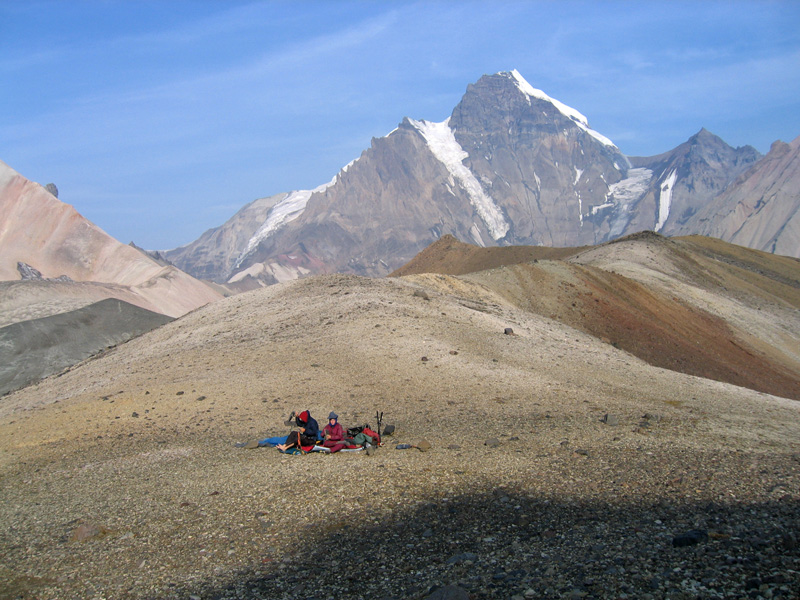
Hikers on a pass between Mt. Sanford and Mt. Drum

The Wrangell Mountains include 12 of the 40+ Alaskan peaks over 13,000 feet (4,000 m) (see fourteeners and thirteeners):

- Mount Blackburn, 16,390 feet (4,996 m), and East Summit, 16,286 ft (4,964 m)
- Mount Sanford, 16,237 feet (4,949 m), and South Peak, 13,654 ft (4,162 m)
- Mount Wrangell, 14,163 feet (4,317 m), and West Summit, 14,013 ft (4,271 m)
- Atna Peaks, 13,860 ft (4,225 m)
- Regal Mountain, 13,845 ft (4,220 m)
- Mount Jarvis, 13,421 feet (4,091 m), and North Peak, 13,025 ft (3,970 m)
- Parka Peak, 13,280 ft (4,048 m)
- Mount Zanetti, 13,009 ft (3,965 m)

Other prominent mountains include:

- Mount Drum, 12,010 ft (3,661 m)
- Castle Peak, 10,190 ft (3,106 m)

== Name origin and references in popular culture ==
The mountains are named after explorer, president of Russian-American Company, and admiral Ferdinand von Wrangel. American folk singer John Denver wrote a song, "The Wrangell Mountain Song", in reference to the range.

== See also ==
- Wrangellia Terrane
