= White River Ash =

1,200-year-old ash deposit in North America

The White River Ash is a 1,500-year-old tephra deposit found in the southern part of the Yukon Territory, Canada and eastern Alaska. The deposit is bilobate, formed by two large (VEI 6) explosive eruptions from the stratovolcano of Mount Churchill that occurred around 850 AD and blanketed 340,000 km^{2} (130,000 sq mi). While originally believed to only exist within North America, recent observations (2014) have found crypto-tephra from the eruption across northern Europe.

== See also ==
- Volcanism of Canada
- Volcanism of Northern Canada
