= Klutlan Glacier =

Glacier in Yukon, Canada and Alaska, United States

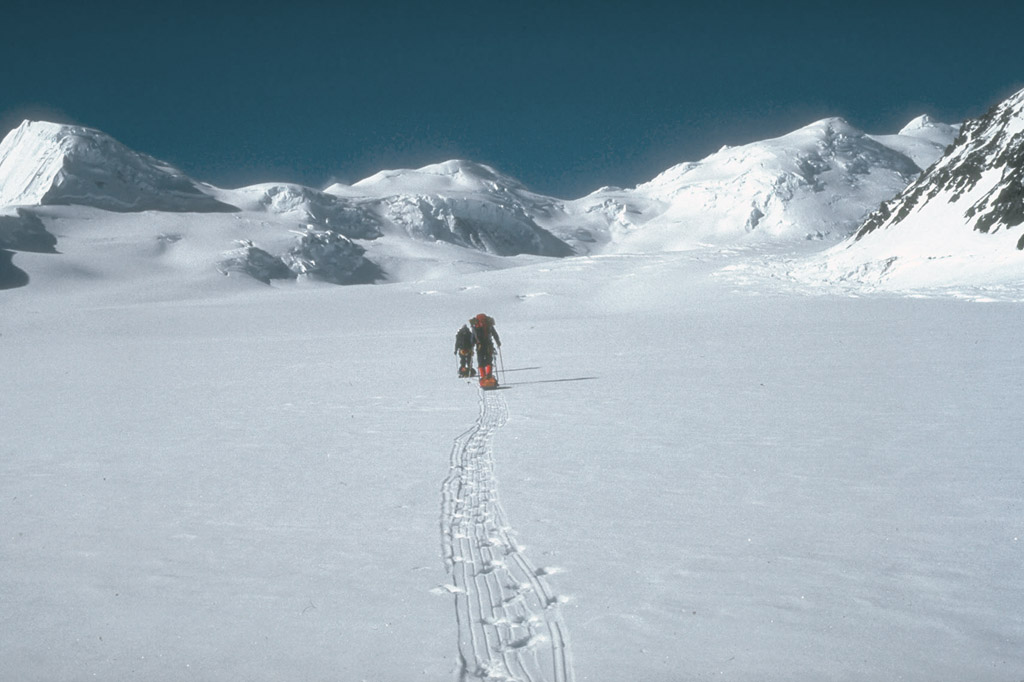

- Location within Alaska
- Interactive map of Klutlan Glacier
- Location: Alaska, U.S.
- Coordinates: 61°27′03″N 141°10′45″W
- Length: 40 mi (64 km)
- Status: Retreating

Klutlan Glacier is a 40-mile (64 km) long glacier in the U.S. state of Alaska. It is located southwest of Mount Nazirean and flows east across the border with Canada, then north to form the headwaters of the Klutlan River. Its native name was reported in 1891 by C. W. Hayes of the United States Geological Survey.

== See also ==
- List of glaciers
