= Porphyry Mountain =

Mountain in Alaska

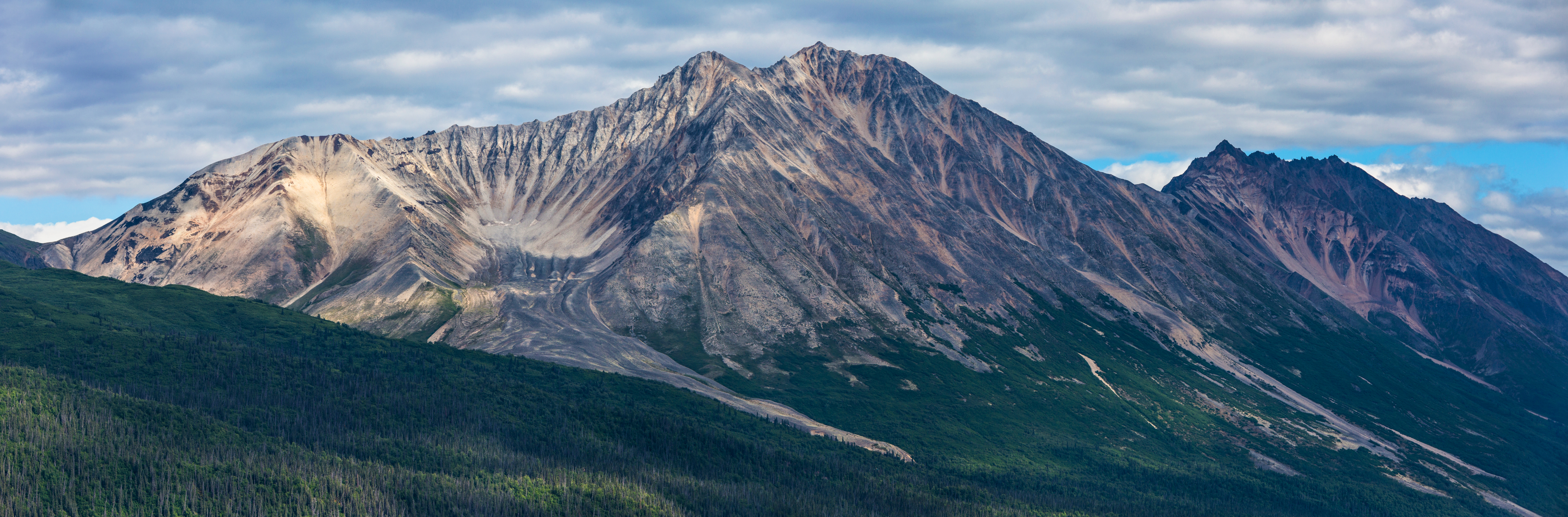
- Northwest aspect of Porphyry Mountain featuring the National Creek Rock Glacier

Highest point
- Elevation: 6,375 ft (1,943 m)
- Prominence: 1,675 ft (511 m)
- Parent peak: Bonanza Peak
- Isolation: 3.42 mi (5.50 km)
- Coordinates: 61°28′16″N 142°49′50″W

Geography
- Location within Alaska
- Interactive map of Porphyry Mountain
- Location: Wrangell-St. Elias National Park; Copper River Census Area; Alaska, United States
- Parent range: Wrangell Mountains
- Topo map: USGS McCarthy B-5

Porphyry Mountain is a prominent 6,375-foot (1,943 meter) mountain summit located in the Wrangell Mountains, in the U.S. state of Alaska. The peak is situated in Wrangell-St. Elias National Park and Preserve, immediately southeast of Kennecott, 4 mi (6 km) northeast of McCarthy, and, 5 mi (8 km) northwest of Sourdough Peak. Precipitation runoff from the mountain drains into tributaries of the Nizina River, which in turn is part of the Copper River drainage basin. The peak is notable for a rock glacier on its north slope. The mountain was so named because it is largely composed of porphyry, which is a very hard igneous rock. The mountain's local name was reported in 1908 by the U.S. Geological Survey. On a clear day the summit of Porphyry Mountain offers views of Donoho Peak, Kennicott Glacier, and Mount Blackburn to the northwest, and Fireweed Mountain to the west.

== Climate ==
Based on the Köppen climate classification, Porphyry Mountain is located in a subarctic climate zone with long, cold, snowy winters, and cool summers. Weather systems coming off the Gulf of Alaska are forced upwards by the Wrangell Mountains (orographic lift), causing heavy precipitation in the form of rainfall and snowfall. Temperatures can drop below −20 °C with wind chill factors below −30 °C. The months May through June offer the most favorable weather for viewing and climbing.

== Gallery ==
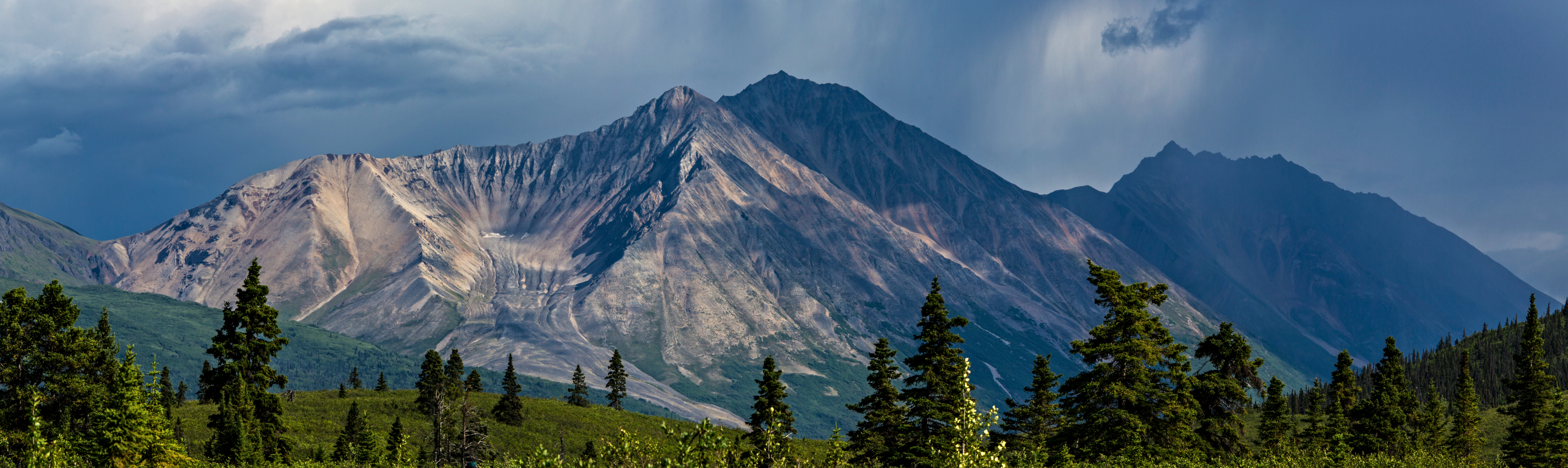
Porphyry Mountain and National Creek Rock Glacier from Donoho Basin

== See also ==
- List of mountain peaks of Alaska
- Geography of Alaska
- Kennecott, Alaska
