= Fireweed Mountain =

Mountain summit in Alaska, U.S.

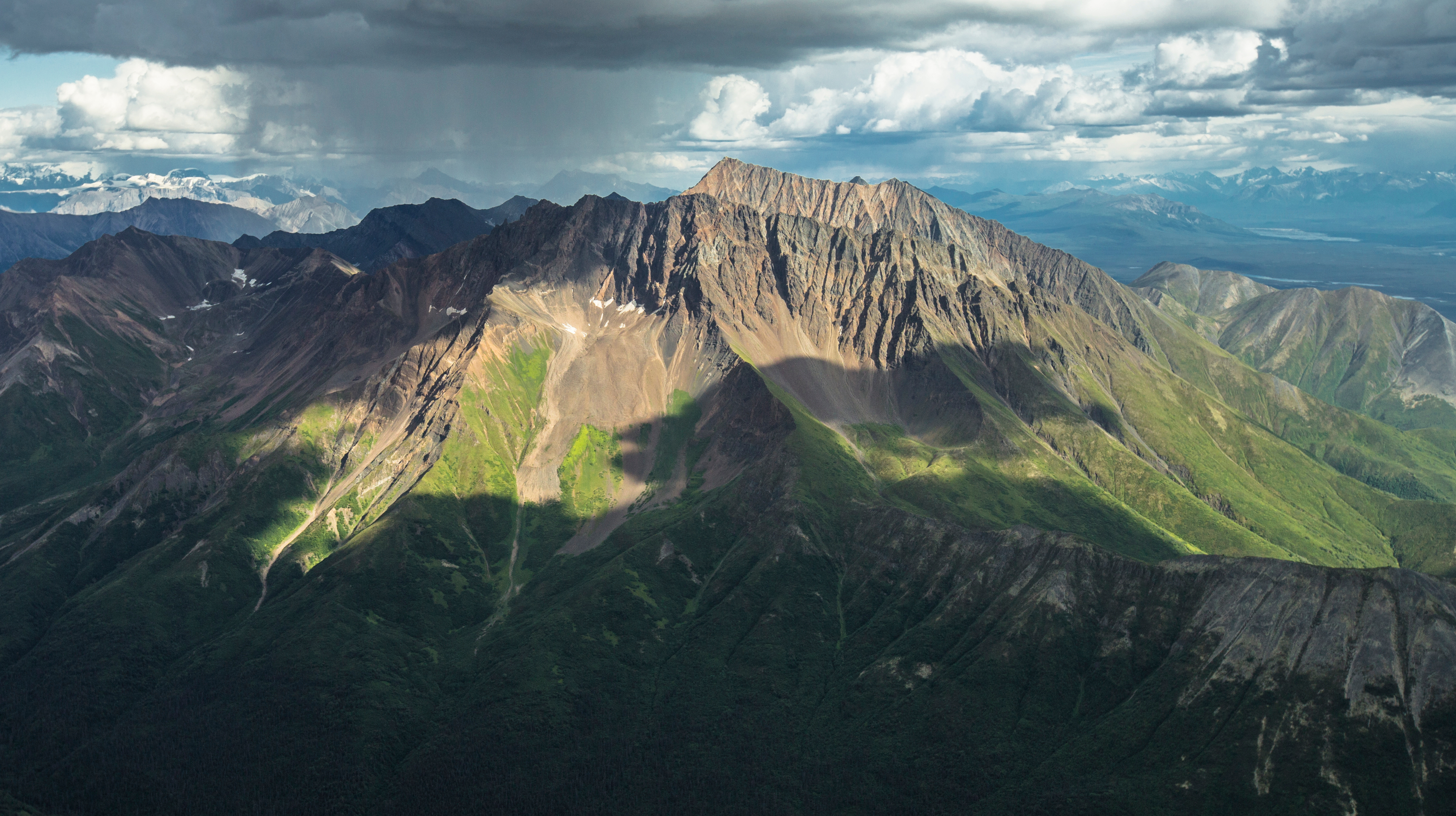
- Aerial view from west-northwest

Highest point
- Elevation: 6,956 ft (2,120 m)
- Prominence: 3,356 ft (1,023 m)
- Parent peak: Bonanza Peak
- Isolation: 8.62 mi (13.87 km)
- Coordinates: 61°27′58″N 143°08′49″W

Geography
- Location within Alaska
- Interactive map of Fireweed Mountain
- Location: Wrangell-St. Elias National Park; Copper River Census Area; Alaska, United States
- Parent range: Wrangell Mountains
- Topo map: USGS McCarthy B-6

Fireweed Mountain is a prominent 6,956-foot (2,120 meter) mountain summit located in the Wrangell Mountains, in the U.S. state of Alaska. The peak is situated in Wrangell-St. Elias National Park and Preserve, immediately west of the terminus of the Kennicott Glacier, and 5 mi (8 km) west-northwest of McCarthy. Precipitation runoff from the eight-mile-long by five-mile-wide mountain drains into tributaries of the Chitina River, which in turn is part of the Copper River drainage basin. The mountain's name was given in the 1920s by Molly Gilmore, a lifelong resident of the McCarthy area, who at age 17, named the mountain for the abundance of fireweed which grew on the mountain following forest fires. Although fireweed is the most common and well-known flower in Alaska, it is not commemorated on any other Alaskan mountain. The mountain's name was officially adopted in 1966 by the U.S. Board on Geographic Names. On a clear day the summit of Fireweed Mountain offers views of Mount Blackburn to the northwest, and Regal Mountain to the northeast.

== Climate ==
Based on the Köppen climate classification, Fireweed Mountain is located in a subarctic climate zone with long, cold, snowy winters, and cool summers. Weather systems coming off the Gulf of Alaska are forced upwards by the Wrangell Mountains (orographic lift), causing heavy precipitation in the form of rainfall and snowfall. Temperatures can drop below −20 °C with wind chill factors below −30 °C. The months May through June offer the most favorable weather for viewing and climbing.

== Gallery ==
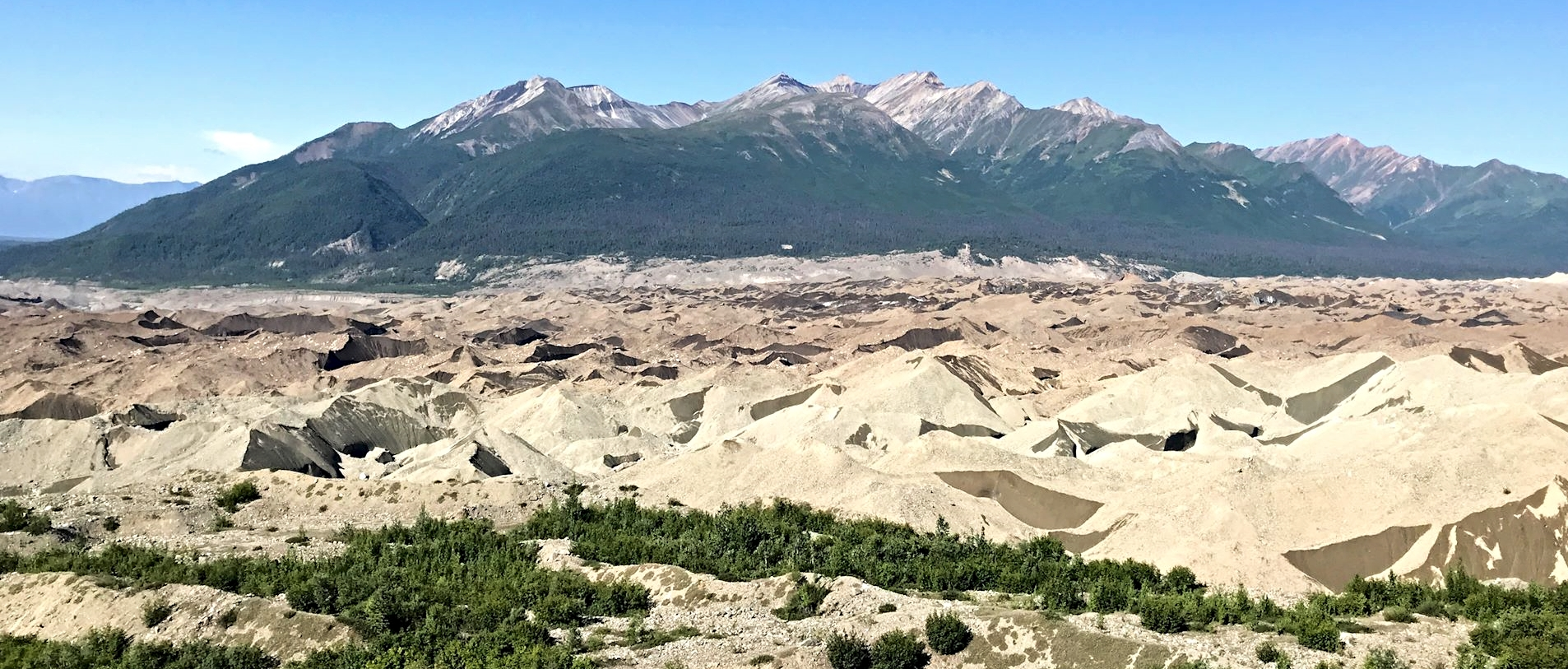
Fireweed Mountain across the Kennicott Glacier from Kennecott

== See also ==
- List of mountain peaks of Alaska
- Geography of Alaska
- Kennecott, Alaska
