= Donoho Peak =

Mountain in Alaska

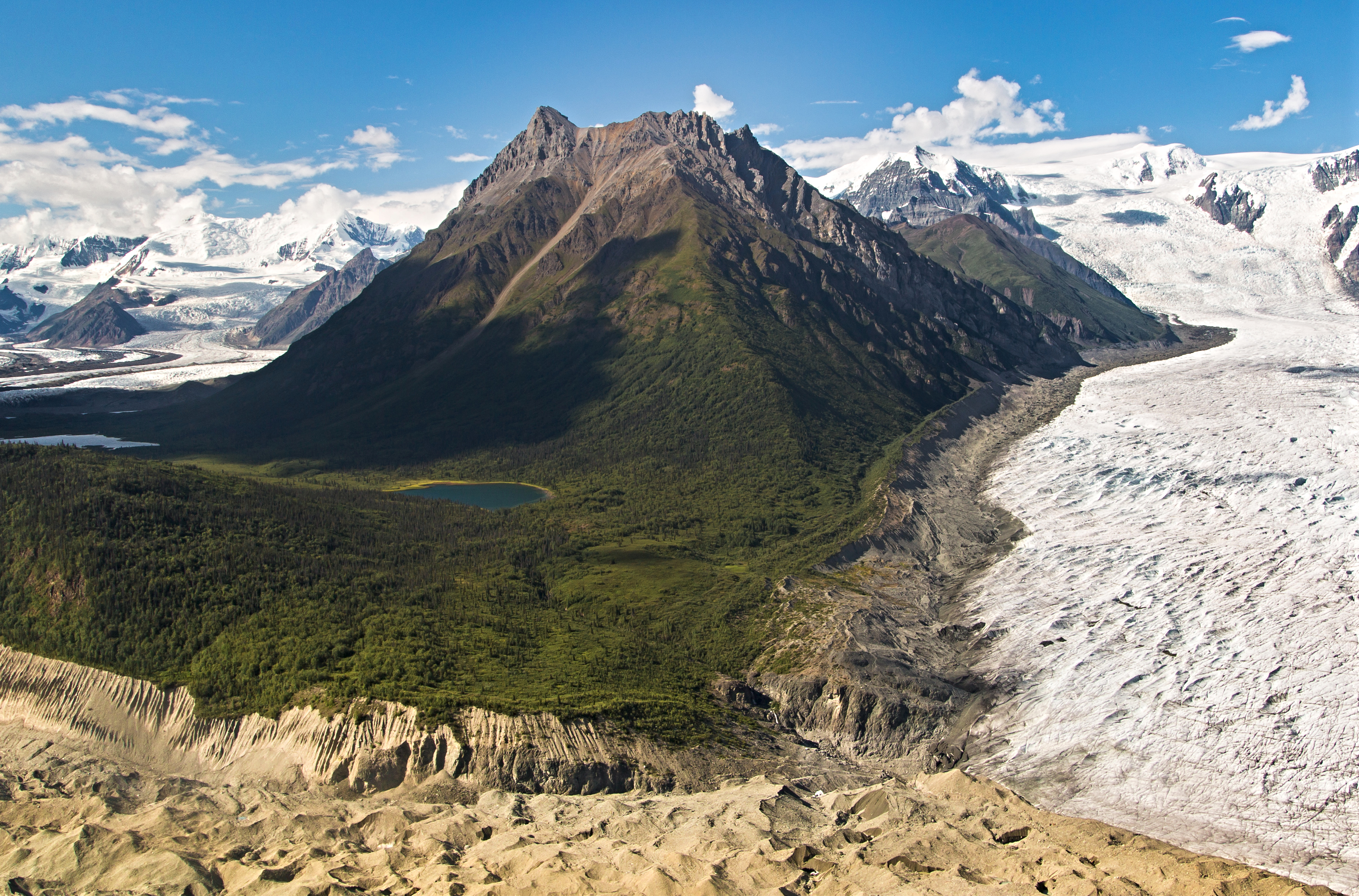
- Donoho Peak, south aspect

Highest point
- Elevation: 6,696 ft (2,041 m)
- Prominence: 1,496 ft (456 m)
- Parent peak: Bonanza Peak
- Isolation: 3.68 mi (5.92 km)
- Coordinates: 61°33′25″N 142°58′20″W

Geography
- Location within Alaska
- Interactive map of Donoho Peak
- Location: Wrangell-St. Elias National Park; Copper River Census Area; Alaska, United States
- Parent range: Wrangell Mountains
- Topo map: USGS McCarthy C-6

Geology
- Rock age: Cretaceous
- Rock type(s): Greenstone, Limestone

Climbing
- Easiest route: Scrambling, Glacier crossing

Donoho Peak is a 6,696-foot-elevation (2,041-meter) mountain summit located in the Wrangell Mountains, in the U.S. state of Alaska. The peak is situated in Wrangell-St. Elias National Park and Preserve, 6 mi (10 km) north-northwest of Kennecott, and 9 mi (14 km) north of McCarthy, at the confluence of the Kennicott Glacier and Root Glacier. The peak's name was reported in 1931 by the United States Geological Survey. The mountain lies within the Copper River drainage basin. Bears frequent the Donoho Peak and Donoho Lakes area. An ascent of the mountain involves 14 miles round-trip from Kennecott to the summit, including crossing the Root Glacier and gully scramble via the south aspect of the mountain. Ruins of the Regal Mine remain at an elevation of 5,440 feet on the south slope of the mountain. Only small amounts of copper ore were ever produced, however. On a clear day the summit of Donoho Peak offers views of Mount Blackburn to the northwest and the Stairway Icefall on Regal Mountain to the north-northeast.

== Climate ==
Based on the Köppen climate classification, Donoho Peak is located in a subarctic climate zone with long, cold, snowy winters, and cool summers. Weather systems coming off the Gulf of Alaska are forced upwards by the Wrangell Mountains (orographic lift), causing heavy precipitation in the form of rainfall and snowfall. Temperatures can drop below −20 °C with wind chill factors below −30 °C. The months May through June offer the most favorable weather for viewing and climbing.

== Geology ==
Donoho Peak and the ridge extending to the north separate Gates and Root Glaciers. The north-dipping section exposes most of the definitive Triassic and Jurassic units of the Wrangellia Terrane, overlain unconformably at the north end of the ridge by the Miocene Frederika Formation and the Miocene to Holocene Wrangell Lava. The peak is underlain by a conspicuous overturned syncline, which is cored by Nizina limestone, and forms a gray-colored zigzag on the east face of the peak.

== See also ==
- List of mountain peaks of Alaska
- Geography of Alaska
- Kennecott, Alaska

== Gallery ==
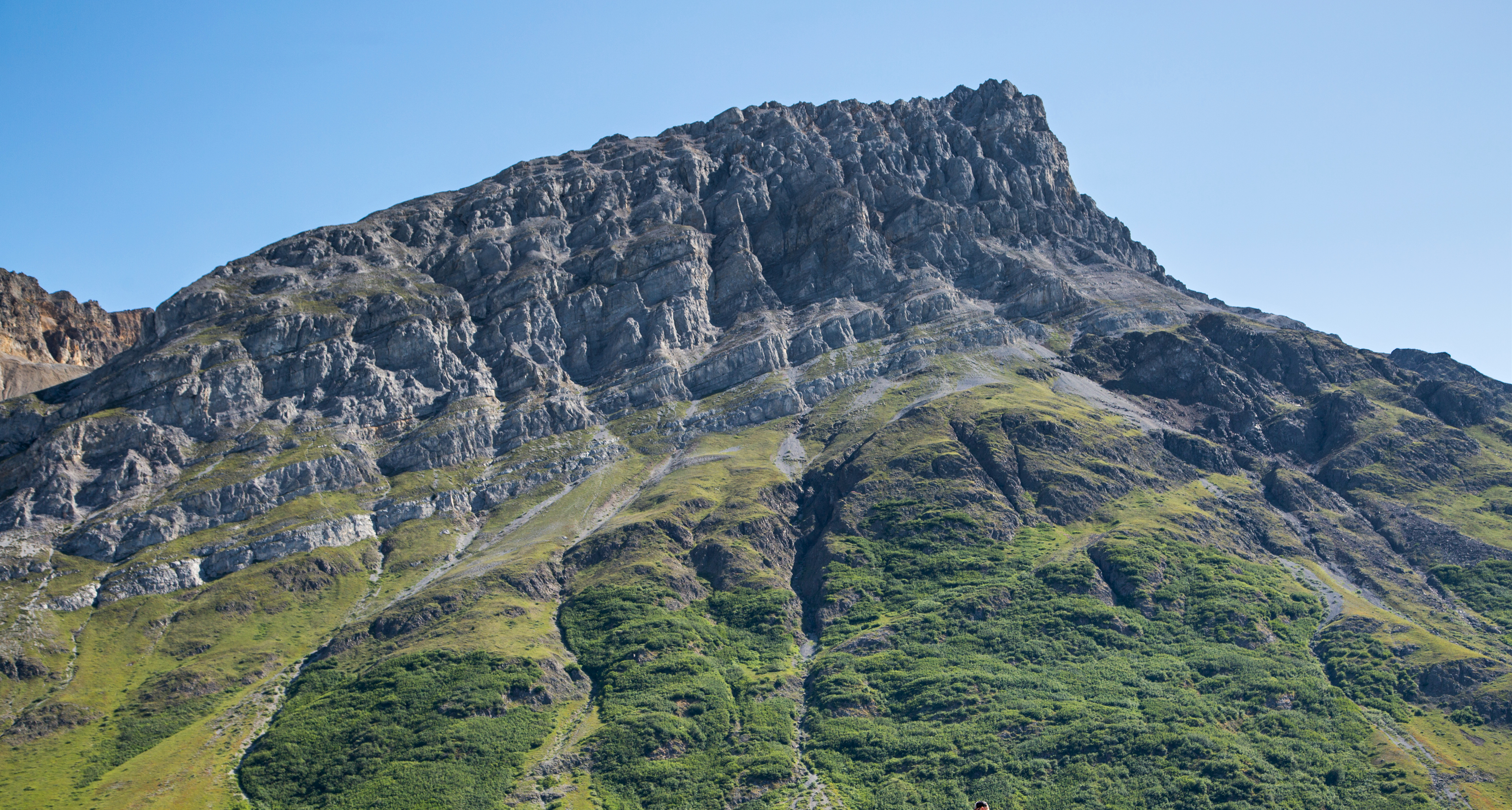
Donoho's west side shows limestone overlying darker greenstone

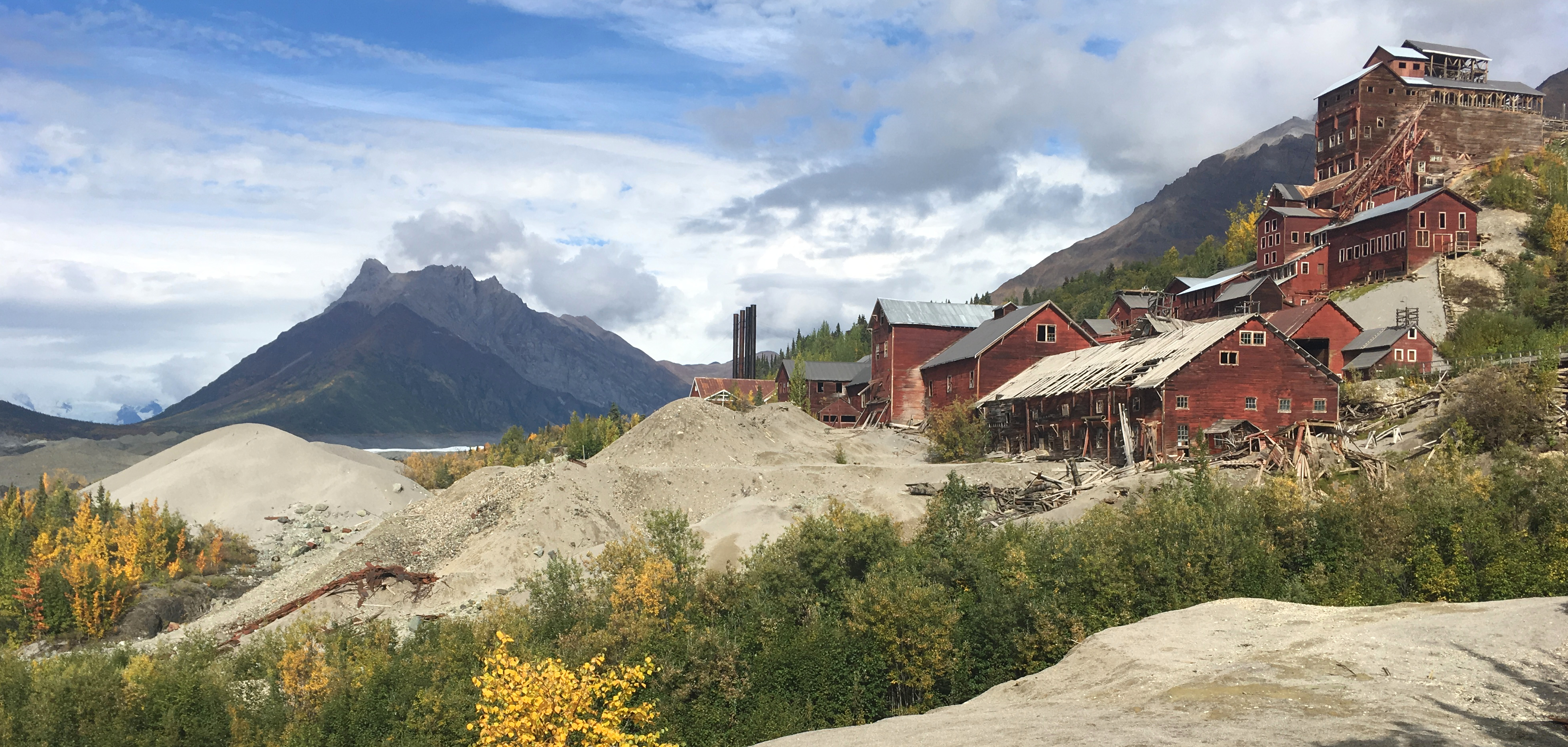
Donoho Peak (left) with historic Kennecott Mill site

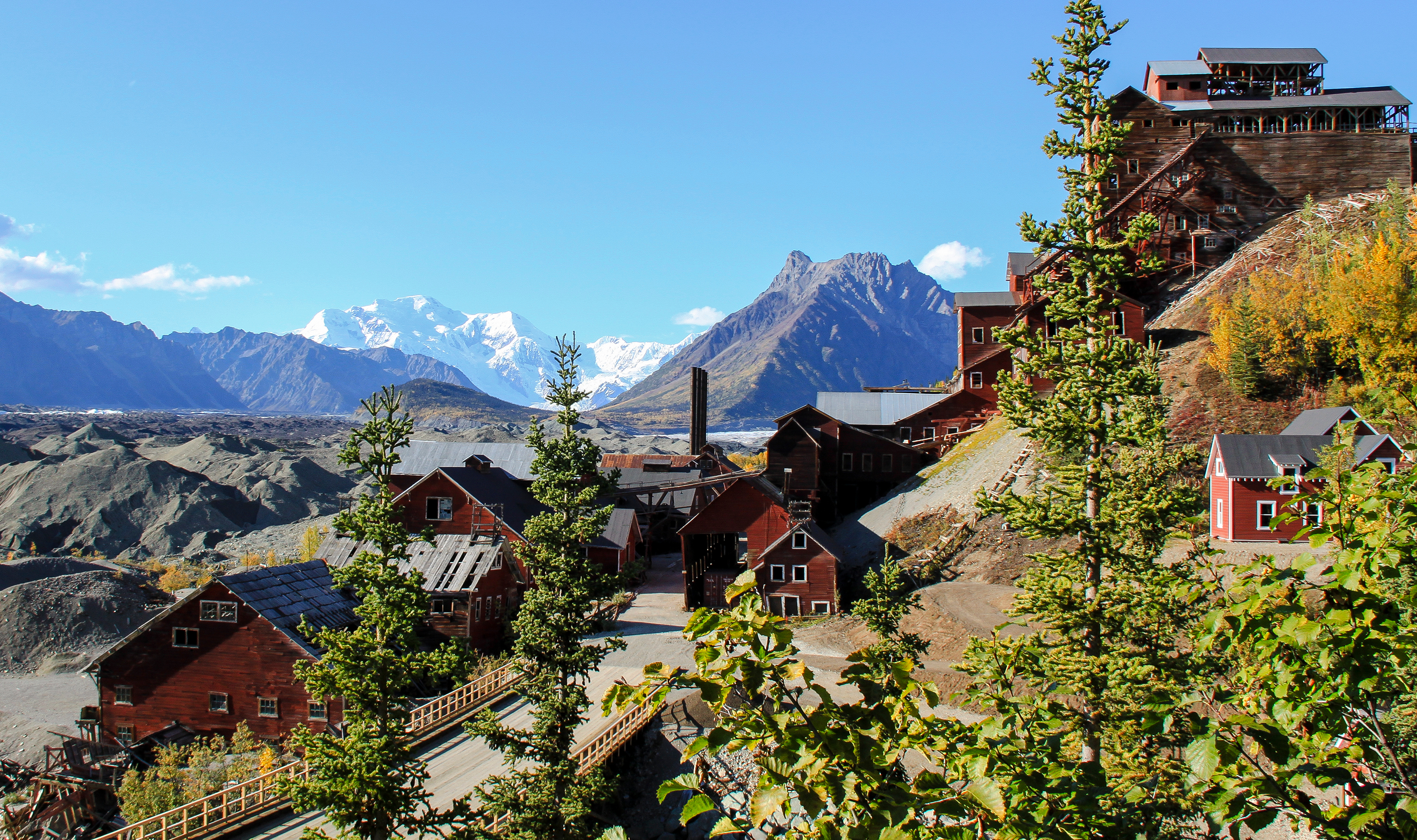
Mt. Blackburn, Donoho Peak, and Kennecott Mill town.

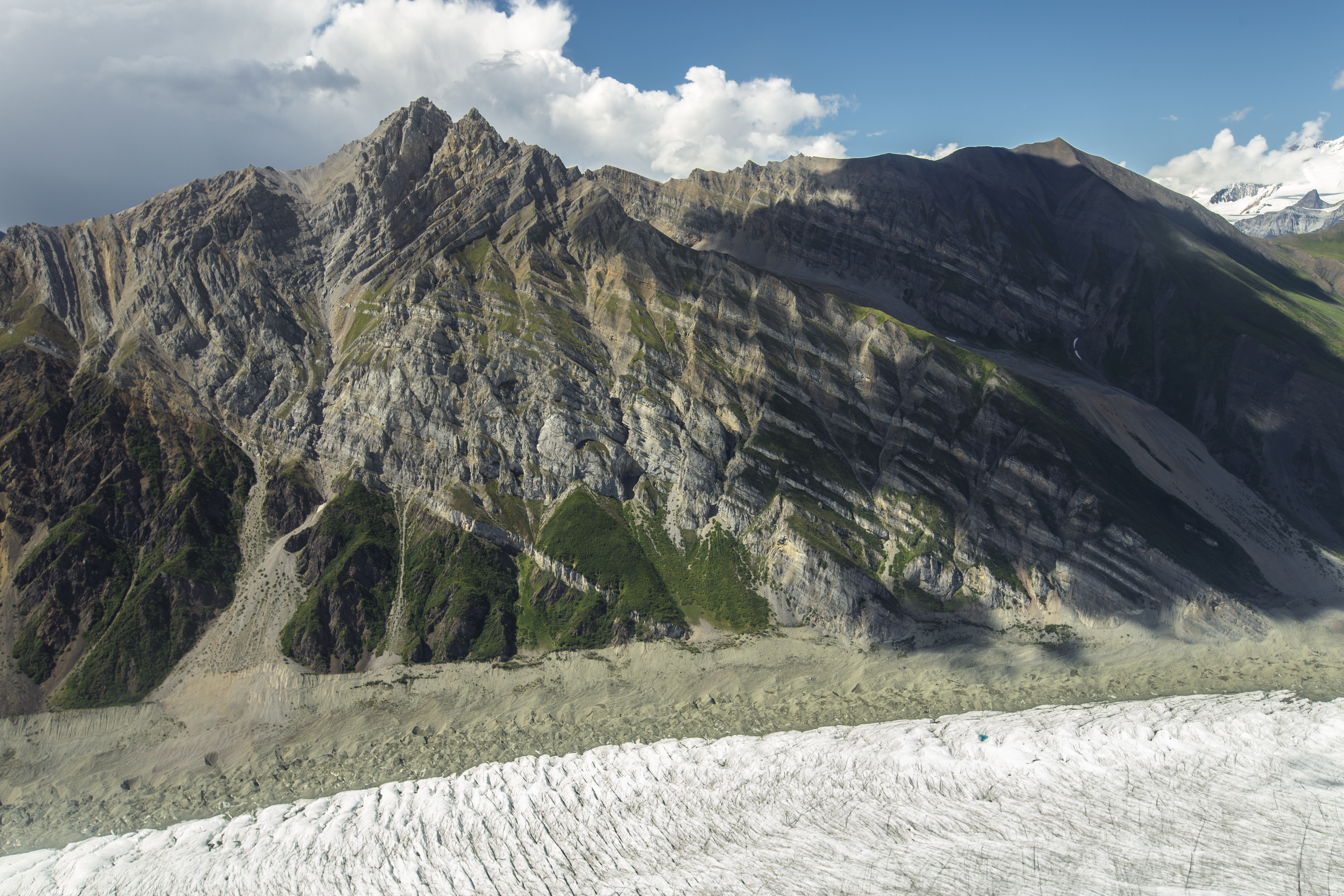
Donoho Peak's east aspect above Root Glacier

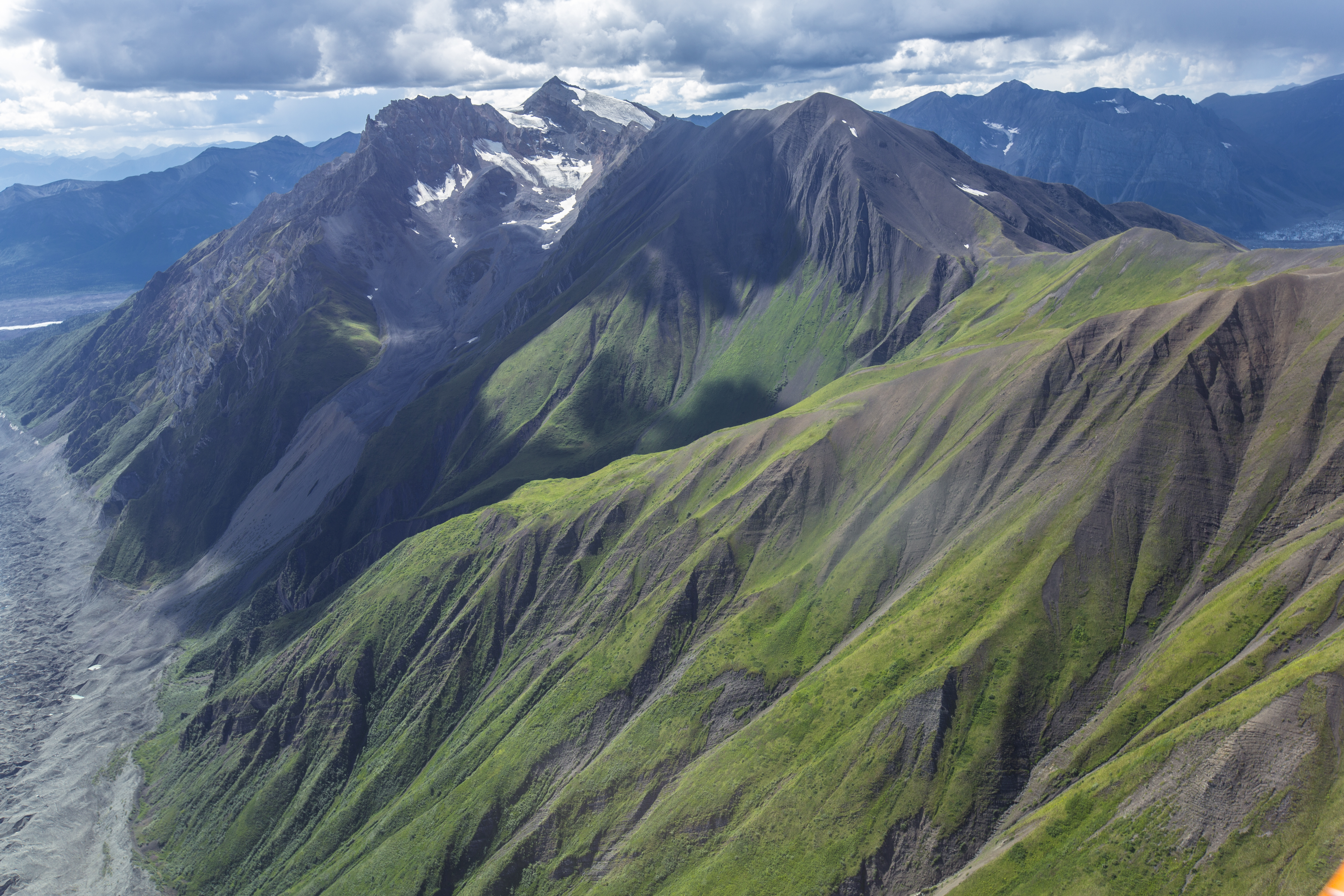
Aerial view of north aspect

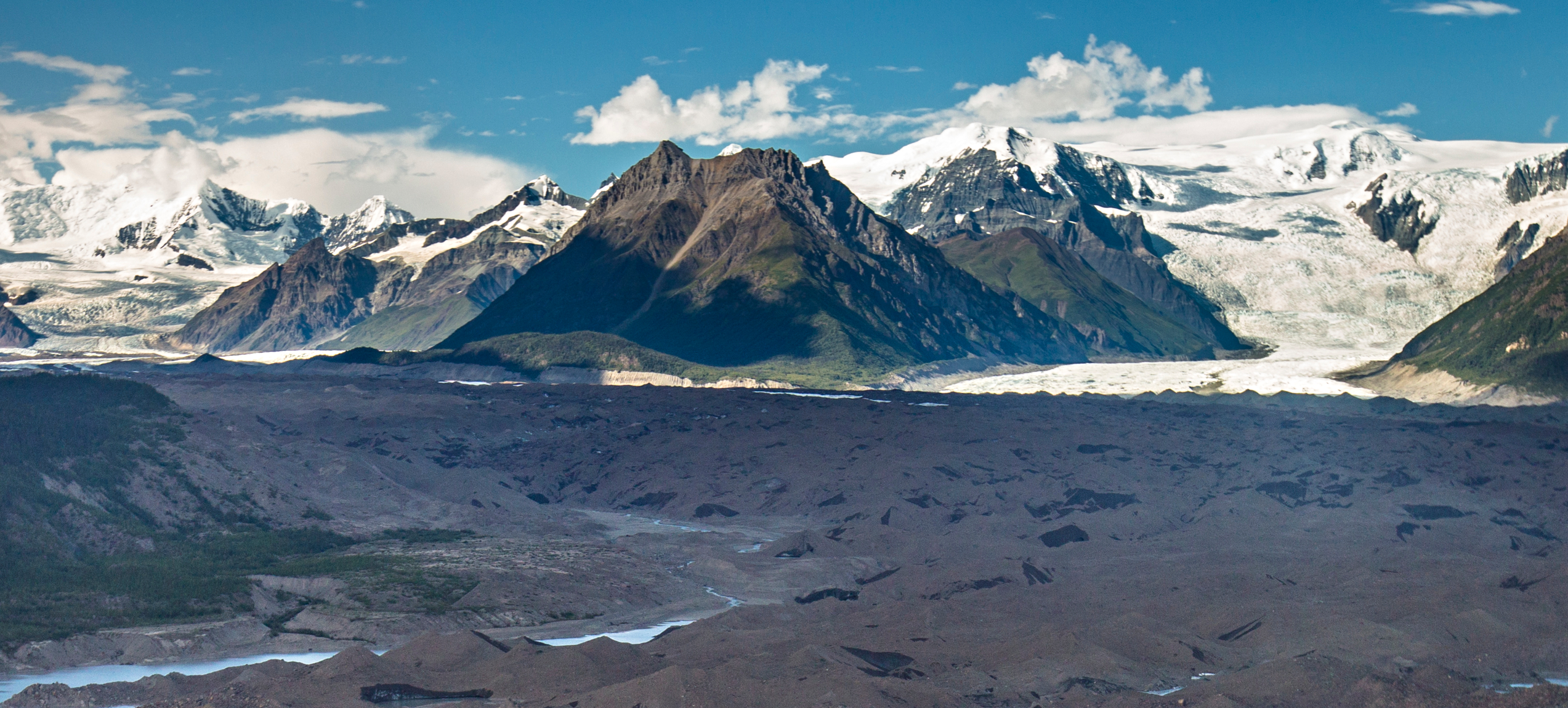
Donoho Peak centered

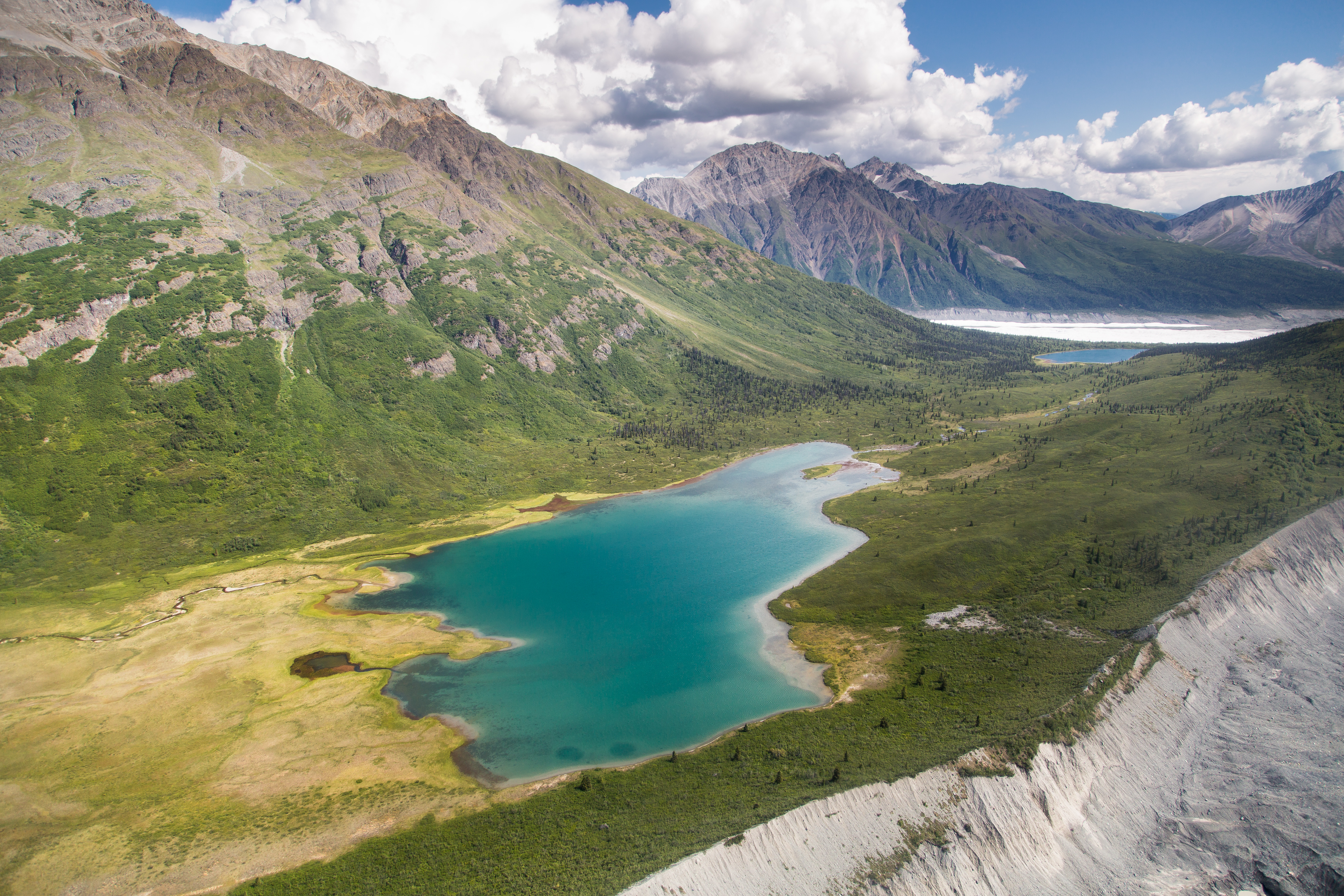
Donoho Lakes in Donoho Basin
