= Bonanza Peak =

Bonanza Peak may refer to:

- Bonanza Peak (Alaska), United States
- Bonanza Peak (Washington), United States
