= Bonanza Peak (Alaska) =

Mountain in Alaska

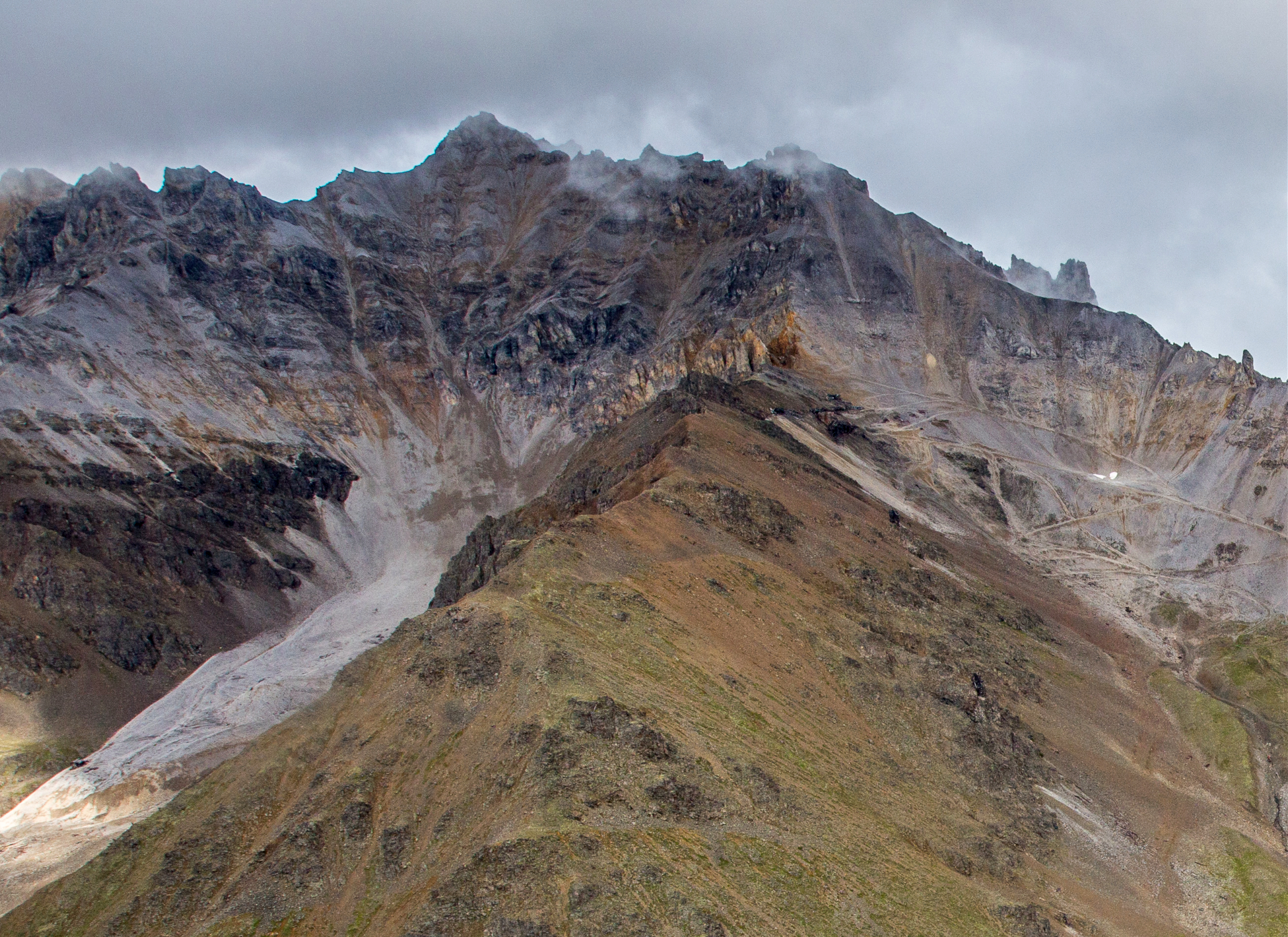
- South aspect of Bonanza Peak

Highest point
- Elevation: 6,983 ft (2,128 m)
- Prominence: 1,583 ft (482 m)
- Parent peak: Peak 12454
- Isolation: 4.94 mi (7.95 km)
- Coordinates: 61°31′14″N 142°50′06″W

Geography
- Location within Alaska
- Interactive map of Bonanza Peak
- Location: Wrangell-St. Elias National Park; Copper River Census Area; Alaska, United States
- Parent range: Wrangell Mountains
- Topo map: USGS McCarthy C-5

Geology
- Rock type(s): Limestone, Greenstone

Bonanza Peak is a 6,983-foot (2,128-meter) mountain summit located in the Wrangell Mountains, in the U.S. state of Alaska. The peak was notable for its abundance of copper deposits which were mined from 1909 through 1938. The peak is situated in Wrangell-St. Elias National Park and Preserve, immediately northeast of Kennecott, 7 mi (11 km) northeast of McCarthy, 3.46 mi (6 km) north of Porphyry Mountain, and 5.2 mi (8 km) southeast of Donoho Peak. The confluence of the Kennicott and Root Glaciers lies below the mountain's west slope. Precipitation runoff from the mountain drains into tributaries of the Nizina River, which in turn is part of the Copper River drainage basin. The mountain's local name was reported in 1914 by the U.S. Geological Survey. On a clear day the summit of Bonanza Peak offers views of Sourdough Peak, Mount Blackburn, and Fireweed Mountain.

== History ==
Bonanza Peak hosted five mines: Bonanza, Jumbo, Mother Lode, Erie, and Glacier. The Bonanza ore body was discovered August 1900 by prospectors "Tarantula" Jack Smith and Clarence L. Warner. Bonanza Mine was located on a ridge south of the summit, and was in the early 1900s, confirmed by Stephen Birch as the richest known concentration of copper in the world. Glacier Mine, which is really an ore extension of the Bonanza, was an open-pit mine and was only mined during the summer. Jumbo Mine was in the west cirque below the summit. The Mother Lode mine was located in a cirque on the east side of the summit. The Erie mine was perched on the northwest slope above the Root Glacier. The Bonanza, Jumbo, Mother Lode and Erie mines were connected by tunnels. From 1909 until 1938, the mines produced over 4.6 million tons of ore containing 1.183 billion pounds of copper mainly from the Bonanza, Jumbo and Mother Lode, as well as several million ounces of silver. The Kennecott operations reported gross revenues above $200 million and a net profit greater than $100 million.

Present-day visitors may hike to the abandoned Bonanza, Jumbo, and Erie mines, all of which are strenuous full-day hikes, with Erie Mine being a somewhat terrifying scramble along cliffs overlooking the Stairway Icefall.

== Geology ==
Bonanza Peak is part of the Wrangellia Terrane. Copper deposits are found at the disconformity between the Upper Triassic Chitistone limestone and underlying Permian Nikolai greenstone. Copper is found as polymetallic replacement deposits in the fault planes, fractures and joints. Minerals include chalcocite, bornite and chalcopyrite, with associated malachite, azurite, and cuprite. Native copper can also be found in the greenstone. The deposits were mined for their spectacularly high-grade copper ore which exceeded 70 percent.

== Climate ==
Based on the Köppen climate classification, Bonanza Peak is located in a subarctic climate zone with long, cold, snowy winters, and cool summers. Weather systems coming off the Gulf of Alaska are forced upwards by the Wrangell Mountains (orographic lift), causing heavy precipitation in the form of rainfall and snowfall. Temperatures can drop below −20 °C with wind chill factors below −30 °C. The months May through June offer the most favorable weather for viewing and climbing.

== Gallery ==
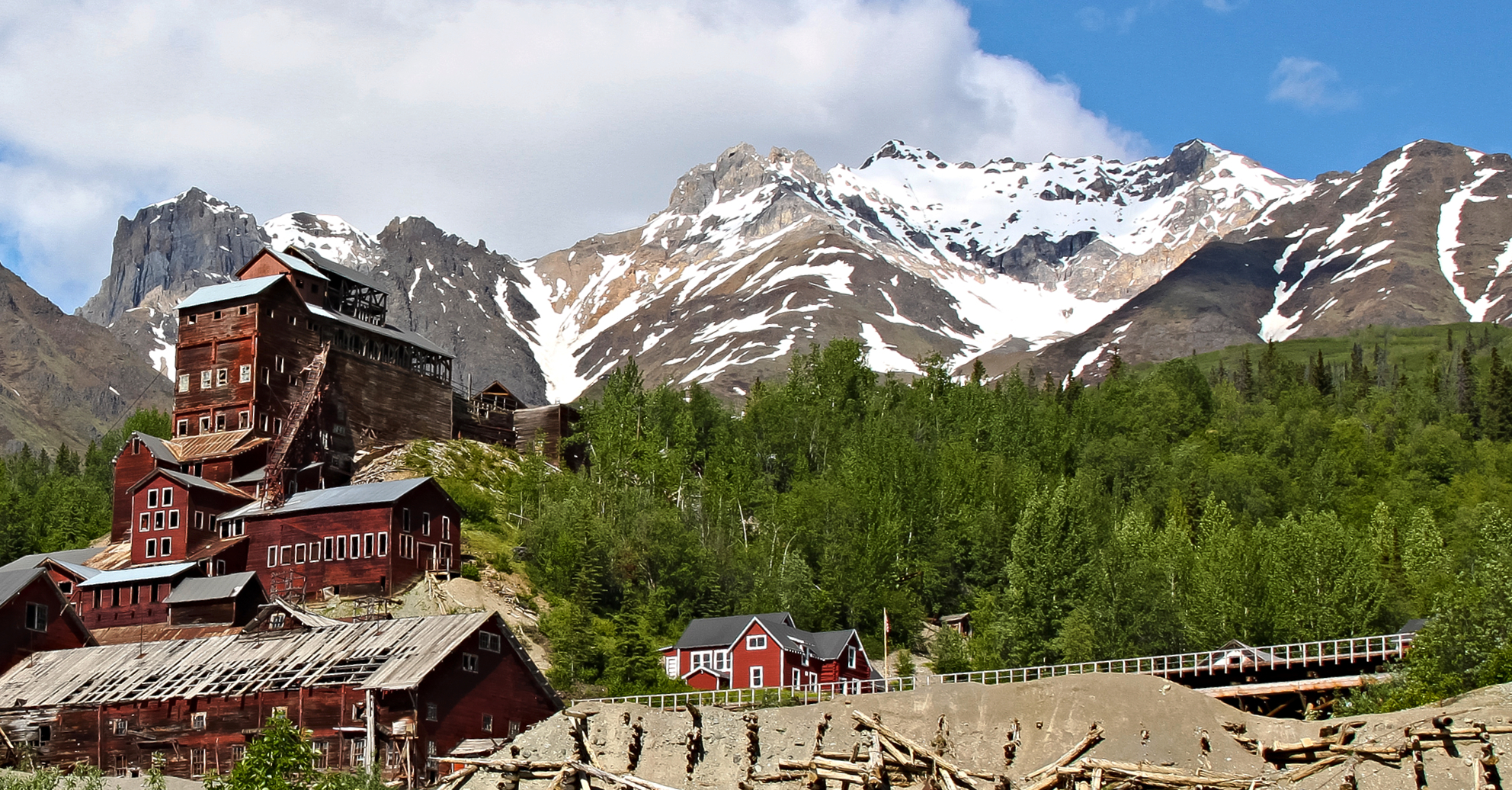
Kennecott Mill site with Bonanza Peak

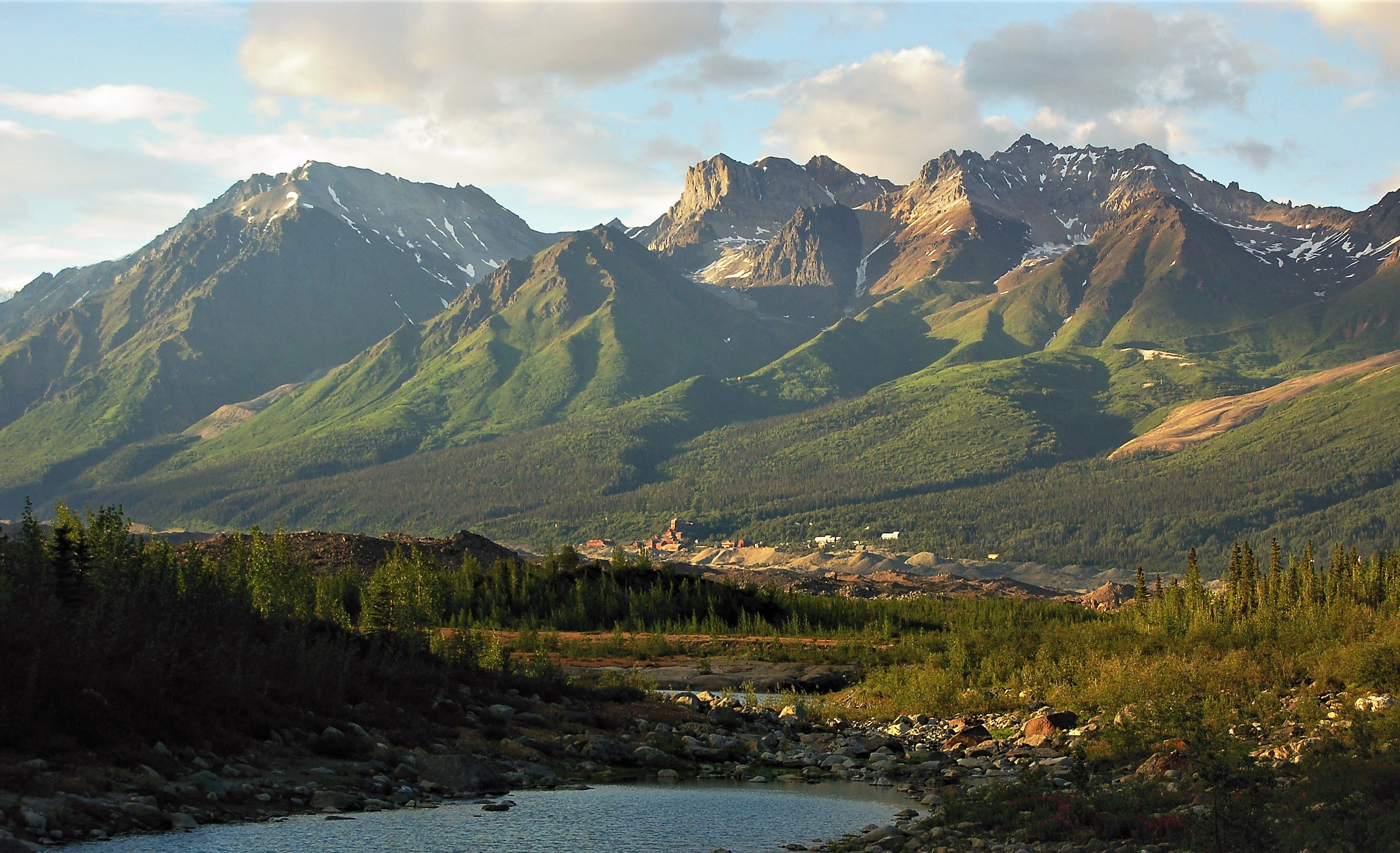
Bonanza Peak and Kennecott

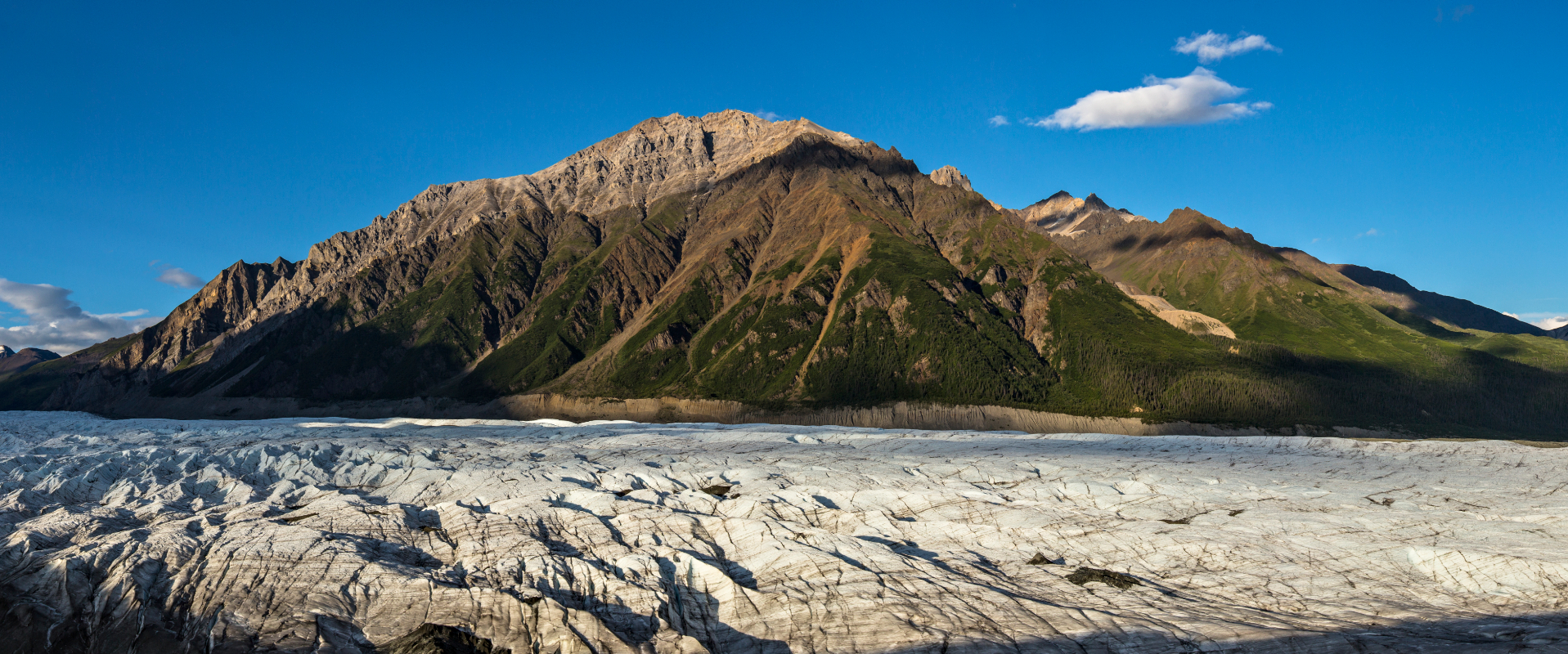
West aspect of Bonanza across Root Glacier

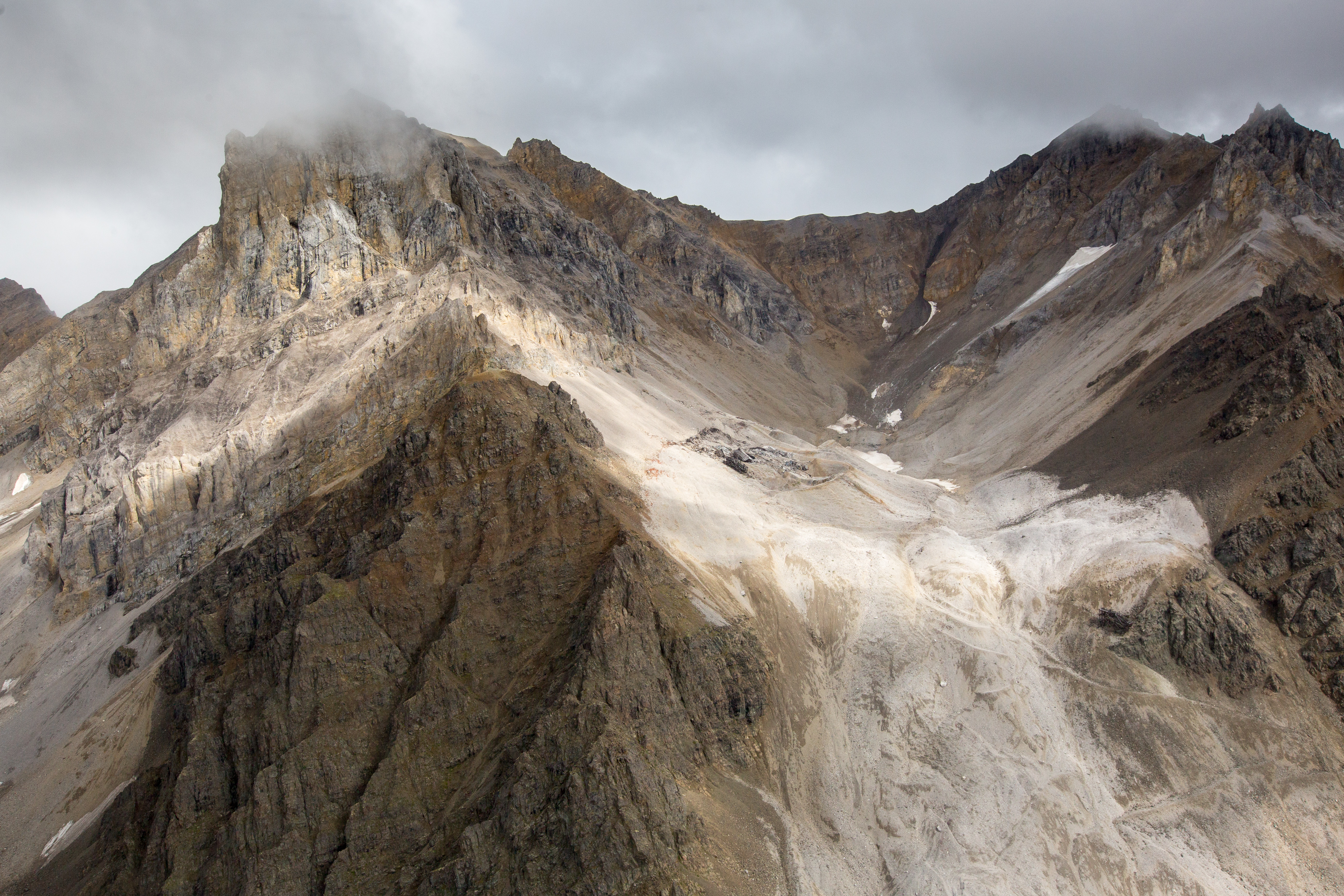
Jumbo Mine ruins in bullseye, summit in upper right.

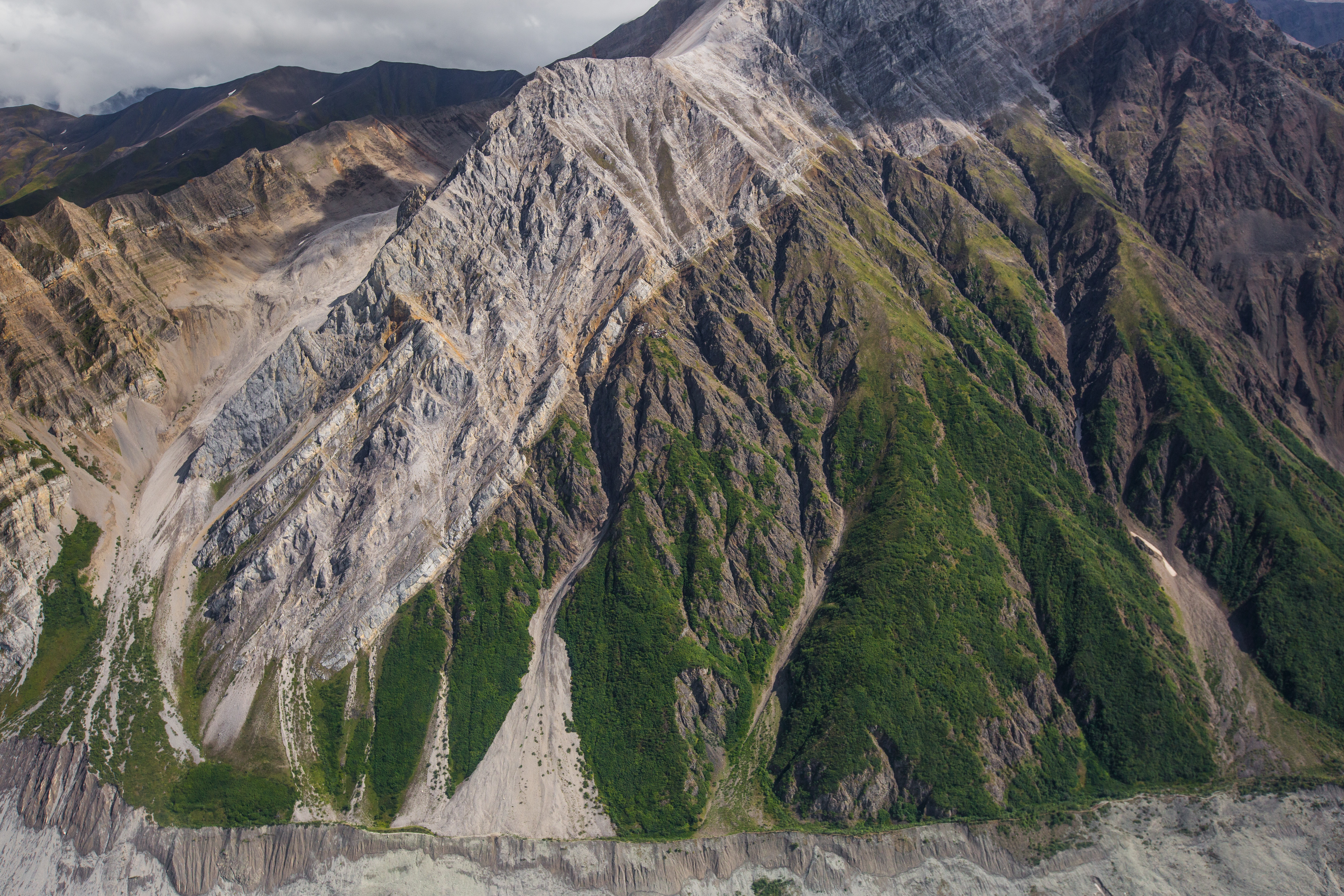
Erie Mine ruins in bullseye at contact line of limestone overlaying greenstone

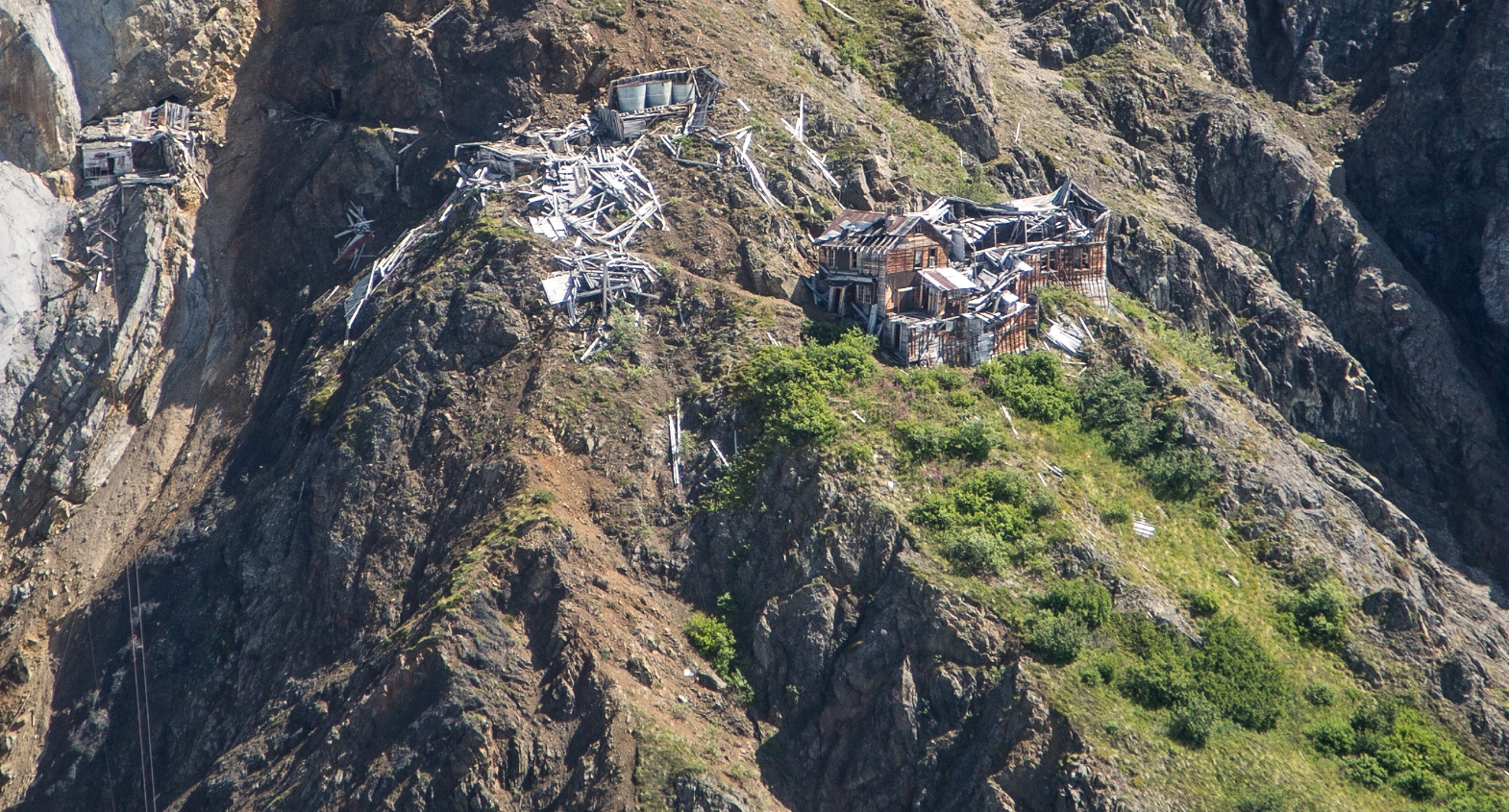
Erie Mine ruins

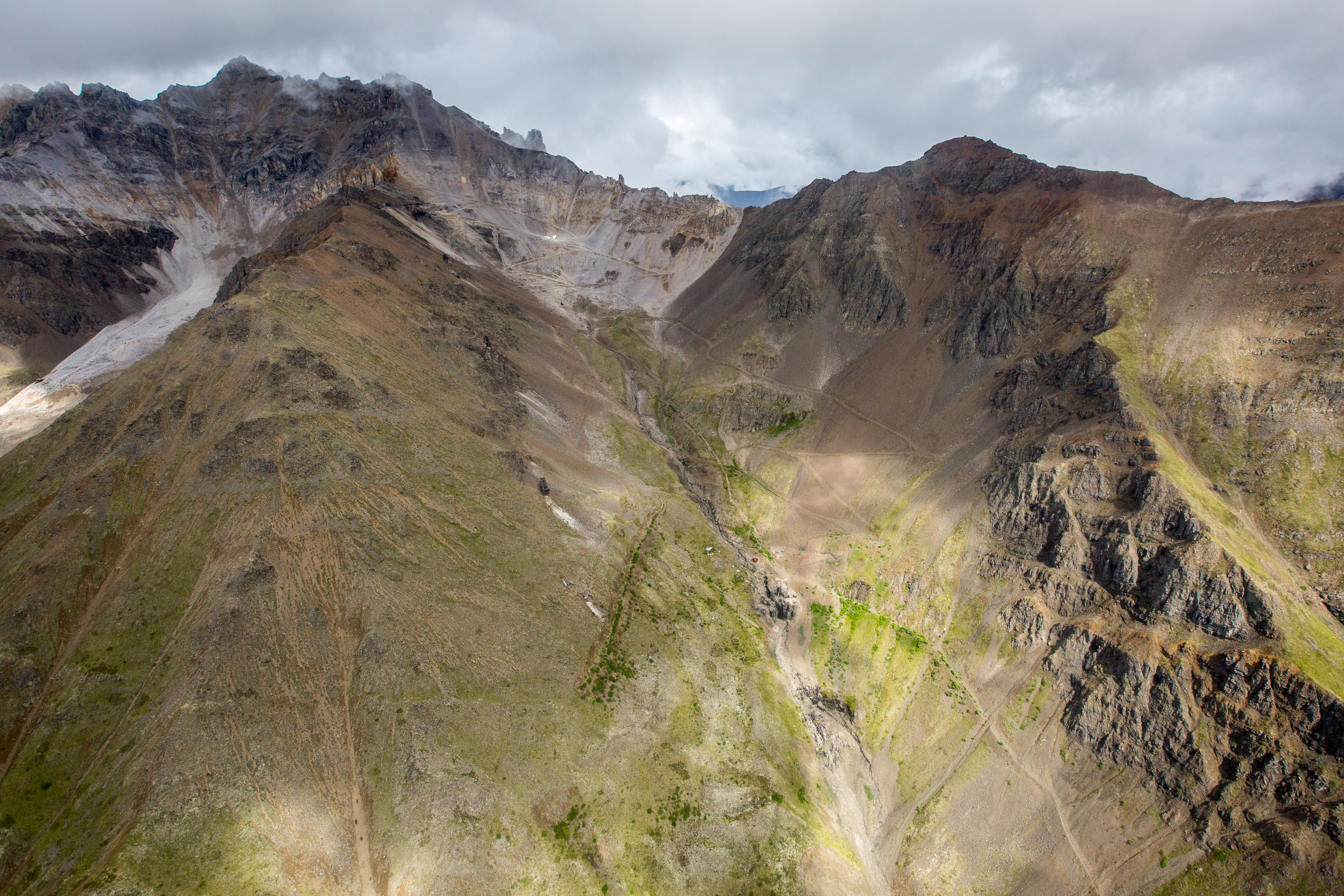
Old route to the Bonanza Mine

== See also ==
- List of mountain peaks of Alaska
- Geography of Alaska
- Kennecott, Alaska
