= Packsaddle Island =

Island in Wrangell-St. Elias National Park, Alaska, United States

- Location within Alaska

Highest point
- Elevation: 5,640 ft (1,720 m)
- Coordinates: 61.6513°N 143.1251°W

Geography
- Location: Wrangell-St. Elias National Park, Alaska

Packsaddle Island 5,640 ft (1,720 m) is a nunatak located in Wrangell–St. Elias National Park and Preserve, in Alaska. It is surrounded by the Kennicott Glacier, and sits near the base of Mount Blackburn 16,390 ft (5,000 m).
