= Regal Mountain =

Mountain in Alaska, United States

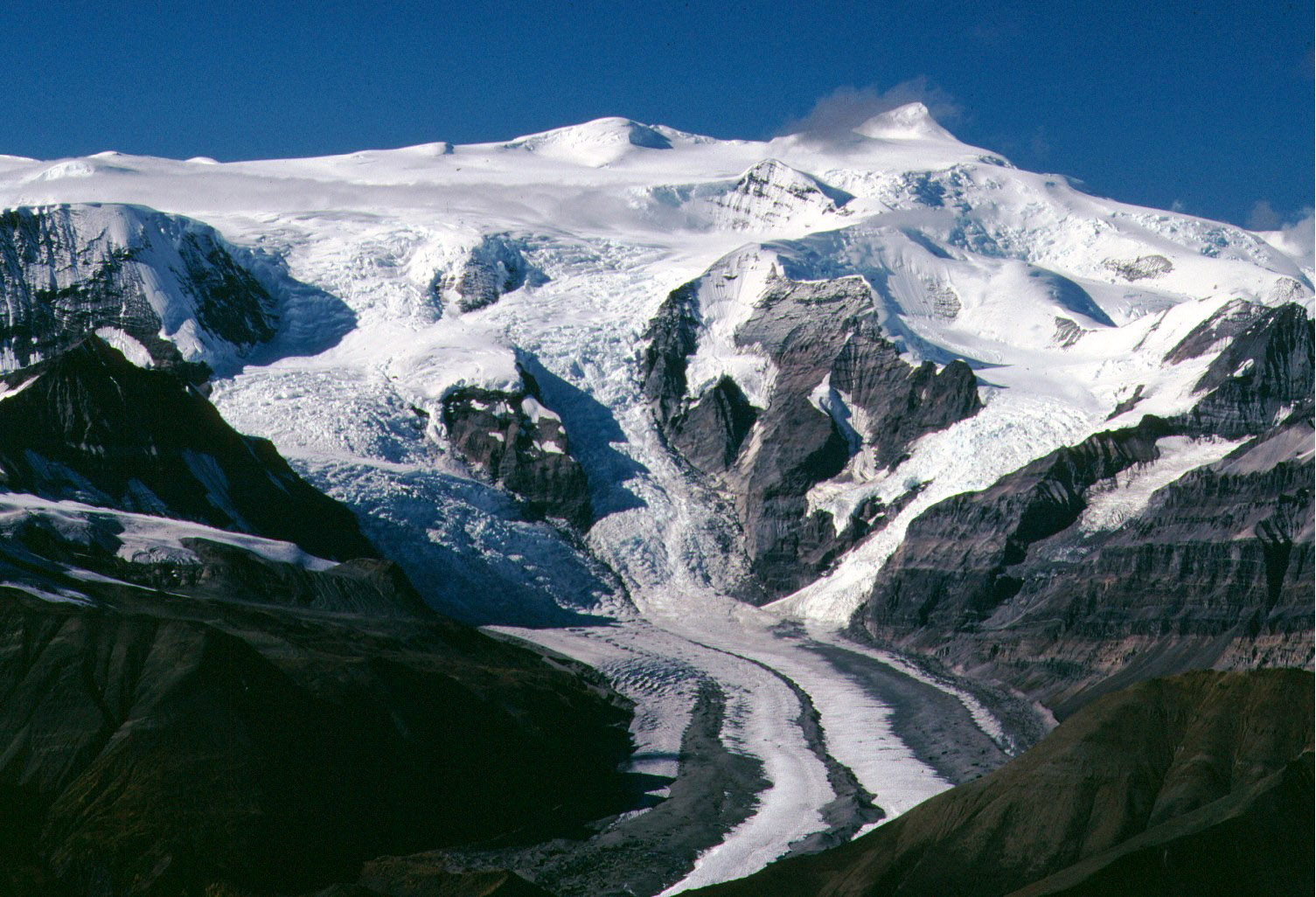
- Regal Mountain rises above the Regal Glacier

Highest point
- Elevation: 13,845 ft (4,220 m)
- Prominence: 4,345 ft (1,324 m)
- Isolation: 12 mi (19 km)
- Listing: North America highest peaks 70th; US highest major peaks 52nd; Alaska highest major peaks 16th
- Coordinates: 61°44′39″N 142°51′55″W

Geography
- Location: Wrangell-St. Elias National Park and Preserve, Alaska, U.S.
- Parent range: Wrangell Mountains
- Topo map: USGS McCarthy C-5

Geology
- Mountain type: Eroded stratovolcano or shield volcano

Climbing
- First ascent: August 3, 1964 by Yasuichi Kitamura, Ryoichi Hasegawa, Masao Tanaka, and Shinichi Naito
- Easiest route: Glacier climb

Regal Mountain is an eroded stratovolcano or shield volcano in the Wrangell Mountains of eastern Alaska. It is located in Wrangell-Saint Elias National Park about 19 mi (31 km) east of Mount Blackburn, the second highest volcano in the United States, and southeast of the massive Nabesna Glacier. Regal Mountain is the third highest thirteener (a peak between 13,000 and 13,999 feet in elevation) in Alaska, ranking just behind its neighbor, Atna Peaks. Because the mountain is almost entirely covered in glaciers, no geological studies have been done, but published references state and the geological map shows that the mountain is an old eroded volcanic edifice.

Several major glaciers flow from the steep and heavily eroded flanks of Regal Mountain. The Rohn Glacier and Regal Glacier head east and southeast to join the Nizina Glacier, while the Root Glacier flows south 15 miles (24 km) to join the Kennicott Glacier just above the town of McCarthy. Each of those large glaciers exceeds 1 mile (1.6 km) in width, but largest of all on Regal Mountain is a massive unnamed glacier, over 3 miles (5 km) across, which flows northwest just over 10 mi (16 km) to join the mighty Nabesna.

== Gallery ==
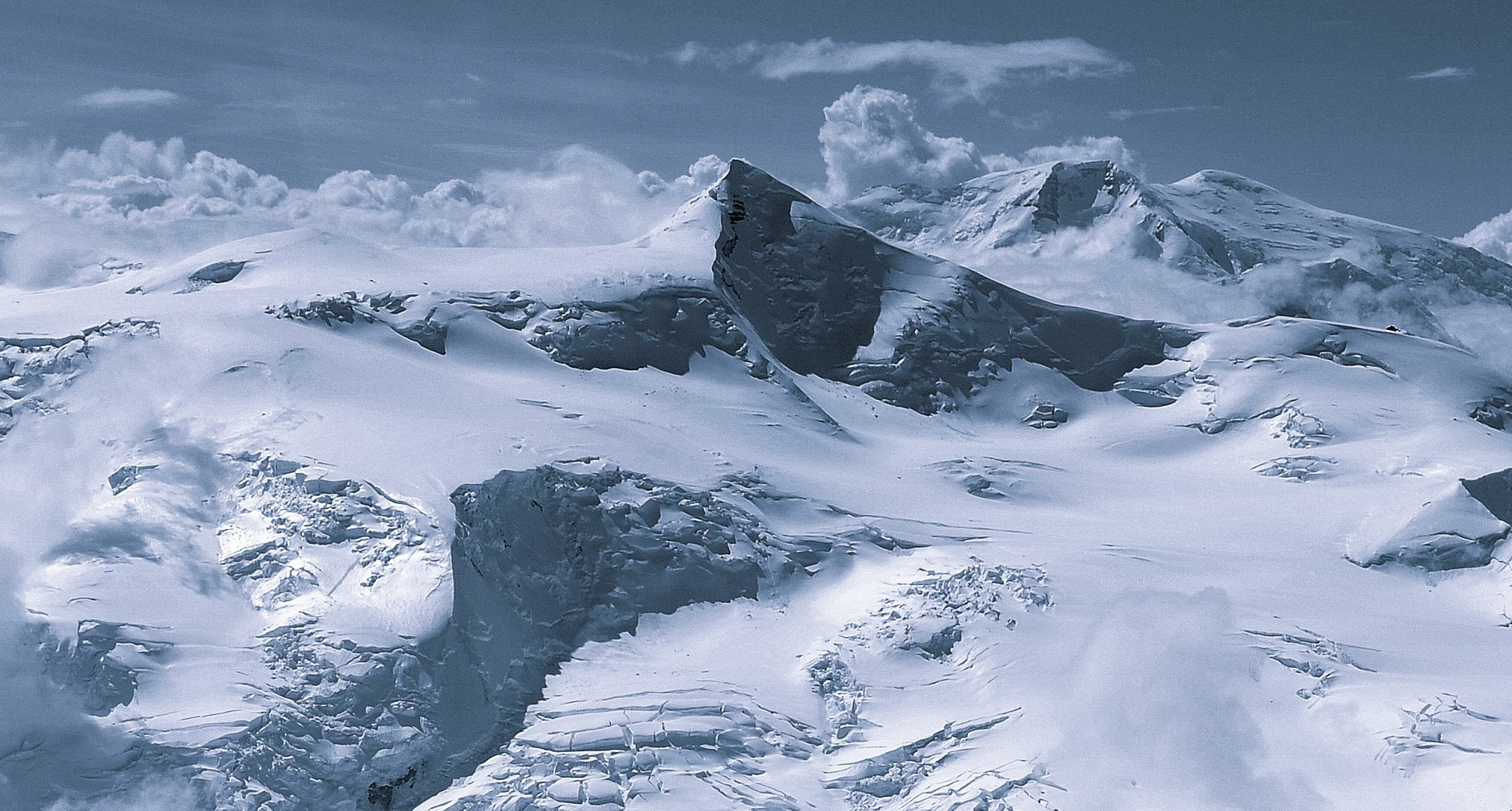
Regal Mountain summit centered, east aspect

== See also ==
- List of mountain peaks of North America
  - List of mountain peaks of the United States
    - List of mountain peaks of Alaska
- List of volcanoes in the United States
