= Sourdough Peak =

Summit in the Wrangell Mountains, Alaska, USA

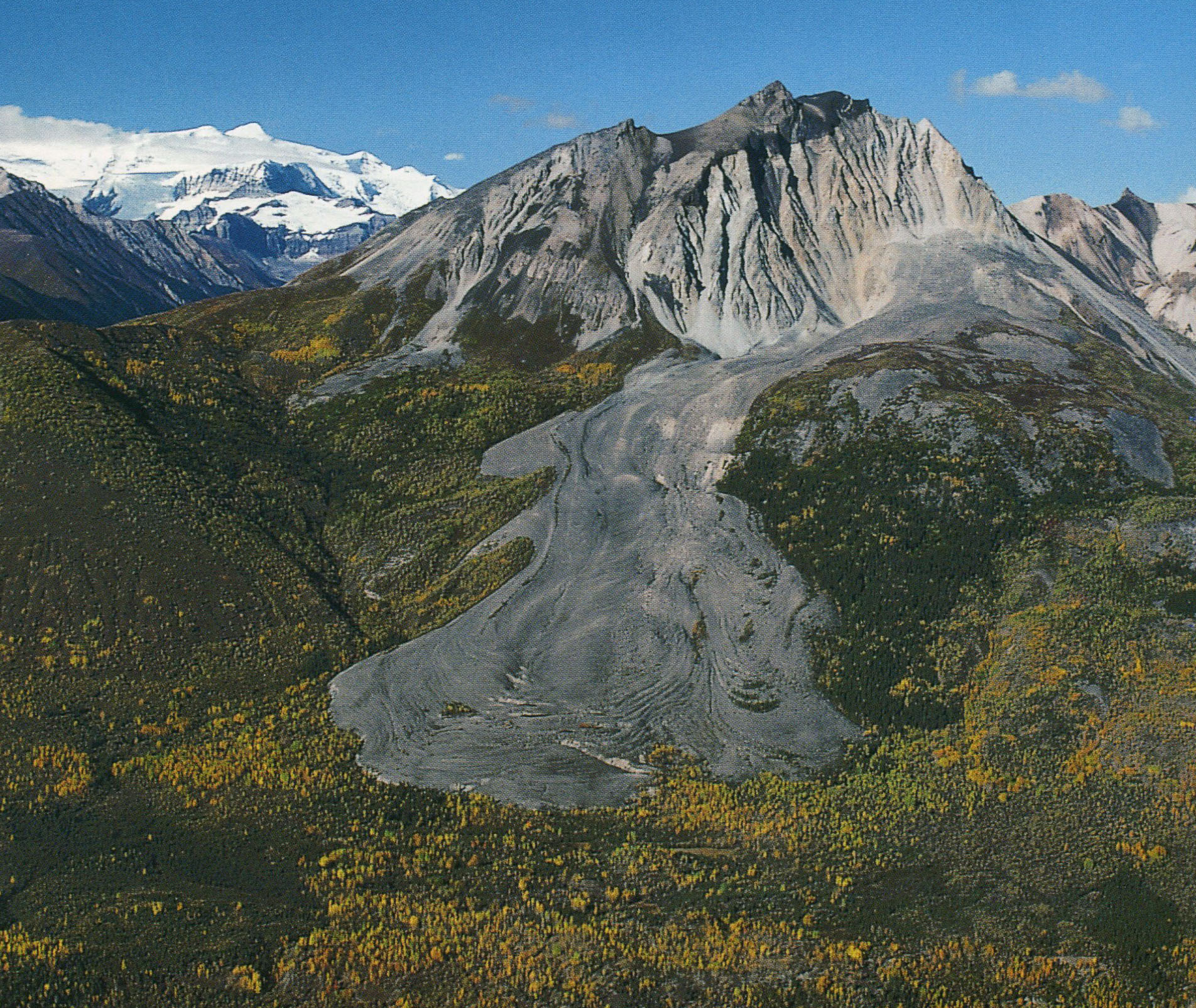
- Sourdough Peak with rock glacier

Highest point
- Elevation: 6,201 ft (1,890 m)
- Prominence: 1,901 ft (579 m)
- Isolation: 3.64 mi (5.86 km)
- Coordinates: 61°24′45″N 142°44′10″W

Geography
- Location within Alaska
- Location: Wrangell-St. Elias National Park; Copper River Census Area; Alaska, United States
- Parent range: Wrangell Mountains
- Topo map: USGS McCarthy B-5

Sourdough Peak is a 6,201-foot (1,890 meter) mountain summit located at the southern edge of the Wrangell Mountains, in the U.S. state of Alaska. The peak is situated in Wrangell-St. Elias National Park and Preserve, 7 mi (11 km) east-southeast of McCarthy, on the north bank of the Nizina River. The peak is notable for a rock glacier on its south slope. The peak's name was used by early prospectors as reported in 1908 by the USGS. A "sourdough" is defined as an experienced prospector or an old-timer in the western US or Canada, because they always carried sourdough starter with them. Sourdough Peak's nearest higher neighbor is Porphyry Mountain, 5.1 miles to the northwest.

== Climate ==
Based on the Köppen climate classification, Sourdough Peak is located in a subarctic climate zone with long, cold, snowy winters, and cool summers. Winds coming off the Gulf of Alaska are forced upwards by the Wrangell Mountains (orographic lift), causing heavy precipitation in the form of rainfall and snowfall. Winter temperatures can drop below −20 °C with wind chill factors below −30 °C. The months May through June offer the most favorable weather for viewing and climbing.

== Gallery ==
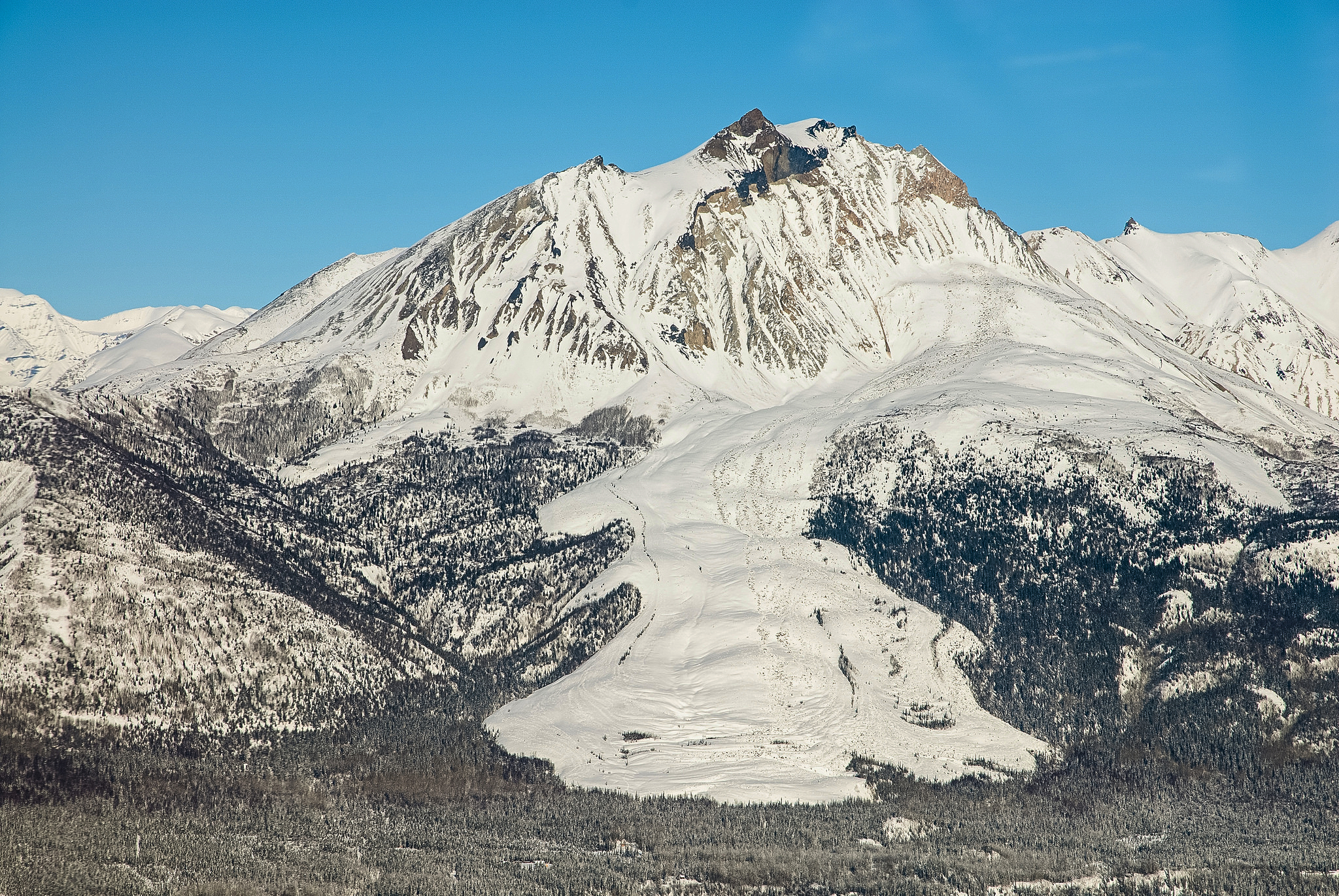
Sourdough Peak

== See also ==
- List of mountain peaks of Alaska
- Geography of Alaska
