= Kennicott Glacier =

Glacier in Alaska

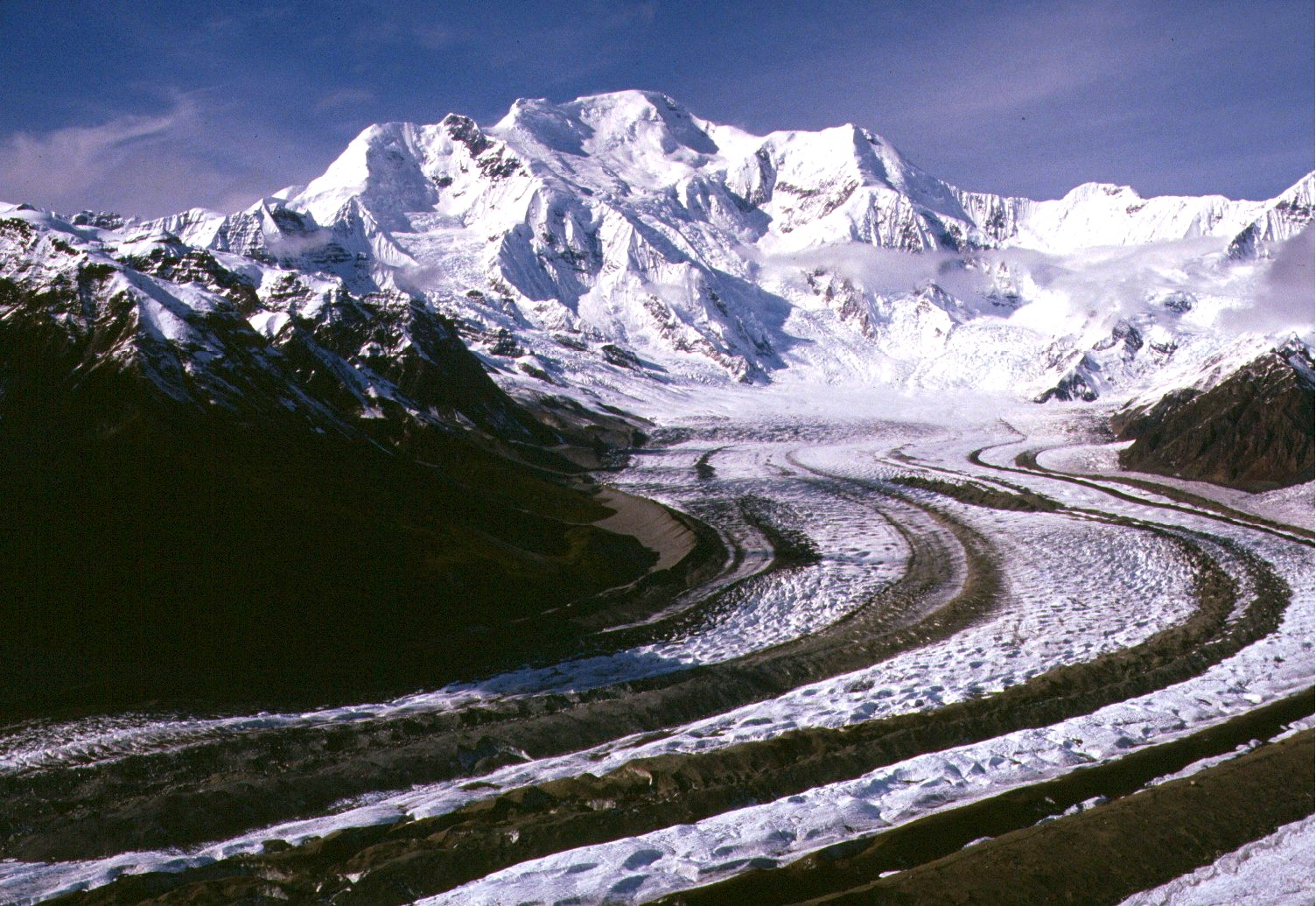
- Kennicott Glacier on approach to Mount Blackburn.

- Location within Alaska
- Interactive map of Kennicott Glacier
- Location: Alaska, U.S.
- Coordinates: 61°36′01″N 143°04′11″W
- Status: Retreating

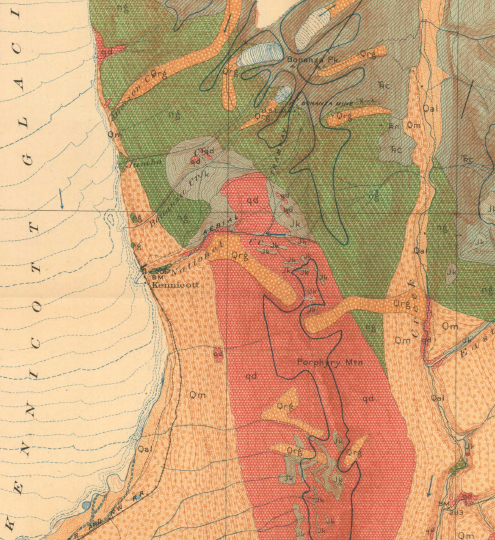
Geologic map depicting the glacier

Kennicott Glacier is a glacier in the U.S. state of Alaska. It trends southeast 43 km (27 mi) from Mount Blackburn to its terminus at the head of the Kennicott River in the Wrangell Mountains. It is located in Wrangell-St. Elias National Park near the small town of McCarthy, Alaska and the historic ghost town of Kennecott, Alaska.

It was named in 1899 by geologist Oscar Rohn of the United States Geological Survey for Robert Kennicott, pioneer Alaska explorer and director of the scientific corps of the Western Union Telegraph Expedition in 1865.

Packsaddle Island is a nunatak located within the glacier near the base of Mount Blackburn.

The glacier is also the namesake of the Alaska Marine Highway vessel M/V Kennicott.

== See also ==
- Packsaddle Island
- List of glaciers
