= Castle Peak (Alaska) =

Mountain summit in the state of Alaska

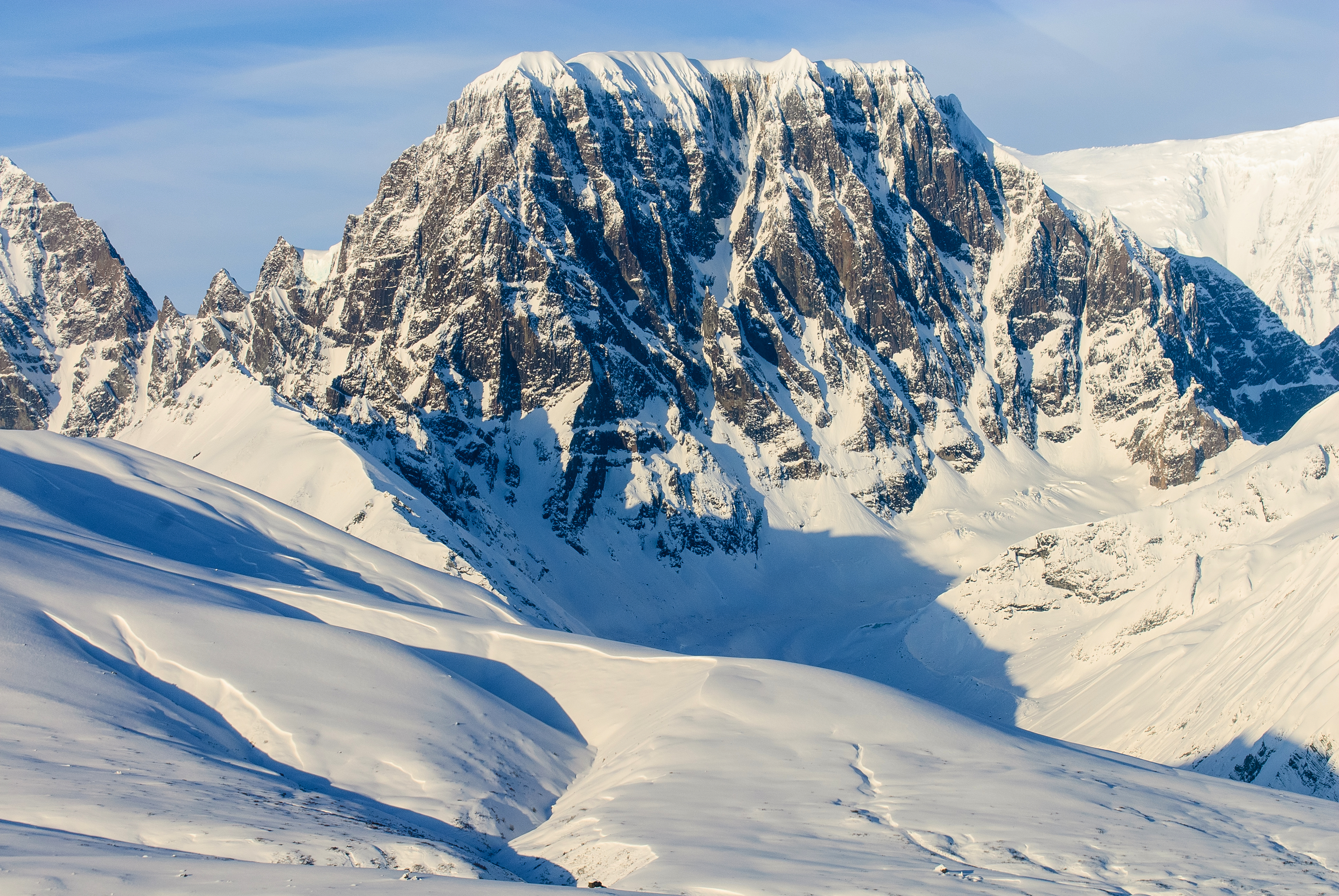
- Aerial view of south aspect

Highest point
- Elevation: 10,190 ft (3,110 m)
- Prominence: 2,200 ft (670 m)
- Parent peak: Mount Blackburn
- Isolation: 4.49 mi (7.23 km)
- Coordinates: 61°35′53″N 143°26′46″W

Geography
- Location within Alaska
- Interactive map of Castle Peak
- Location: Wrangell-St. Elias National Park; Copper River Census Area; Alaska, United States
- Parent range: Wrangell Mountains
- Topo map: USGS McCarthy C-7

Castle Peak is a 10,190-foot (3,110-meter) mountain summit located in the Wrangell Mountains, in the U.S. state of Alaska. The peak is situated in Wrangell-St. Elias National Park and Preserve, 21 mi (34 km) northwest of McCarthy, and 9.3 mi (15 km) south of Mount Blackburn on the south margin of the Kuskulana Glacier valley. Precipitation runoff from the mountain drains into Kuskulana River and Lakina River which are both tributaries of the Chitina River. The peak's descriptive name was used by early prospectors as reported in 1901 by the US Geological Survey.

== Climate ==
Based on the Köppen climate classification, Castle Peak is located in a subarctic climate zone with long, cold, snowy winters, and cool summers. Winds coming off the Gulf of Alaska are forced upwards by the Wrangell Mountains (orographic lift), causing precipitation in the form of rainfall and snowfall. Winter temperatures can drop below −20 °F with wind chill factors below −30 °F. The months May through June offer the most favorable weather for viewing and climbing.

== Gallery ==
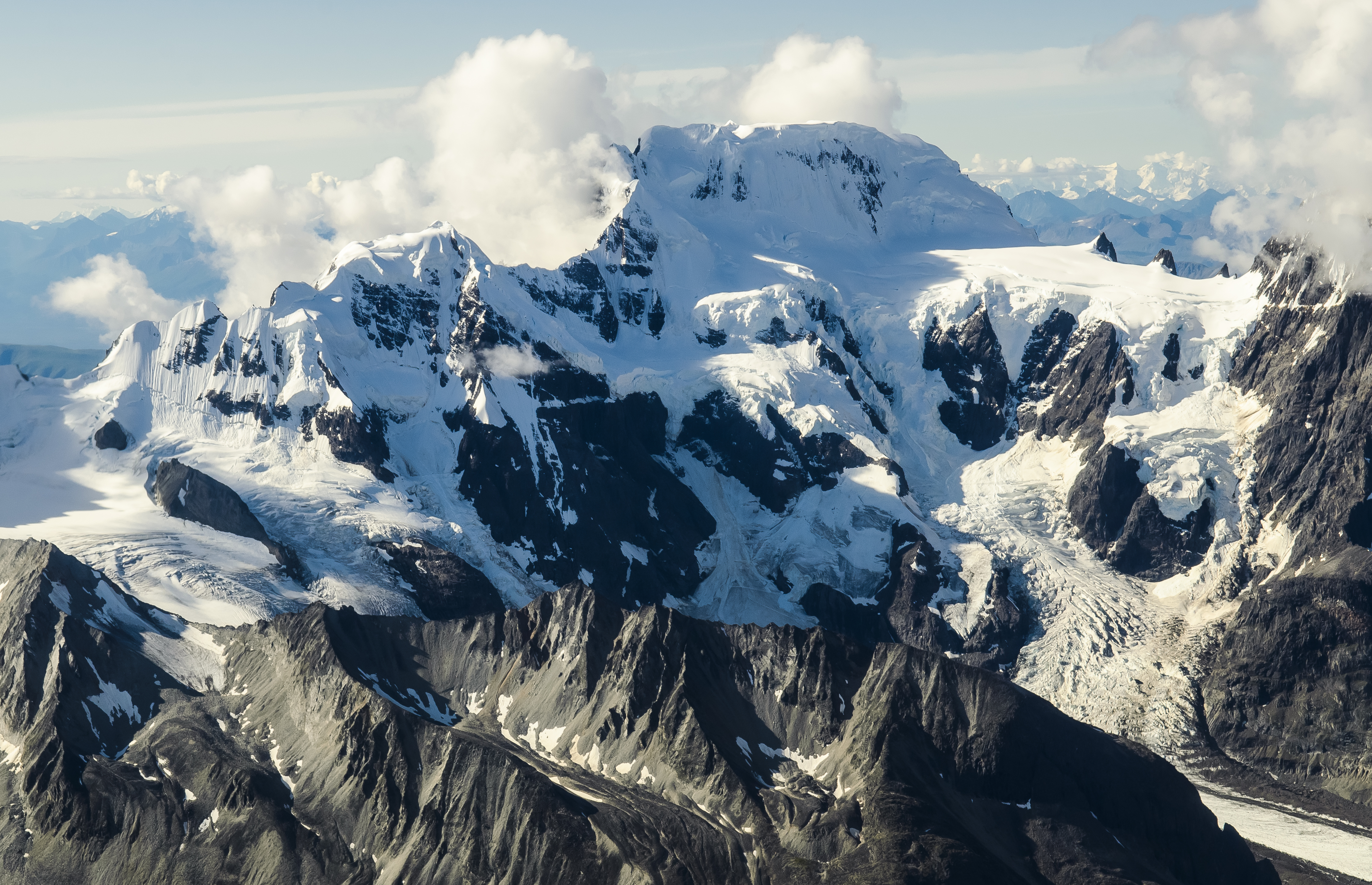
Castle Peak, north aspect

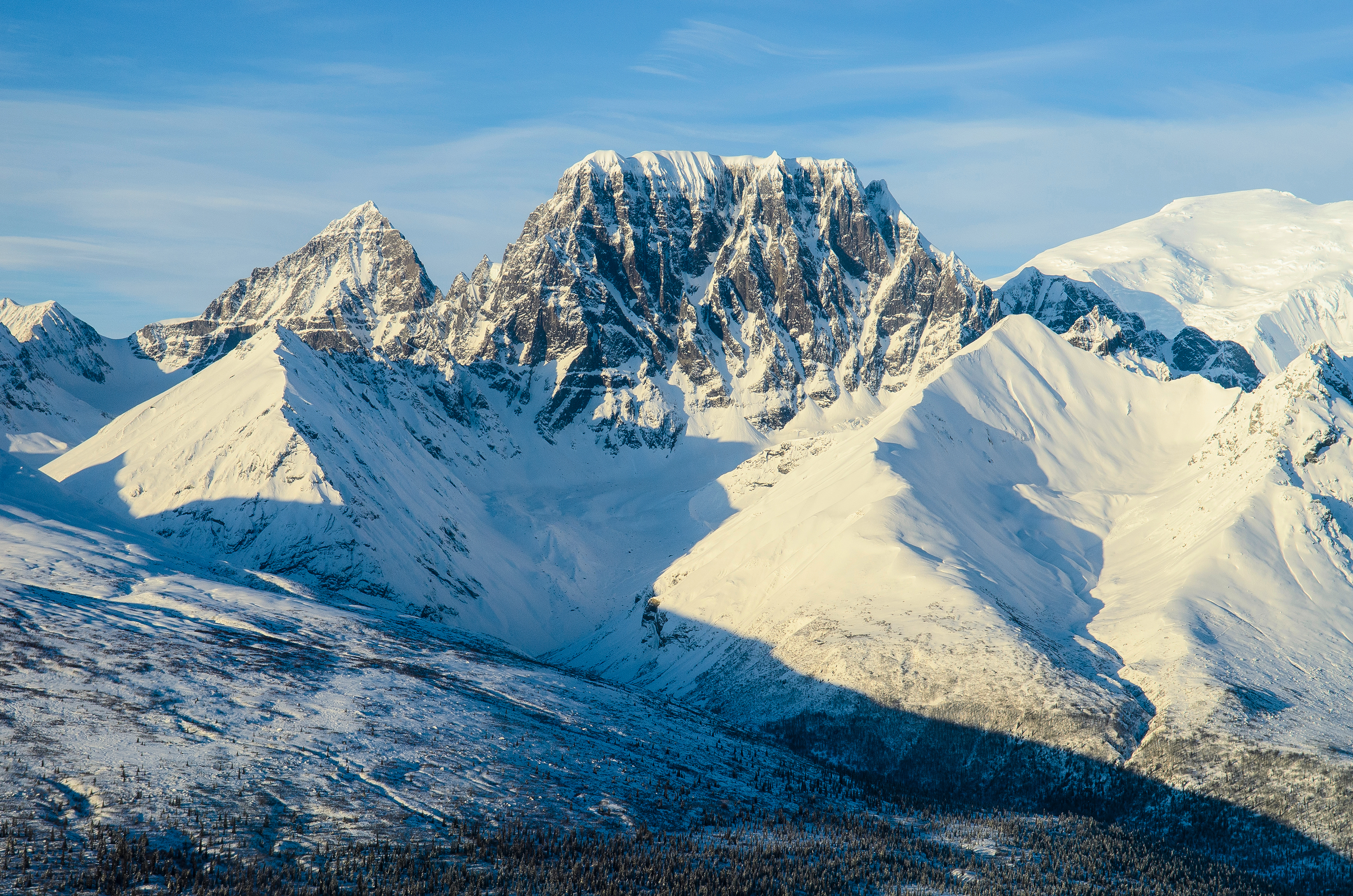
Castle Peak, south aspect

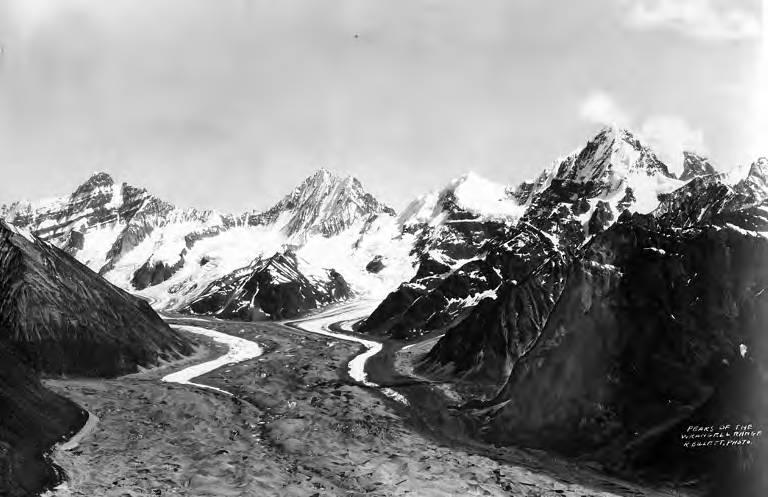
Castle Peak (right), with Kuskulana Glacier. 1924

== See also ==
- List of mountain peaks of Alaska
- Geography of Alaska
