= Nabesna Glacier =

Glacier in Alaska, United States

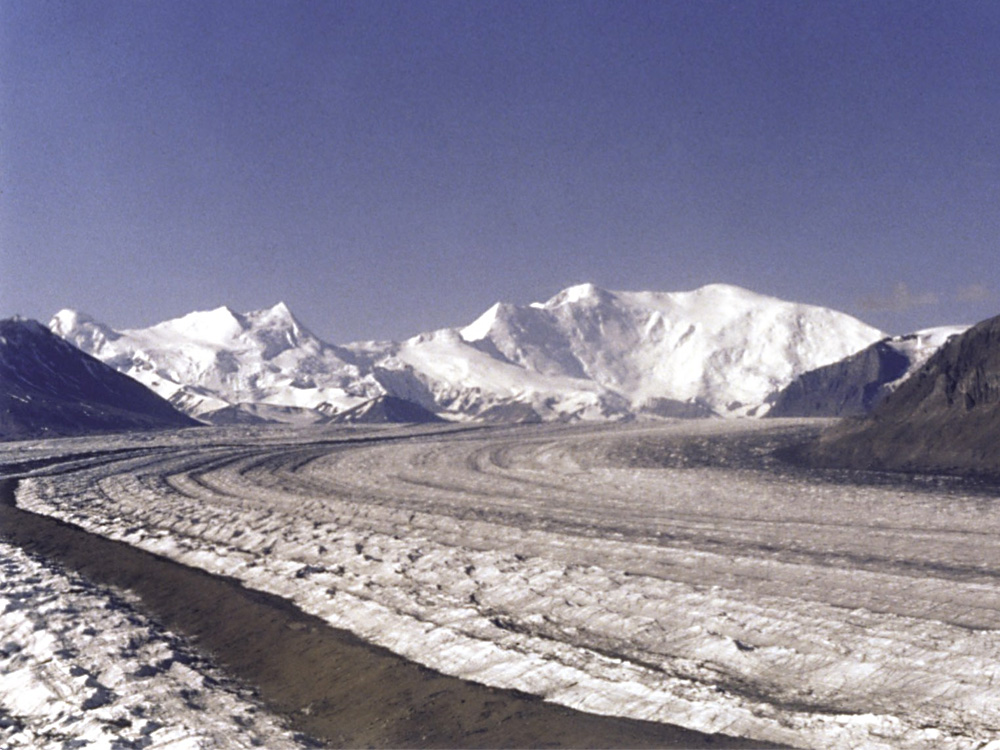
- The Nabesna Glacier, with Mount Blackburn at right; Atna Peaks is the twin summit left of center

- Location within Alaska
- Interactive map of Nabesna Glacier
- Type: Valley glacier
- Location: Copper River Census Area, Alaska, U.S.
- Coordinates: 61°56′00″N 143°05′26″W
- Length: 53 mi (85 km)
- Terminus: Nabesna River

Nabesna Glacier is a glacier in the U.S. state of Alaska. Fed by deep snowfall in the Wrangell Mountains, the 53 mile (85 km) long Nabesna is the longest valley glacier in North America and the world's longest interior valley glacier.

The glacier flows from an extensive icefield which covers the northern flanks of 14,163 feet (4,317 m) Mount Wrangell, a large shield volcano. It initially heads east past other volcanic peaks including Mount Blackburn and Atna Peaks and then turns north to its terminus near 3,000 ft (900 m) elevation, about 15 mi (24 km) south of the old mining settlement of Nabesna at the end of the Nabesna Road. The vast expanse and length of the Nabesna is fed by approximately 40 tributary glaciers. Melting ice at its terminus forms the Nabesna River, which flows northward through Tetlin National Wildlife Refuge and into the Tanana River.

== Geography ==
The glacier was named for the Nabesna River in 1902 by F. C. Schrader of the U.S. Geological Survey. It provides the normal route of access into the heart of the eastern Wrangell Mountains, for ski mountaineers, climbers, and scientists. Ski-equipped bush planes can typically land between 6,000 and 7,000 ft (1,800-2,100 m) on the central portion of the glacier when the ice and crevasses are covered by winter snow.

The glacier has been undergoing a slow, near-continuous retreat since at least the early 1900s. There is evidence to indicate this retreat has possibly been going on even longer, as glacial deposits much further down the valley show that it may have once been over 200 miles long.

== See also ==
- List of glaciers
