= Mount Chitina =

Mountain in Alaska

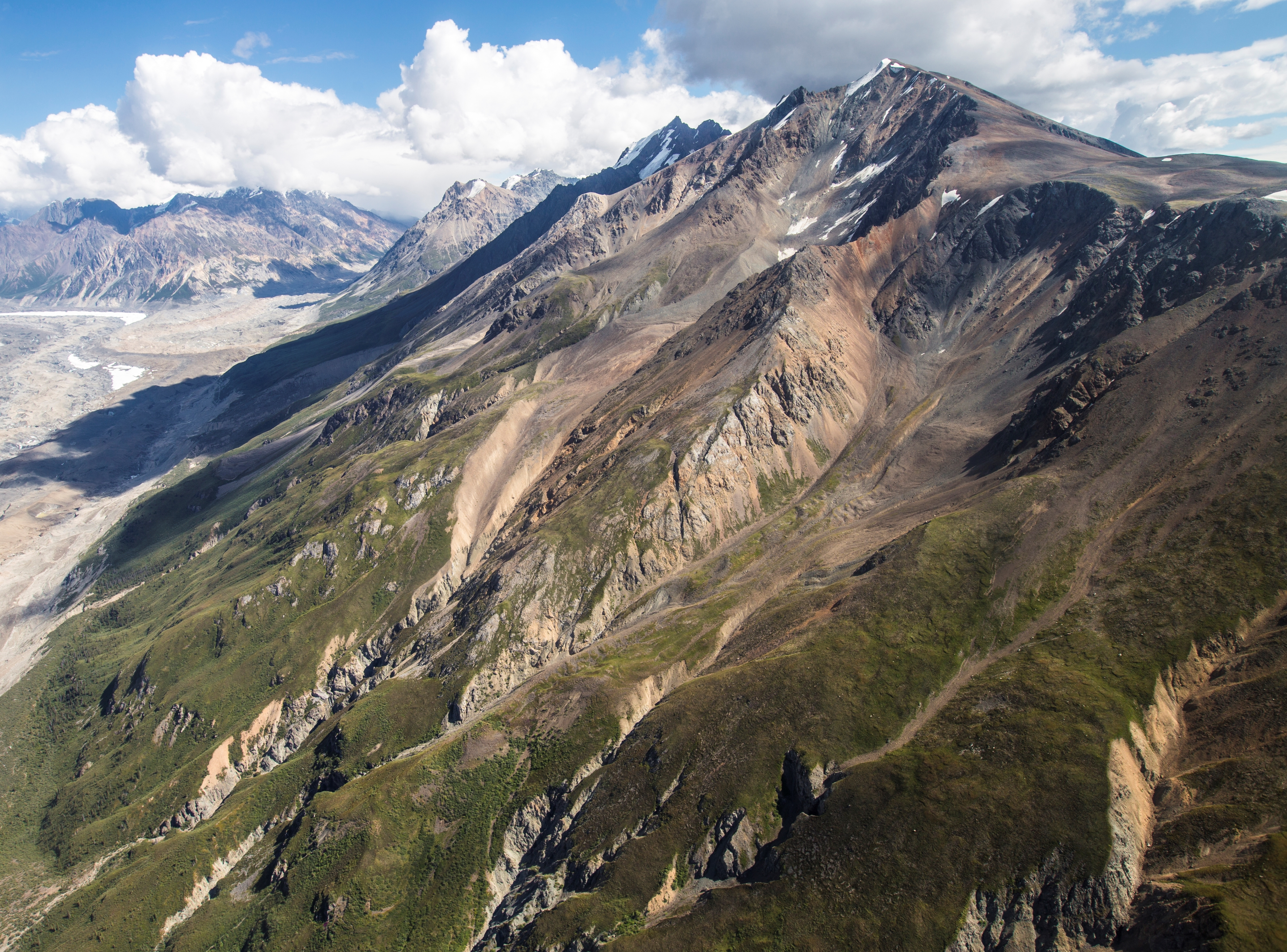
- Aerial view of west aspect

Highest point
- Elevation: 8,424 ft (2,568 m)
- Prominence: 474 ft (144 m)
- Isolation: 2.27 mi (3.65 km)>
- Coordinates: 60°57′56″N 141°15′44″W

Geography
- Location within Alaska
- Location: Wrangell–St. Elias National Park; Copper River Census Area; Alaska, United States
- Parent range: Saint Elias Mountains
- Topo map: USGS Bering Glacier D-1

Climbing
- First ascent: 1988
- Easiest route: West ridge

Mount Chitina is an 8,424-foot (2,568-meter) mountain summit located in the Saint Elias Mountains of Wrangell-St. Elias National Park and Preserve, in the U.S. state of Alaska. The remote peak is situated 113 mi (182 km) northwest of Yakutat, and 40 mi (64 km) northwest of Mount Logan. Mount Chitina rises 5,000+ ft (1,520+ m) above the confluence of the Chitina Glacier and the Logan Glacier. Precipitation runoff from the mountain drains into the Chitina River, which in turn is part of the Copper River drainage basin. The first ascent of the peak was made September 24, 1988, by Danny Kost and Donnie Hunton via the west ridge. The mountain's name is derived from the Chitina Glacier located at the base of the north slope, and was first published on a Canadian topographic map in 1958 no .

== Climate ==
Based on the Köppen climate classification, Mount Chitina is located in a subarctic climate zone with long, cold, snowy winters, and cool summers. Weather systems coming off the Gulf of Alaska are forced upwards by the Saint Elias Mountains (orographic lift), causing heavy precipitation in the form of rainfall and snowfall. Temperatures can drop below −20 °C with wind chill factors below −30 °C. The months May through June offer the most favorable weather for viewing and climbing.

== See also ==
- List of mountain peaks of Alaska
- Geography of Alaska
