= Gilahina River =

Coordinates: 61.3725°N 143.7800°W

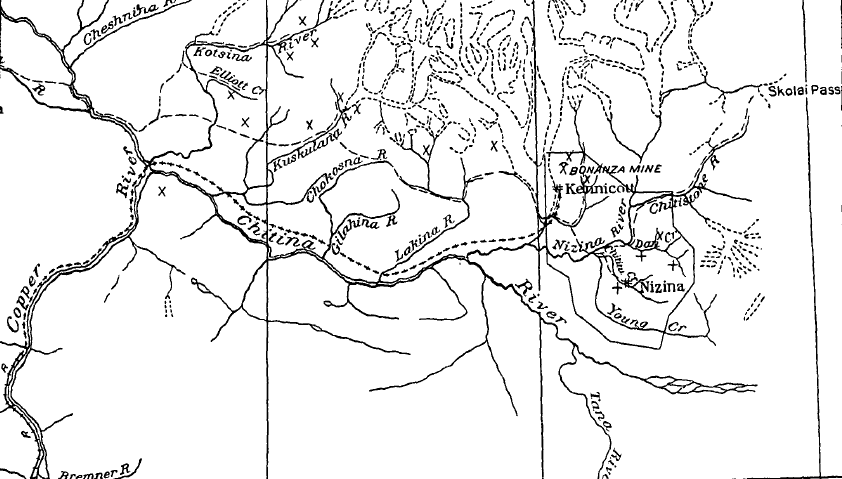
Map of the Gilahina River

Gilahina River is a waterway in the U.S. state of Alaska in the Wrangell–St. Elias National Park and Preserve.

The stream rises in mountains 6,000–7,000 feet (1,800–2,100 m) high between Lakina River on the east and Kuskulana River on the west. It is about 12 miles (19 km) long and joins the Chitina River 9 miles (14 km) below the Lakina. Three miles from the Chitina, it forks. The west branch, which is called the Chokosna, drains an area of 50 square miles (130 km^{2}) and is nearly as large as the main stream above the forks. The upper 6 miles (9.7 km) of the Gilahina in its course through the mountains has a grade of about 150 feet (46 m) per mile. As it approaches the Chitina Valley, the grade increases, and for the lower 6 miles (9.7 km), the average grade is about 200 feet (61 m) per mile. There are no glaciers in the basin, and at normal stages, the water is clear and free from sediment. The valley floor is made up of gravel, boulders, sand, and clay, and at high stages, the stream transports considerable material, causing marked changes in the channel.

== See also ==
- List of rivers of Alaska
