= Tetlin =

Tetlin may refer to:

- Tetlin, Alaska
- Tetlin Lake
- Tetlin River
- Tetlin National Wildlife Refuge
