= Lakina River =

Coordinates: 61.3242°N 143.5661°W

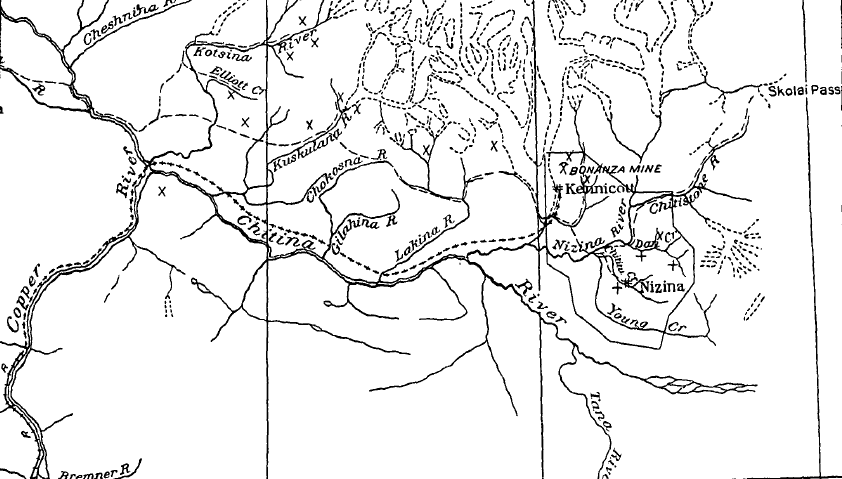
Map of the Lakina River

Lakina River is a tributary of the Chitina River in the U.S. state of Alaska. It is located in the Wrangell–St. Elias National Park and Preserve.

== Geography ==
The stream rises in an area of glacial drainage of minor importance lying between the much more extensive basins of the Kuskulana Glacier on the west and the Kennicott Glacier on the east. The Lakina is not as large or as turbulent a glacial stream as the Kuskulana or the Kennicott rivers. The trail historically traveled through this region reaches Lakina River about 6–7 miles (9.7–11.3 km) below the lower ends of the two glaciers from which the river emerges. This portion of the valley of the Lakina differs somewhat from the valleys of Kuskulana and Kennicott rivers where they flow from their glacial sources in that it has a more basin-like expansion in its lower half. This basin-like expanse, which is about 2 miles (3.2 km) wide along the trail and gradually narrows into a mountain gorge valley 0.5 miles (0.80 km) wide toward the head of the river as the glaciers are approached, is floored with deposits of gravel, sand, and mud. In an ascent of Lakina River from the main trail, the first bed rock to present itself along the margins of the flat gravel floor of the valley is the Nikolai greenstone. This rock appears on both sides of the valley where the valley begins to become more restricted, about 3 miles (4.8 km) below the glaciers, and rises in steep mountain slopes on both sides. Above the greenstone, the Chitistone limestone presents its characteristic cliff-like faces, and above the Chitistone limestone, a series of shales and thin-bedded limestones on the east side of the valley forms bare slopes that are also present, though not so evident, on the heights west of the river.

Lakina River, the first important tributary of Chitina River below the Nizina, is about 28 miles (45 km) long, and its average grade is 70 feet (21 m) per mile. It rises in small glaciers between Kennicott Glacier on the east, Kuskulana Glacier on the north, and Gilahina River on the west. Castle Peak (elevation 10,514 feet (3,205 m)) is the highest point in the basin. The topography of the headwaters is rugged, but the basin does not extend as far north as the axis of the Wrangell Range. The river carries less glacial debris than the Nizina or the Kuskulana. The summer flow is probably derived to a considerable extent from melting snow in the higher peaks and depends on glacial flow to a less extent than any of the northern tributaries of the Chitina except the Gilahina.

== See also ==
- List of rivers of Alaska
