= Nabesna River =

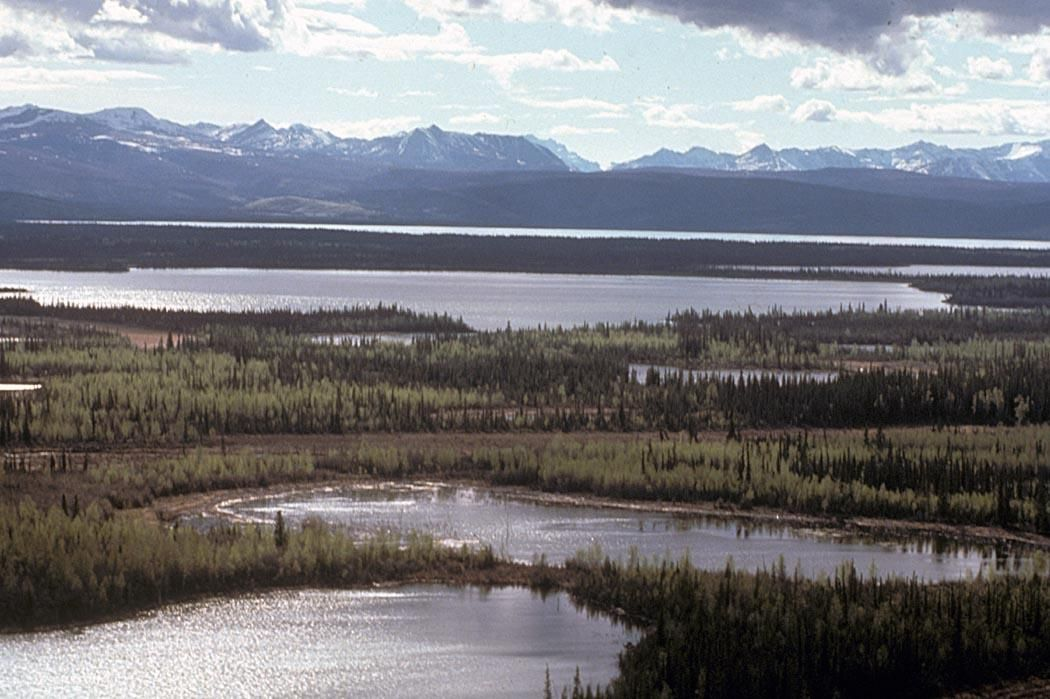

- Location of the mouth of the Nabesna River in Alaska
- Native name: Naambia Niign (Upper Tanana)

Location
- Country: United States
- State: Alaska
- Census Areas: Copper River, Southeast Fairbanks

Physical characteristics
- Source: Nabesna Glacier
  - location: Wrangell Mountains, Alaska Range, Valdez–Cordova Census Area, Wrangell–St. Elias National Park and Preserve
  - coordinates: 62°10′10″N 142°51′00″W
  - elevation: 3,061 ft (933 m)
- Mouth: Tanana River
  - location: 41 miles (66 km) southeast of Tok, Southeast Fairbanks Census Area, Tetlin National Wildlife Refuge
  - coordinates: 63°02′57″N 141°51′57″W
  - elevation: 1,690 ft (520 m)
- Length: 73 mi (117 km)

The Nabesna River (Upper Tanana: Naambia Niign) is a 73-mile (117 km) tributary of the Tanana River in the U.S. state of Alaska. Beginning at Nabesna Glacier in the Alaska Range, it flows north-northeast from Wrangell–St. Elias National Park and Preserve to join the Chisana River near Northway Junction. The combined rivers form the Tanana.

== Boating ==
The Nabesna River, swift-flowing in its upper reaches, passes through a deep valley that opens into broad plain. Gradually slowing, the river enters the Tetlin National Wildlife Refuge, a region of marshes, hills, lakes, and forests of spruce and birch.

The river, suited to running by rafts, hard-shelled kayaks, or decked canoes, is rated Class I (easy) to Class II (medium) on the International Scale of River Difficulty. The current is swift on the stream's upper 40 miles (64 km) and slow from there to the mouth. Dangers include cold, swift, silty water, and braided channels. Glacier melt may cause flow rates to rise significantly between morning and afternoon on warm days.

== Fishing ==
The Nabesna is a popular fishing site in Alaska. Species such as the Rainbow Trout, King Salmon, Red Salmon and Coho Salmon.

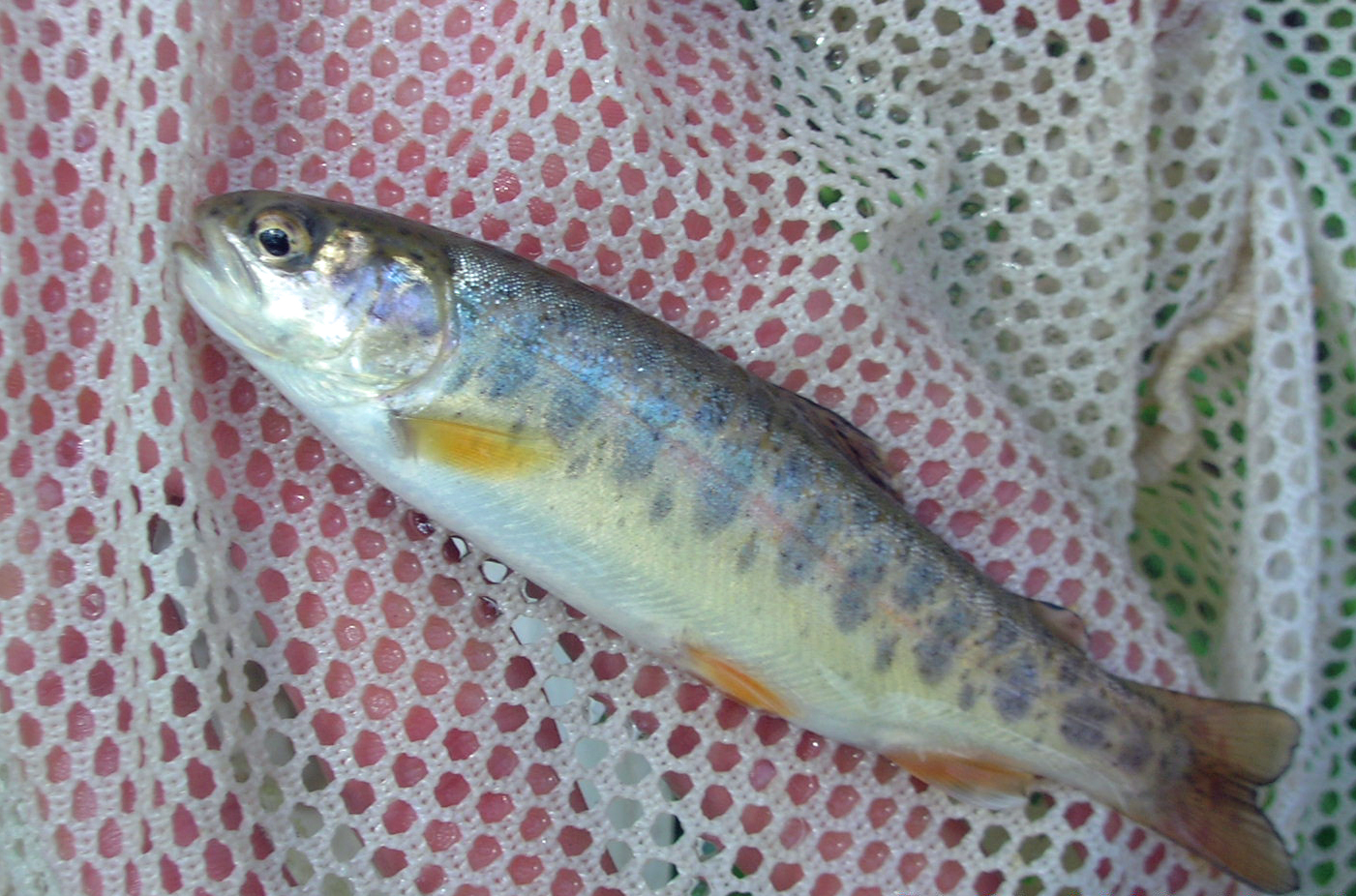
Rainbow Trout

== See also ==
- List of rivers of Alaska
