= Kiagna River =

River in Alaska, United States of America

Coordinates: 61.1083°N 142.5333°W

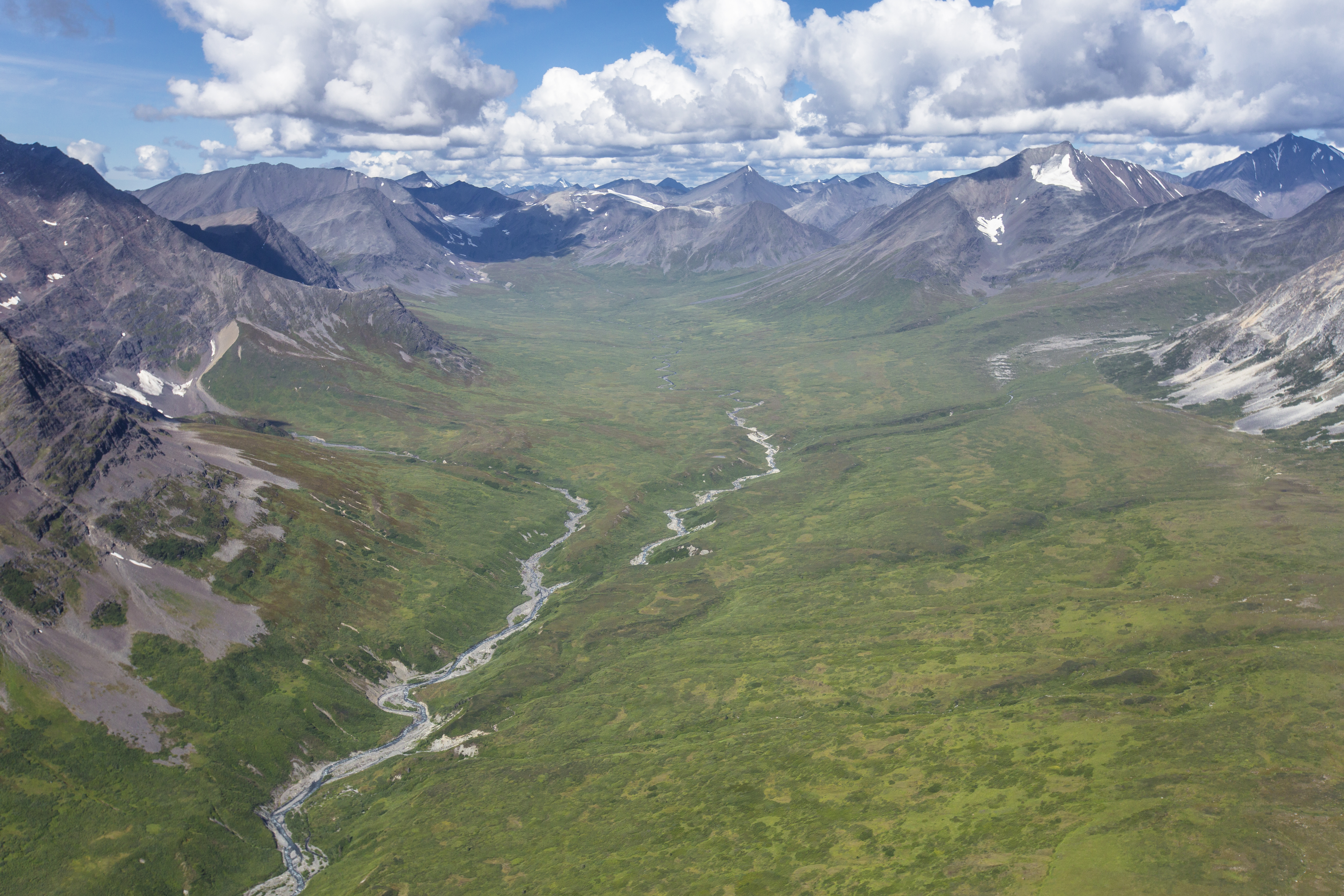
East Fork of the Kiagna River

Kiagna River is a waterway in the U.S. state of Alaska, which flows through the Wrangell–St. Elias National Park and Preserve.

== Geography ==
Kiagna River is a southern tributary of Chitina River, which it joins 30 miles (48 km) below the Chitina Glacier, heads in the high mountains between Chitina River and Granite Creek. It is formed by the union of three principal branches, which receive most of their water from melting snow and ice, and it occupies a typical glacial valley—straight, steep walled, and heavily timbered. Its east and west branches are inclosed by high mountains, but its smaller middle branch flows from a glacier, part of whose drainage is diverted by a tributary to Granite Creek. It thus provides a route from the Chitina Valley to Granite Creek, a westward-flowing stream about 20 miles (32 km) south of the Chitina, which occupies an interior basin in the ice fields of the Chugach Range.

== History ==
Kiagna River was first explored by prospectors who ascended the stream from Chitina River, about 1904, after gold had been discovered on Dan and Chititu creeks. They staked ground but seem to have done little mining. In 1906, or possibly 1905, James Barkley and J. B. Miller crossed the ice field between Yakataga beach and Granite Creek and made their way to the head of the Kiagna. They saw evidence that the Native Americans knew this route to the coast and they found the stakes of the former prospectors on the Kiagna. After a short stay, they returned to Yakataga by the route over which they had come. In 1907, Barkley, accompanied by William Jefferies, made the trip again. This time, they went around the east end of Granite Creek, and, instead of going back to Yakataga, they descended the Chitina and Copper rivers to the coast. Subsequently, others visited the district from time to time. In the fall and winter of 1914–15, there was a miniature stampede to the district. The men who took part in it found little to encourage them and abandoned the field.

== See also ==
- List of rivers of Alaska
