= Logan Glacier (Alaska) =

Glacier in Yukon, Canada and Alaska, United States

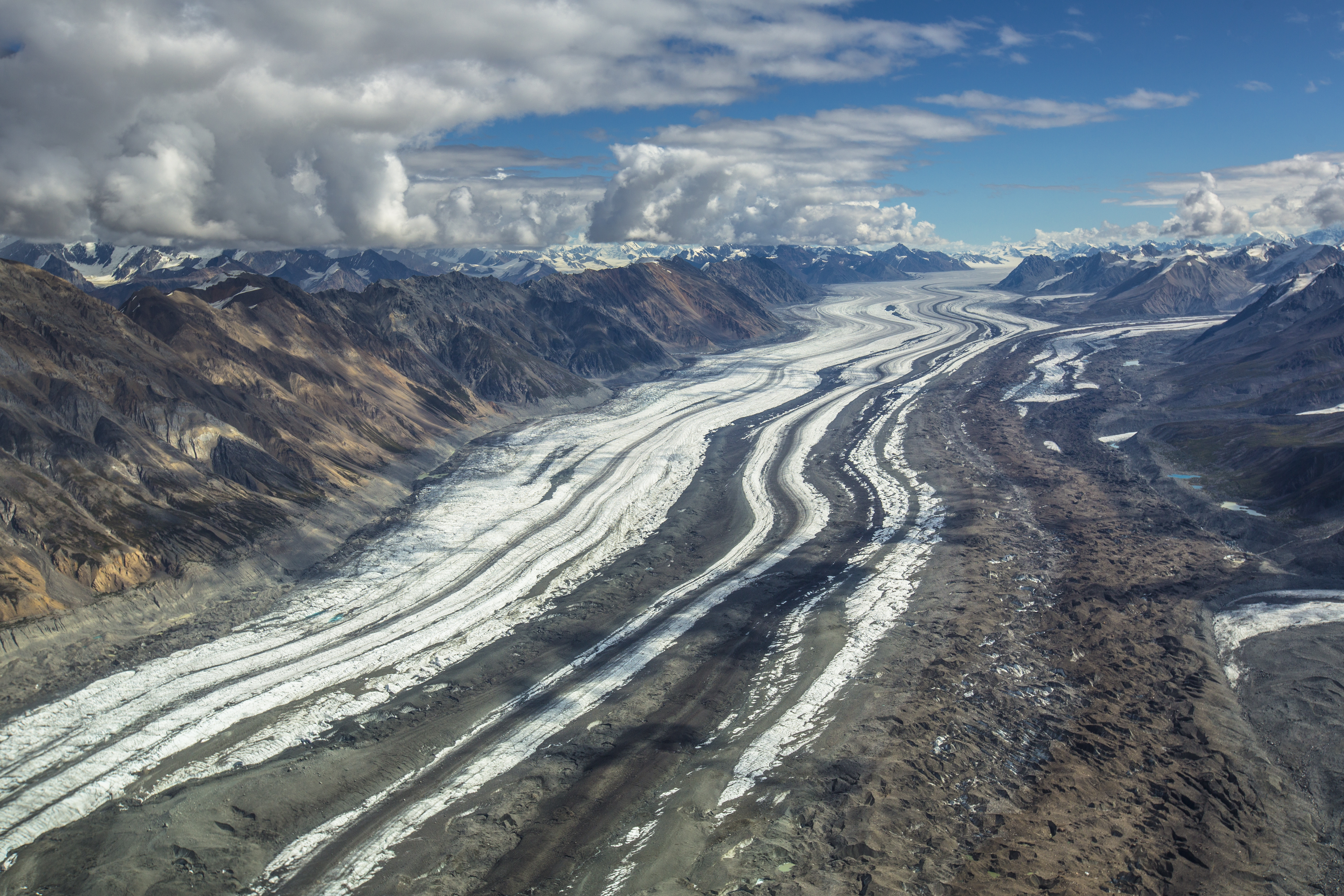
- The Logan Glacier from the air

- Location within Alaska
- Interactive map of Logan Glacier
- Type: Mountain glacier
- Location: Alaska, U.S.
- Coordinates: 60°53′22″N 141°11′43″W
- Status: Retreating

Logan Glacier is a glacier in the U.S. state of Alaska and territory of Yukon, Canada. It heads down the northern side of the Mount Logan massif in the Yukon, flowing northwest across the Canada-United States boundary to form the headwaters of the Chitina River. It was named for its origin on the slopes of, and proximity to, Mount Logan.

== See also ==
- List of glaciers
- Wrangell–St. Elias National Park and Preserve
- Kluane National Park and Reserve
