= Operation Alaska =

Proposed plan to rescue Finnish refugees

Operation Alaska (Finnish: Operaatio Alaska), Finalaska or New Finland (Uusi Suomi) was a plan proposed in 1940 by some US officials at the Department of the Interior to take Finnish refugees into Alaska if the Soviet Union would have conquered Finland. There were plans to take Finns into Alaska, both during the Winter War and the Continuation War. New Finland would have been established in Central Alaska around the Tanana River.

The plan was opposed by Alaskans in the Congress, mainly because of the issue of having a large group of people speaking a language that was not understood in the region.

== Background ==
In the United States during the Winter War, a genocide of the Finns was feared, so plans were drawn up by the Department of the Interior to evacuate them to Alaska. Alaska was chosen because it was thought to be suitable for Finnish people and because it had a very low population of only 72,000. Finland at that time had a population of 3.7 million. During the Continuation War (Jatkosota) there was also a plan to take Finnish refugees, however on a larger scale, because America was ready to evacuate the whole Finnish population and a populated Alaska would have been better secured in the upcoming Cold War against Soviet offensives.

== See also ==
- The Slattery Report, a similar plan to move Jews fleeing Nazi-occupied Europe to Alaska.
