= Atna Peaks =

Volcano in Alaska, United States

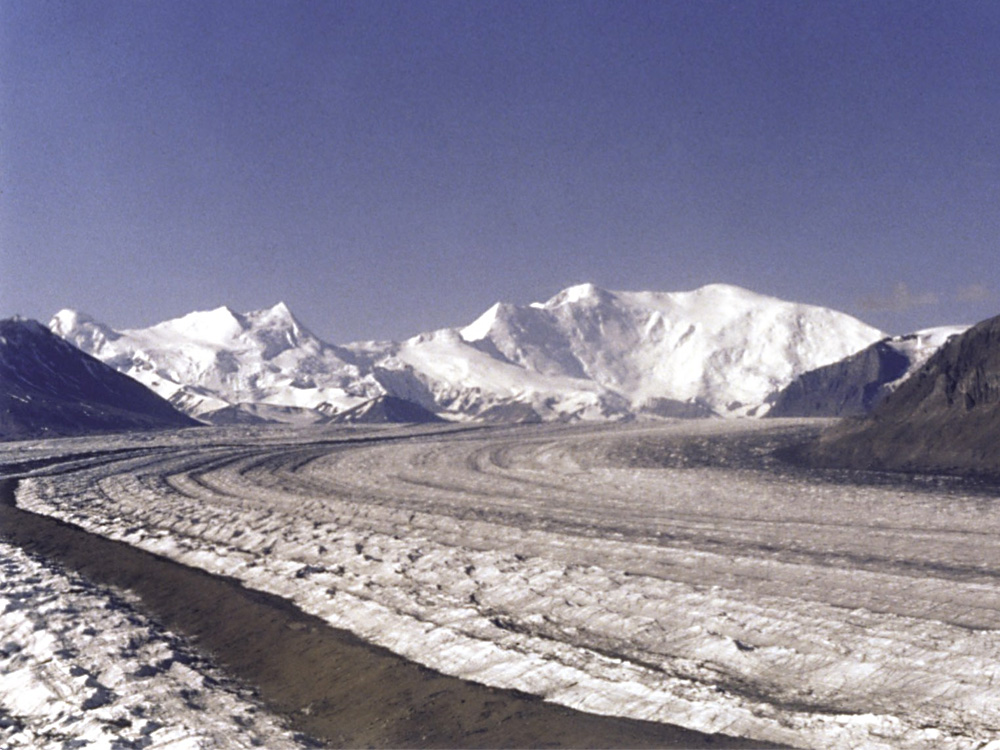
- The Nabesna Glacier, with Mount Blackburn at right; Atna Peaks is the twin summit left of center and Parka Peak is the icy summit at left

Highest point
- Elevation: 13,860 ft (4,220 m)
- Prominence: 2,160 ft (660 m)
- Isolation: 3.7 mi (6.0 km)
- Listing: North America highest peaks 68th; US highest major peaks 51st; Alaska highest major peaks 15th
- Coordinates: 61°44′58″N 143°14′23″W

Geography
- Location within Alaska
- Location: Valdez-Cordova Census Area, Alaska, U.S.
- Parent range: Wrangell Mountains
- Topo map: USGS McCarthy C-6

Geology
- Mountain type: Eroded stratovolcano or shield volcano
- Last eruption: Unknown

Climbing
- First ascent: Alex Bittenbinder, Don Stockard, and Vin Hoeman, 1965
- Easiest route: glacier climb

Atna Peaks is an eroded stratovolcano or shield volcano in the Wrangell Mountains of eastern Alaska. It is located in Wrangell–Saint Elias National Park about 6 miles (9.7 km) east of Mount Blackburn, the second-highest volcano in the United States, and just south of the massive Nabesna Glacier. The mountain is almost entirely covered in glaciers, so no geological studies have been done, but published references state and the geological map shows that the mountain is an old eroded volcanic edifice.

The mountain's main summit is 13,860 feet (4,225 m), making it the second-highest thirteener (a peak between 13,000 and 13,999 feet in elevation) in Alaska. The second summit is located about 0.6 miles (0.97 km) to the east, reaching over 13,600 feet (4,100 m), and another named summit, 13,280 ft (4,048 m) Parka Peak, is about 1.6 miles (2.6 km) further east across a glacier-covered saddle. The steep rocky south faces of these three peaks form part of the cirque of the Kennicott Glacier, which flows southeast over 20 mi (32 km) to just above the town of McCarthy.

Atna Peaks was named in 1965 by the first ascent party from the Mountaineering Club of Alaska, because the "peaks are at the edge of the Copper River drainage and the old Indian name for that river was Atna."

== Gallery ==
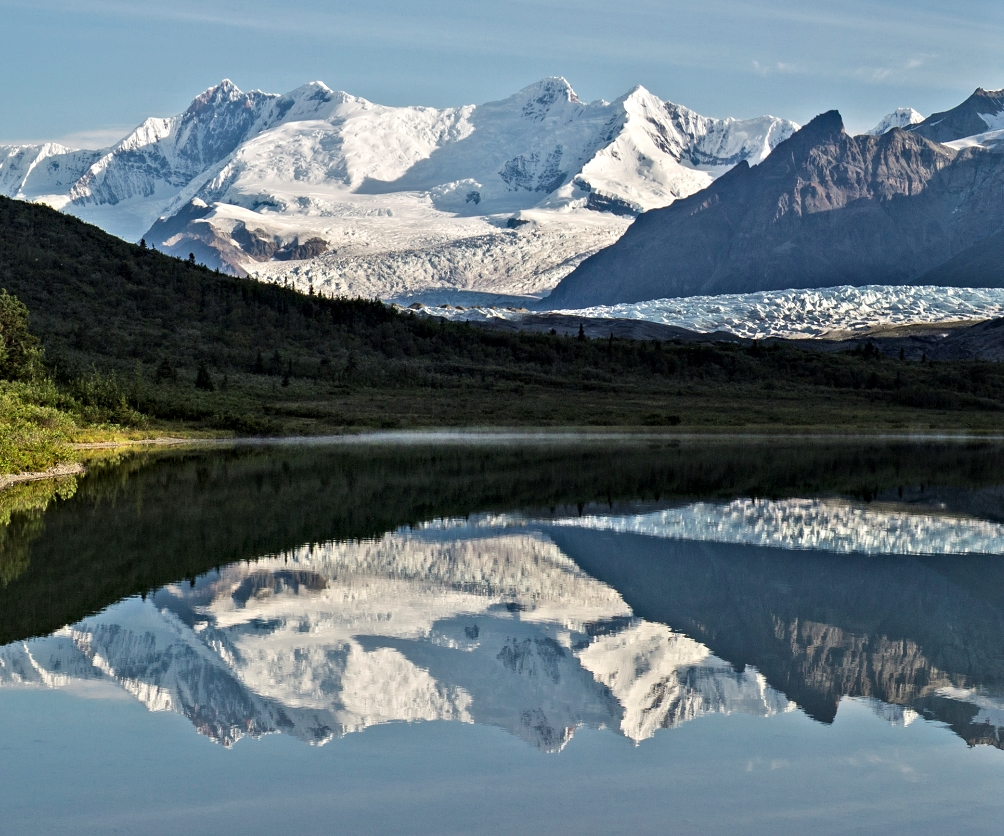
Looking north at Parka Peak centered with Atna Peaks to left reflected in a lake near Donoho Peak

== See also ==
- List of mountain peaks of North America
  - List of mountain peaks of the United States
    - List of mountain peaks of Alaska
- List of volcanoes in the United States
