= Harry A. Slattery =

American environmentalist and lawyer

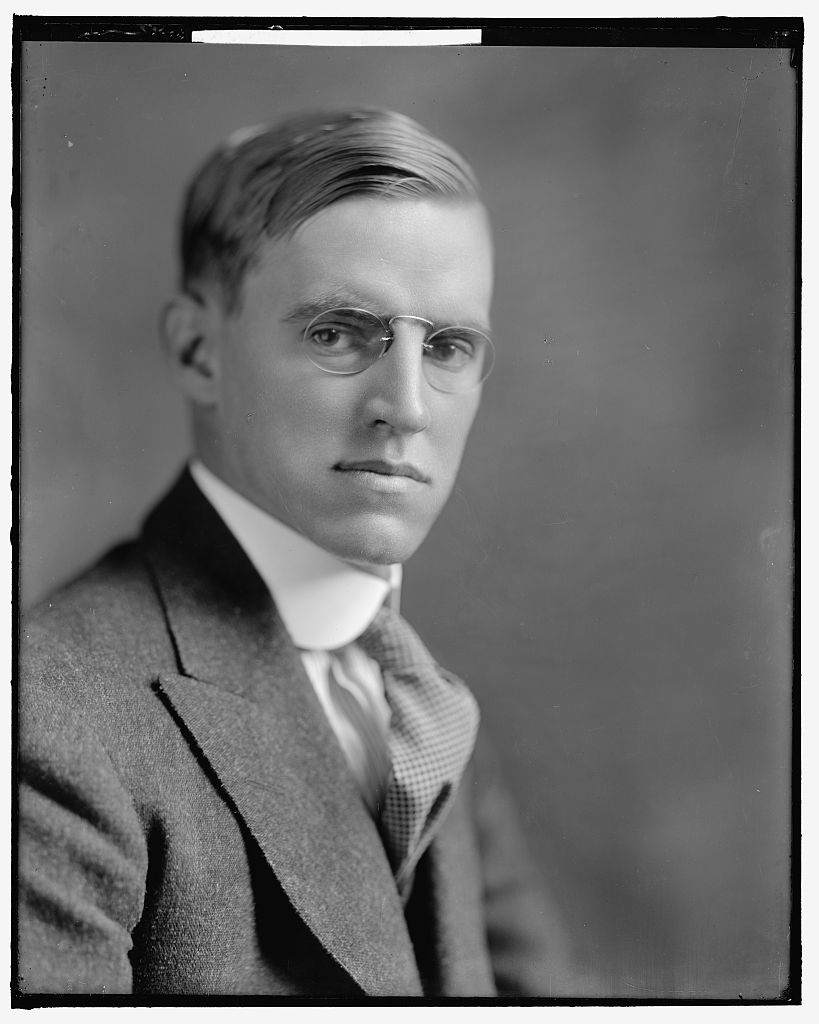
Harry A. Slattery (photo by Harris & Ewing)

Harry A. Slattery (June 13, 1887 – September 1, 1949), was an American lawyer and politician. He was United States Under Secretary of the Interior from 1938 to 1939 and gave his name to the Slattery Report, which proposed to develop Alaska through immigration. The proposal, which included the settlement of Jewish refugees from Germany and Austria, largely in response to Nazi antisemitism, was never implemented.

== Early life ==
He was born in Greenville, South Carolina. Slattery attended Mount Saint Mary's College in Maryland, Georgetown University and George Washington University.

== Career ==
In 1909–1912, he was secretary to Gifford Pinchot, Chief Forester in Theodore Roosevelt's administration.

In 1912–1917, he was Executive Secretary of the National Conservation Association, appointed by its founder, Pinchot.

In 1917–1918, he was Special Assistant to United States Secretary of the Interior Franklin K. Lane.

In 1919–1923, he was Counsel to the National Conservation Association. As part of government efforts to indict big business for the exploitation of the country's natural resources, he was involved in Senate investigations of the Mulhall exposure during Wilson's administration and the Teapot Dome Scandal of 1921.

In 1923–1933, he practiced law in Washington, D.C.

In 1925–1929, he was Executive and counsel for the National Boulder Dam Association. In 1929–1932, he Counsel for the National Conservation Commission. In 1931–1933, he was Washington, D.C. representative for the New York Power Authority. In 1933–1938, he was Personal Assistant to Harold Ickes, Secretary of the Interior, and Assistant to administrator of Federal Emergency Administration of Public Works.

In 1938–1939, Slattery was Under Secretary of the Interior, until his appointment by Roosevelt on 26 September 1939 to head up the Rural Electrification Administration (REA). He resigned after a conflict with Secretary of Agriculture Claude R. Wickard in 1944.

The 1944 controversy between the REA and the Department of Agriculture over the administration of REA led to a Senate investigation. Slattery was involved in the passage of a federal coal and oil leasing measure, federal water power legislation, Alaska coal and home rule acts, and rural electrification legislation.

In 1940–1942, he was also Consultant to the power subcommittee of the advisory commission of the Council of National Defense.

In 1944, Slattery received LL.D. from the University of South Carolina.

Slattery was a member of the National Power Policy Committee, the Energy Resources and Land Committees of the National Resources Planning Board, the Interbureau Coordinating Committee, the Federal States Relations Committee, the Society of American Foresters, the National Press Club, the Missouri Athletic Club, and Delta Theta Phi fraternity.

== Personal life ==
Slattery died on September 1, 1949.

His papers are held in the Duke University Libraries.
