= Tebay River =

River in Alaska, US

Coordinates: 61.3936°N 143.9894°W

Tebay River (Alaska Native languages name meaning "a variety of sheep") is a waterway in the U.S. state of Alaska. It is located 36 miles (58 km) southwest of McCarthy, in the Wrangell–St. Elias National Park and Preserve.

== Geography ==
Rising in the Chugach Mountains, Tebay is one of the main affluents of the Chitina River. It joins the Chitina about 20 miles (32 km) above the Copper, drains the Hanagita Valley and receives through its more southerly branches the discharge from a few minor glaciers. There are several lakes in the headwaters.

Tebay River drains the Tebay Lakes, but receives most of its water from Hanagita Creek, a much smaller part coming from Bridge Creek, the outlet to Summit Lake. Between the lakes and Bridge Creek, the current is slow and the channel deep and meandering, but below Hanagita Creek the river descends 1,000 feet (300 m) in the stretch of 6 miles (9.7 km) to Chitina River. Hanagita Creek is the largest stream in the Hanagita Valley; it drains a number of small lakes and receives water from numerous tributaries. Sangaina Creek is the largest of these tributaries, with a swift current and a great number of boulders in its channel.

== See also ==
- List of rivers of Alaska
