= Slattery Report =

Proposal to develop Alaska through Jewish immigration

The Slattery Report, officially titled The Problem of Alaskan Development, was produced by the United States Department of the Interior under President Franklin D. Roosevelt's secretary Harold L. Ickes in 1939–40. It was named after Undersecretary of the Interior Harry A. Slattery. The report, which dealt with Alaskan development through immigration, included a proposal to move European refugees, especially Jews from Nazi Germany and Austria, to four locations in Alaska, including Baranof Island and the Matanuska-Susitna Valley. Skagway, Petersburg and Seward were the only towns to endorse the proposal.

== The report ==
In November 1938, two weeks after Kristallnacht, Ickes proposed the use of Alaska as a "haven for Jewish refugees from Germany and other areas in Europe where the Jews are subjected to oppressive restrictions". Resettlement in Alaska would allow the refugees to bypass normal immigration quotas, because Alaska was a territory and not a state. That summer Ickes had toured the Territory of Alaska and met with local officials to discuss improving the local economy and bolstering security in a territory viewed as vulnerable to Japanese attack. Ickes thought European Jews might be the solution.

In his proposal, Ickes pointed out that 200 families from Michigan, Minnesota and Wisconsin had settled in Alaska's Matanuska-Susitna Valley. The plan was introduced as a bill by Senator William King (Utah) and Representative Franck R. Havenner (California), both Democrats. The Alaska proposal won the support of theologian Paul Tillich, the Federal Council of Churches, and the American Friends Service Committee.

== Response ==
The plan failed to win support from leaders of the American Jewish community, with the exception of the Labor Zionists of America. Rabbi Stephen Wise, president of the American Jewish Congress, stated that adoption of the Alaska proposal would deliver "a wrong and hurtful impression ... that Jews are taking over some part of the country for settlement".

Some non-Jewish Americans also moved against the proposal, relying on a backlash of anti-Jewish rhetoric to suggest that the proposal would allow Jews to enter America as "Trojan horses" and carry Marxist ideology with them.

The plan was dealt a severe blow when President Franklin D. Roosevelt told Ickes that he insisted on limiting the number of refugees to 10,000 a year for five years, and with a further restriction that Jews not make up more than 10% of the refugees. Roosevelt never mentioned the Alaska proposal in public, and without his support the plan died.

== See also ==
- Birobidzhan, a Soviet-era Siberian city founded in 1931, intended for Jewish settlement within the Soviet Union.
- Évian Conference
- International response to the Holocaust
- Territorialism, a Jewish political movement calling for creation of a sufficiently large and compact Jewish territory (or territories), not necessarily in the Land of Israel and not necessarily fully autonomous.
- Operation Alaska, a similar plan to move Finns fleeing a potential Soviet invasion to Alaska.
- Proposals for a Jewish state
- The Yiddish Policemen's Union (2007) by Michael Chabon, an alternate history novel set in a world where the Slattery Report was implemented.
