= Tanana River =

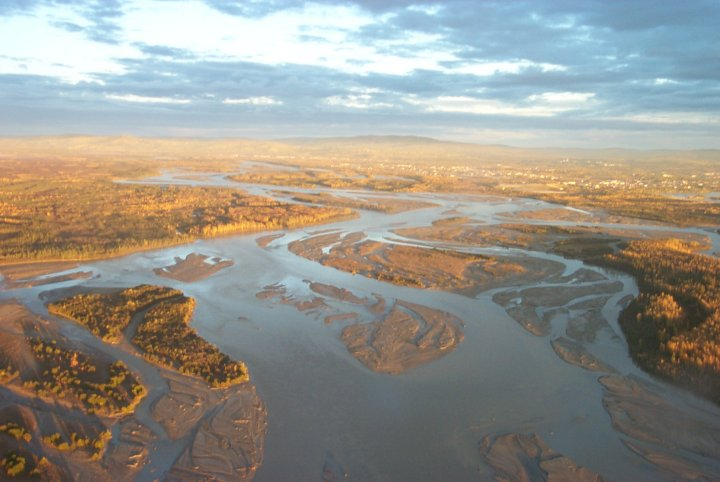
- Tanana River near Fairbanks, Alaska

- Course of the Tanana River, formed by the shorter Nabesna River (left) and Chisana River (right), then flowing northwest to meet the Yukon River
- Etymology: from the Koyukon (Athabaskan) tene no, tenene, meaning "trail river".
- Native name: Tth’iitu’ Niign (Upper Tanana); Tth'eetoo' (Lower Tanana)

Location
- Country: United States
- State: Alaska
- District: Southeast Fairbanks Census Area, Fairbanks North Star Borough, Yukon-Koyukuk Census Area

Physical characteristics
- Source: confluence of the Nabesna and Chisana rivers
  - location: Northway Junction, Tetlin National Wildlife Refuge
  - coordinates: 63°02′57″N 141°51′52″W
  - elevation: 1,672 ft (510 m)
- Mouth: Yukon River
  - location: near Tanana
  - coordinates: 65°09′38″N 151°57′37″W
  - elevation: 200 ft (61 m)
- Length: 584 mi (940 km)
- Basin size: 44,000 sq mi (110,000 km^{2})
- Discharge
  - location: mouth
  - average: 41,800 cu ft/s (1,180 m^{3}/s)

The Tanana River /ˈtænənɑː/ (Lower Tanana: Tth'eetoo', Upper Tanana: Tth’iitu’ Niign) is a 584-mile (940 km) tributary of the Yukon River in the U.S. state of Alaska. (Note: The main-stem length is calculated by subtracting the length of the Nabesna River from the length of 659 mi (1,061 km) listed by J.C. Kammerer in "Largest Rivers in the United States". The Nabesna River is roughly 75 mi (121 km) long, calculated by adding the 60 mi (97 km) from the Nabesna mouth to Camp Creek to the distance of 15 mi (24 km) from Camp Creek to Nabesna Glacier, Kammerer's most remote source for the Tanana.) According to linguist and anthropologist William Bright, the name is from the Koyukon (Athabaskan) tene no, tenene, literally "trail river." Early explorer and naturalist to Alaska William Dall translated the name as "River of Mountains."

The river's headwaters are located at the confluence of the Chisana and Nabesna rivers just north of Northway in eastern Alaska. The Tanana flows in a northwest direction from near the border with the Yukon Territory, and laterally along the northern slope of the Alaska Range, roughly paralleled by the Alaska Highway. In central Alaska, it emerges into a lowland marsh region known as the Tanana Valley and passes south of the city of Fairbanks.

In the marsh regions it is joined by several large tributaries, including the Nenana (near the city of Nenana) and the Kantishna. It passes the village of Manley Hot Springs and empties into the Yukon near the town of Tanana.

Ice on the river accumulates each winter to an average maximum thickness of 43 inches (110 cm) at Nenana. The Nenana Ice Classic, begun in 1917, is an annual guessing game about the date of the ice break-up. In October or November, after the freeze has begun, a tripod is planted in ice in the middle of the river. The tripod is connected to an on-shore clock that stops when the tripod begins to move during the spring thaw. Over the years, the break-up date has varied from April 20 to May 20. Betting on the exact time of the break-up takes the form of a lottery, called the Nenana Ice Classic.

== History ==
Human habitation of the Yukon basin, including the Tanana watershed, began more than 12,000 years ago. Several sites in the watershed have produced evidence of occupation by Paleo-Arctic people. Later residents include people of the Tanana tribe, which has had a presence in the region for 1,200 years.

In the summer of 1885, Lieutenant Henry Tureman Allen of the U.S. Army undertook the first recorded exploration of the Tanana River. In 1883, Lieutenant Frederick Schwatka and his party had entered the Yukon watershed by way of Canada and floated to the mouth of the Yukon. Allen's goal was to find an all-Alaska route to the Yukon River. He and his men ascended the Copper River, crossed into Tanana River drainage, and descended the Tanana to the Yukon and down it to the mouth. During the five-month trip, the Allen party mapped the courses of the Copper, Tanana, and Koyukuk rivers.

During World War II, it was proposed to resettle Finnish refugees in areas around the Tanana River (Operation Alaska).

In the early 21st century, the basin is largely wilderness unchanged by human activity. Fairbanks, a metropolitan area with about 100,000 residents in 2019, is a center of placer gold mining, which has continued in the basin since the mid-19th century. Limited farming also occurs in the valley near Fairbanks.

On April 23, 2024, a Douglas C-54D operated by Alaska Air Fuel crashed along the banks of the Tanana River, killing both pilots, the only two occupants on board. Most fuel on board the aircraft was burned up in the post-crash fire and no cleanup operation were conducted.

== Nenana Ice Classic ==
Since the early 1900s, Alaskans have been gambling on when the river would melt. Each year, thousands pay $3.00 to guess the exact date and minute the Tanana River ice will go out in Nenana. The Nenana Ice Classic is a fundraiser for local charities and has awarded some large prizes. In 2010, after the ice went out on April 29, three lottery winners split a jackpot of $279,030. In 2012, the record prize was $350,000.

== Major tributaries (in descending order of elevation) ==
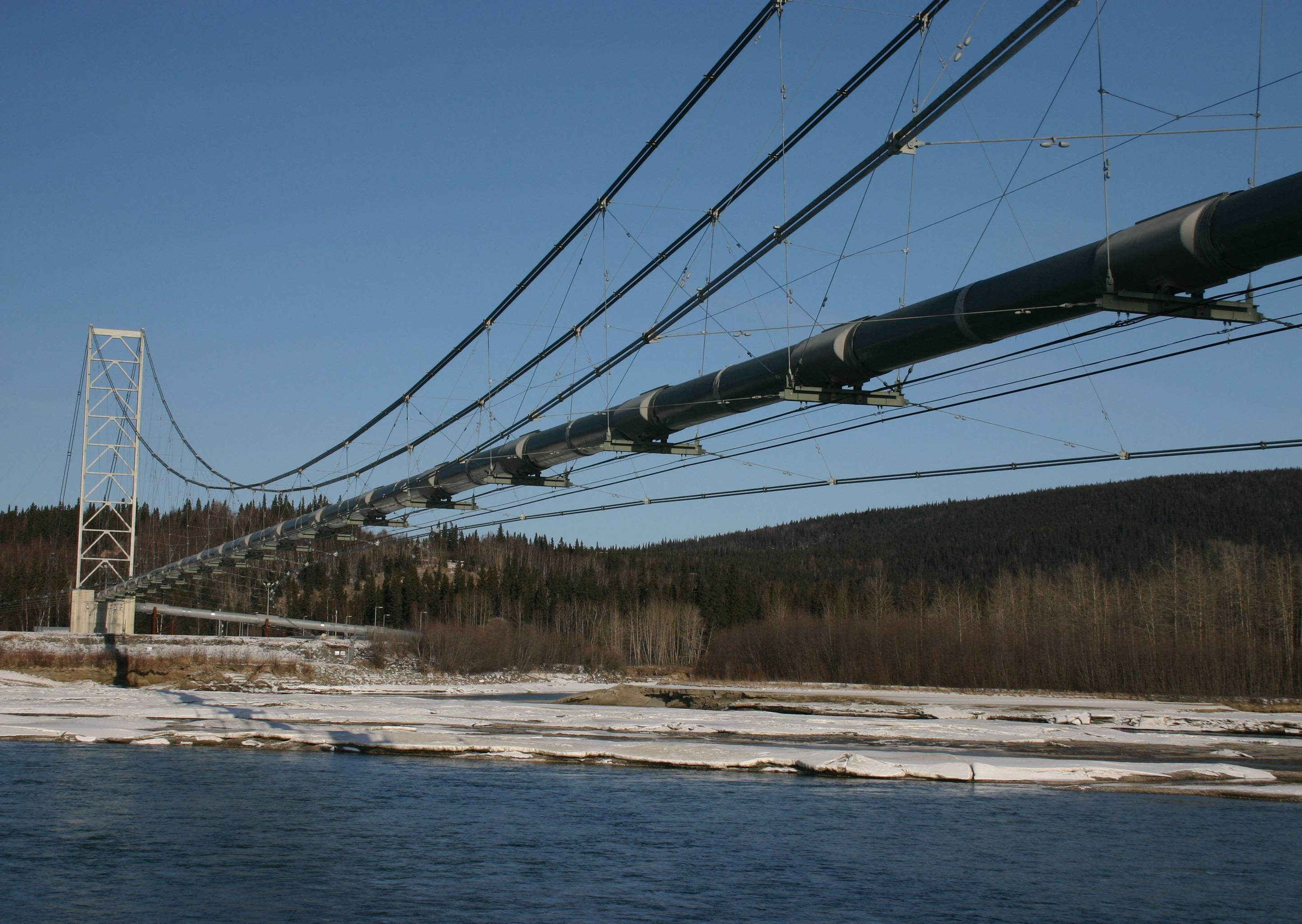
The Trans-Alaska Pipeline crosses beneath several rivers, but has a pipeline bridge where it crosses the Tanana just north of Delta Junction.

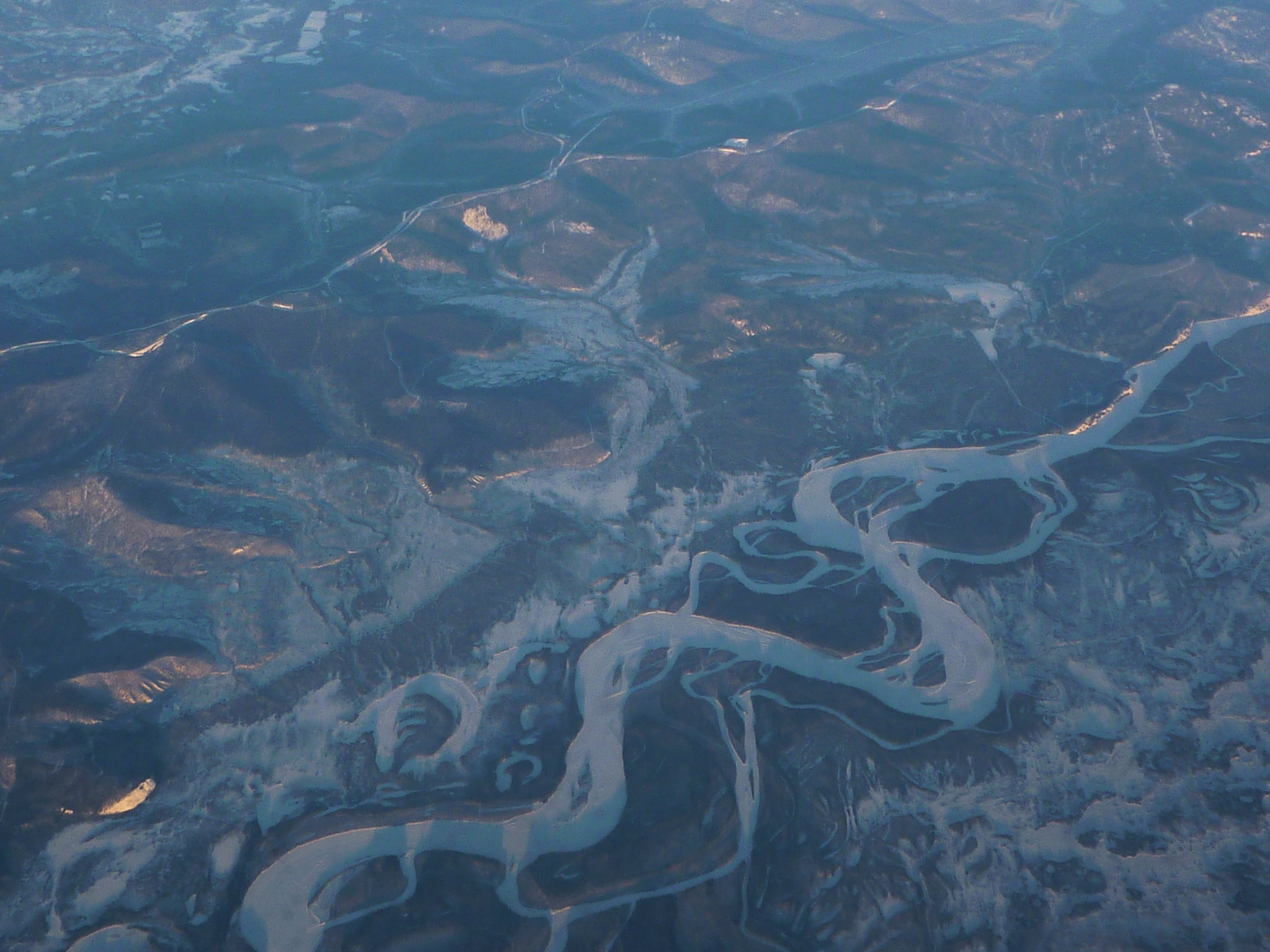
Tanana River in winter, 10 miles (16 km) west of Fairbanks

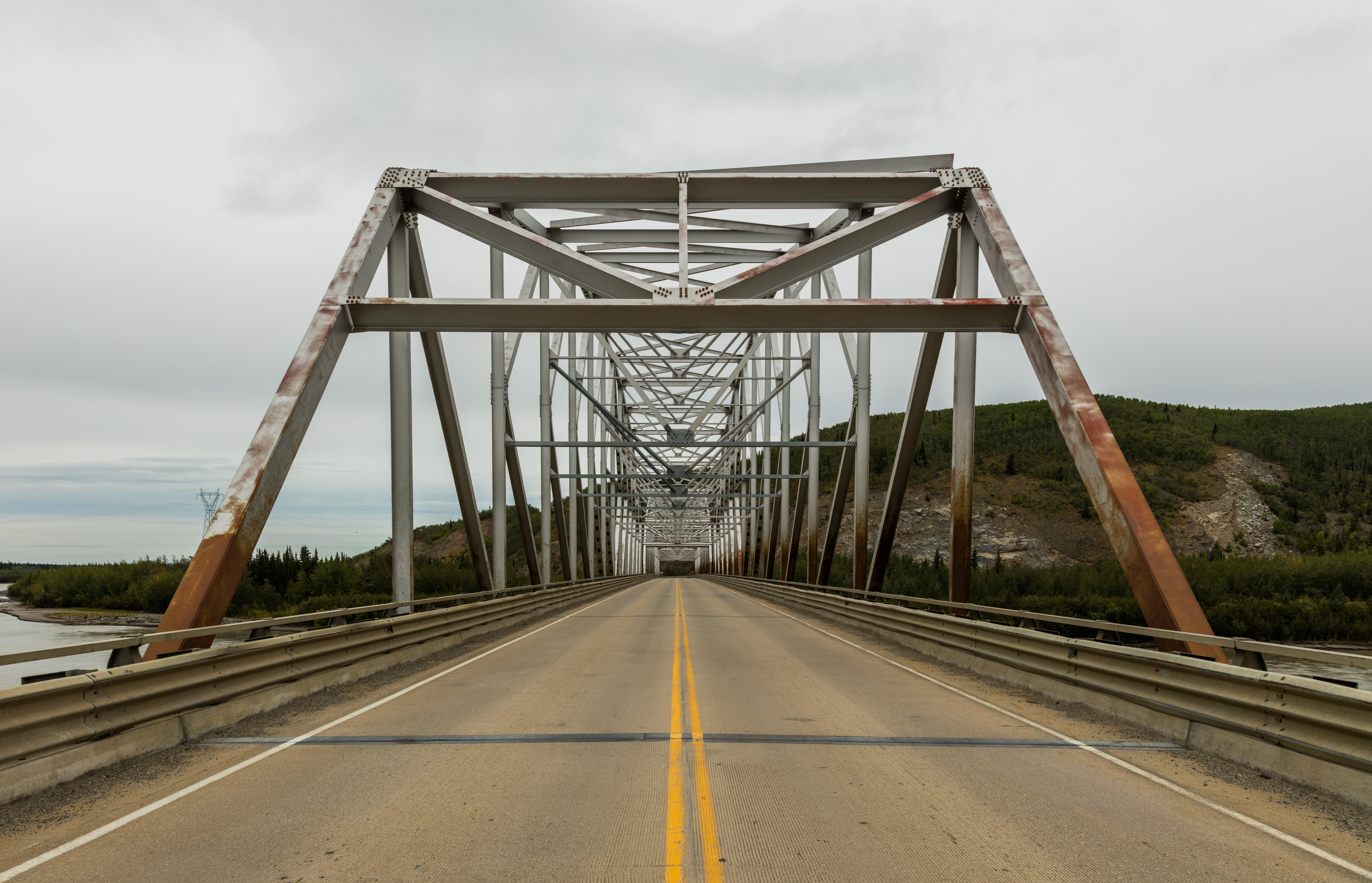
Bridge over the Tanana River in Nenana.

- Chisana River
- Nabesna River
- Kalutna River
- Tok River
- Robertson River
- Johnson River
- Little Gerstle River
- Healy River
- Volkmar River
- Gerstle River
- Clearwater Creek
- Goodpaster River
- Delta River
- Delta Creek
- Little Delta River
- Salcha River
- Little Salcha River
- Chena River
  - North Fork
  - South Fork
- Wood River
- Tatlanika River
- Nenana River
  - Teklanika River
  - Seventeen Mile Slough
- Tolovana River
- Kantishna River
- Zitziana River
- Cosna River
- Chitanana River

== See also ==
- List of rivers of Alaska
- List of longest rivers of the United States (by main stem)

== Notes and references ==
Notes

== Works cited ==
- Benke, Arthur C., ed., and Cushing, Colbert E., ed. (2005). Rivers of North America. Burlington, Massachusetts: Elsevier Academic Press. ISBN 0-12-088253-1.
