= Mount Blackburn =

Volcano in Alaska, United States

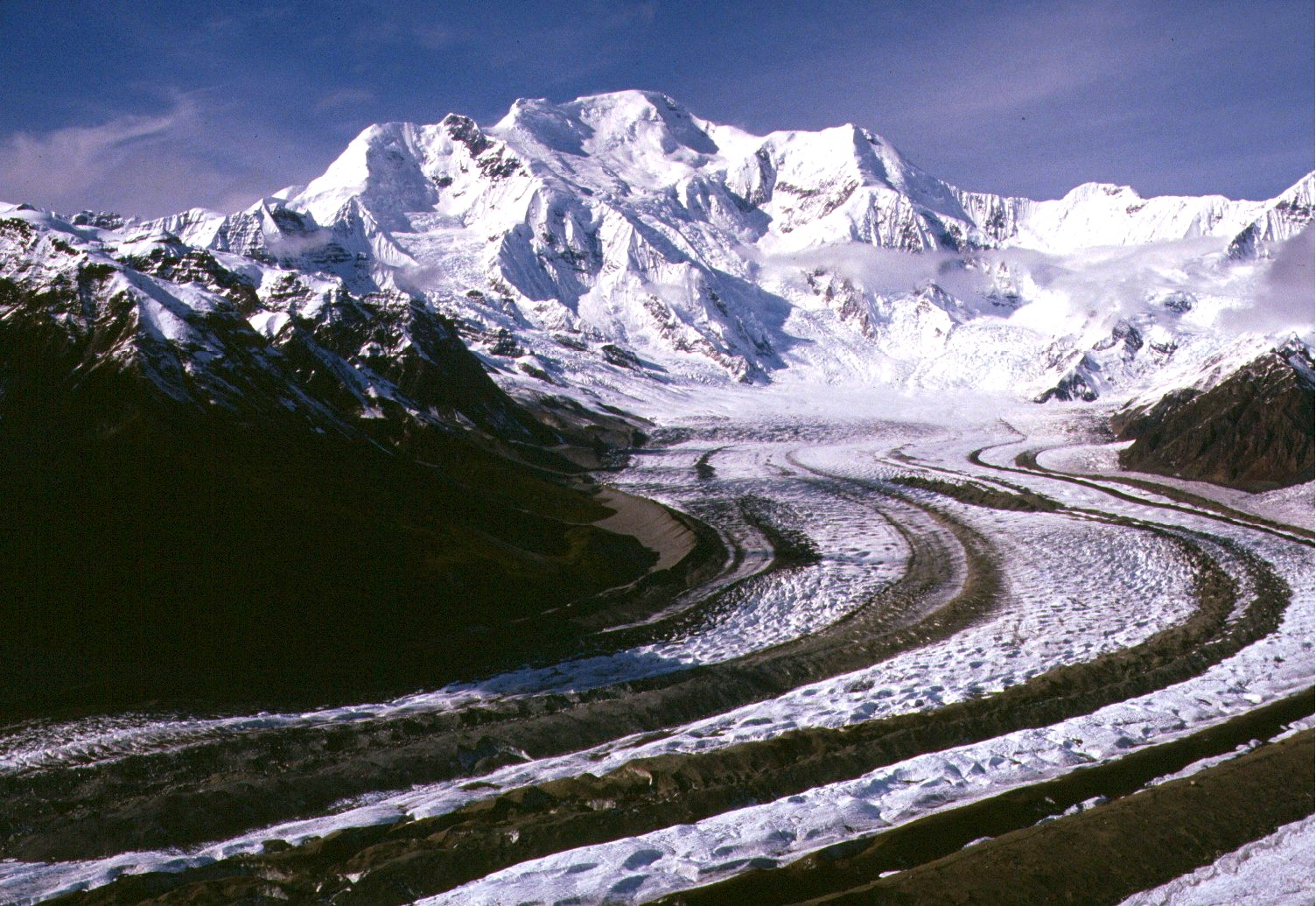
- Mount Blackburn from the southeast, looking up the Kennicott Glacier

Highest point
- Elevation: 16,390 ft (5,000 m)
- Prominence: 11,590 ft (3,530 m)
- Parent peak: Mount Bona (16,550 ft)
- Isolation: 60.7 mi (97.7 km)
- Listing: World most prominent peaks 50th; North America highest peaks 12th; North America prominent peaks 9th; US highest major peaks 5th; Alaska highest major peaks 5th
- Coordinates: 61°43′54″N 143°26′21″W

Naming
- Etymology: Joseph Clay Stiles Blackburn
- Native name: K’ats’i Tl’aadi (Ahtena)

Geography
- Location within Alaska
- Interactive map of Mount Blackburn
- Location: Wrangell-St. Elias National Park and Preserve, Alaska, U.S.
- Parent range: Wrangell Mountains
- Topo map: USGS McCarthy C-7

Geology
- Rock age: 3.4 to 5 million years
- Mountain type: Shield volcano
- Last eruption: 3.4 million years ago

Climbing
- First ascent: 1958 (true summit) Gilbert, Wahlstrom, Gmoser, Bitterlich, and Blumer
- Easiest route: North Ridge: snow/glacier climb

Mount Blackburn (Ahtna: K’ats’i Tl’aadi) is the highest peak in the Wrangell Mountains of Alaska in the United States. It is the fifth-highest peak (Note: This is not counting the North Summit of Denali, which is sometimes counted as an independent peak and sometimes not.) in the United States and the twelfth-highest peak in North America. The mountain is an old, eroded shield volcano, the second-highest volcano in the U.S. behind Mount Bona and the fifth-highest in North America. It was named in 1885 by Lt. Henry T. Allen of the U.S. Army after Joseph Clay Stiles Blackburn, a U.S. senator from Kentucky. It is located in the heart of Wrangell – St. Elias National Park, the largest national park in the country.

== Description ==
The mountain's massif is covered almost entirely by icefields and glaciers and is the principal source of ice for the Kennicott Glacier, which flows southeast over 20 miles (32 km) to just above the town of McCarthy. The mountain also contributes a large volume of ice to the north-flowing Nabesna Glacier and the Kuskulana Glacier system.

Mount Blackburn is a large, dramatic peak, with great local relief and independence from higher peaks. Its west face drops over 11,000 ft (3,350 m) to the Kuskulana Glacier in less than 4 horizontal miles (6.4 km). Its other faces drop 8,000–10,000 ft (2,440–3,050 m), all in less than 8 miles (13 km). The toe of the Kuskulana Glacier, less than 12 miles (19 km) from the summit, lies at an elevation of 2,400 ft (730 m), giving a rise of 14,000 ft (4,270 m). While these figures speak to the peak's relief, one measure of its independence is that it is the 50th-most topographically prominent peak in the world.

The western of Blackburn's two summits is the mountain's highest point, a fact that was not understood until the 1960s when new USGS maps were published. The first ascent of the west peak, and hence Mount Blackburn, was done on May 30, 1958, by Bruce Gilbert, Dick Wahlstrom, Hans Gmoser, Adolf Bitterlich, and Leon Blumer via the North (also called the Northwest) Ridge. This team made the first ascent of Blackburn but did not even know it at the time due to the incorrect identification of the highest point. Blumer's article in the 1959 American Alpine Journal is titled "Mount Blackburn – Second Ascent."

== Other subfeatures ==
Kennedy Peak, or East Blackburn, 16,286 ft (4,964 m), is the eastern summit and was originally thought to be the highest point. The first ascent of this summit was made in 1912 by Dora Keen and George Handy via the Kennicott Glacier (on the south side of the mountain) and East Face. This heady exploit was ahead of its time. Dora Keen, driven by a deep desire for the climb, solicited miners from the nearby Kennecott Copper Mines, and forged a route up the heavily crevassed East Face to the East Peak, but did not traverse over to the West Peak. Keen went on to write a famous article for the Saturday Evening Post titled, "First up Mount Blackburn." In 1912, Keen and Handy thought they were on Blackburn's highest point. Keen's summit is recognized as the first summit of an Alaskan peak by a woman.

== Geology ==
Mount Blackburn represents the heavily eroded core of a shield volcano. Because it is shrouded in permanent ice, its internal structure cannot be determined. It is believed to have a summit caldera, greatly modified by glaciation. The oldest rocks in the area are granites, about 4.2 million years old, representing an intrusive mass. The majority of the mountain is 3.4 million year old granite, intruding between andesite flows. From this it is inferred that a caldera collapse took place between 4.2 and 3.4 million years ago, after which activity ceased.

== Climbing ==
Today's standard route on the peak is the 1958 ascent route, the North (or Northwest) Ridge, which is approached from the Nabesna Glacier, on the north side of the mountain, opposite from Keen and Hardy's route. The route starts from an airstrip on the glacier at an altitude of 7,200 feet (2,200 m). It is a moderate climb by Alaskan standards (Alaska Grade 2).

== Gallery ==
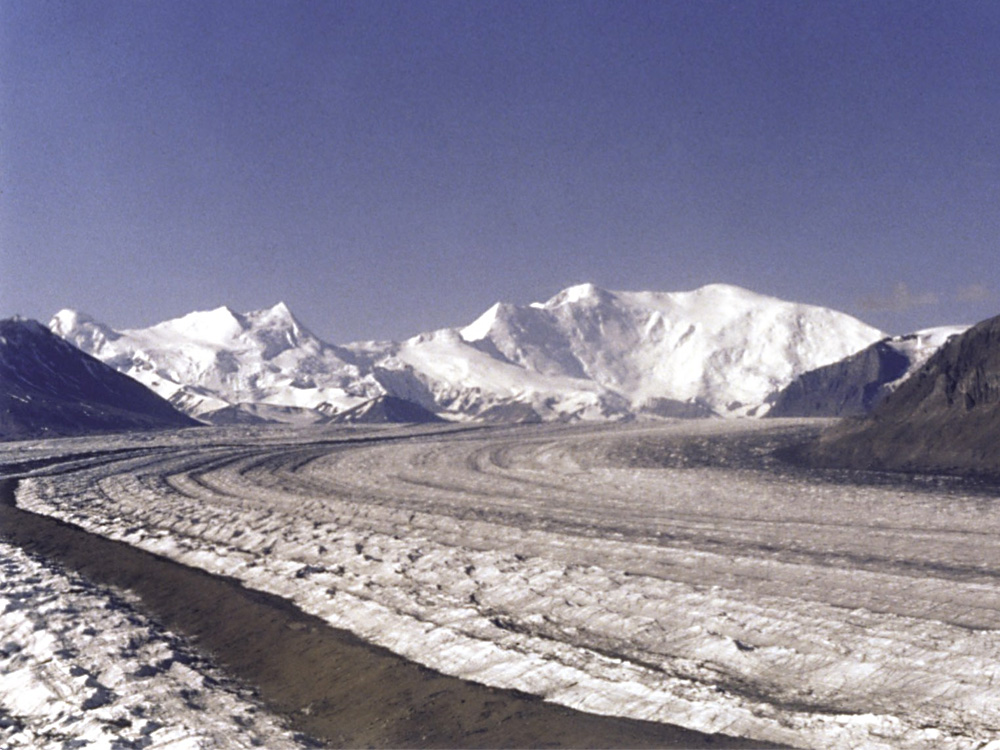
The Nabesna Glacier, with Mount Blackburn and its two summits at right; Atna Peaks is the twin summit left of center

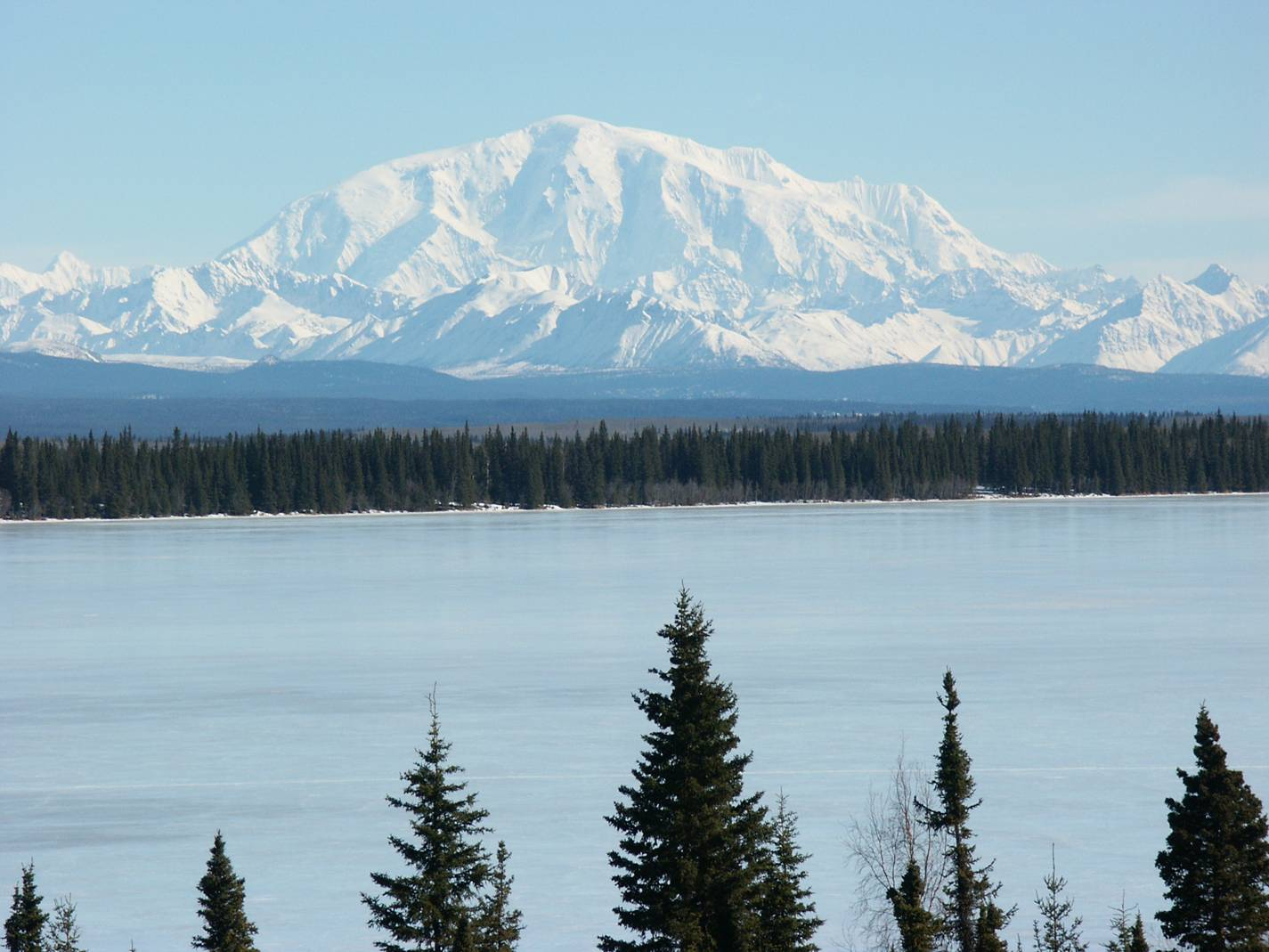
Mount Blackburn from the west, looking across Willow Lake

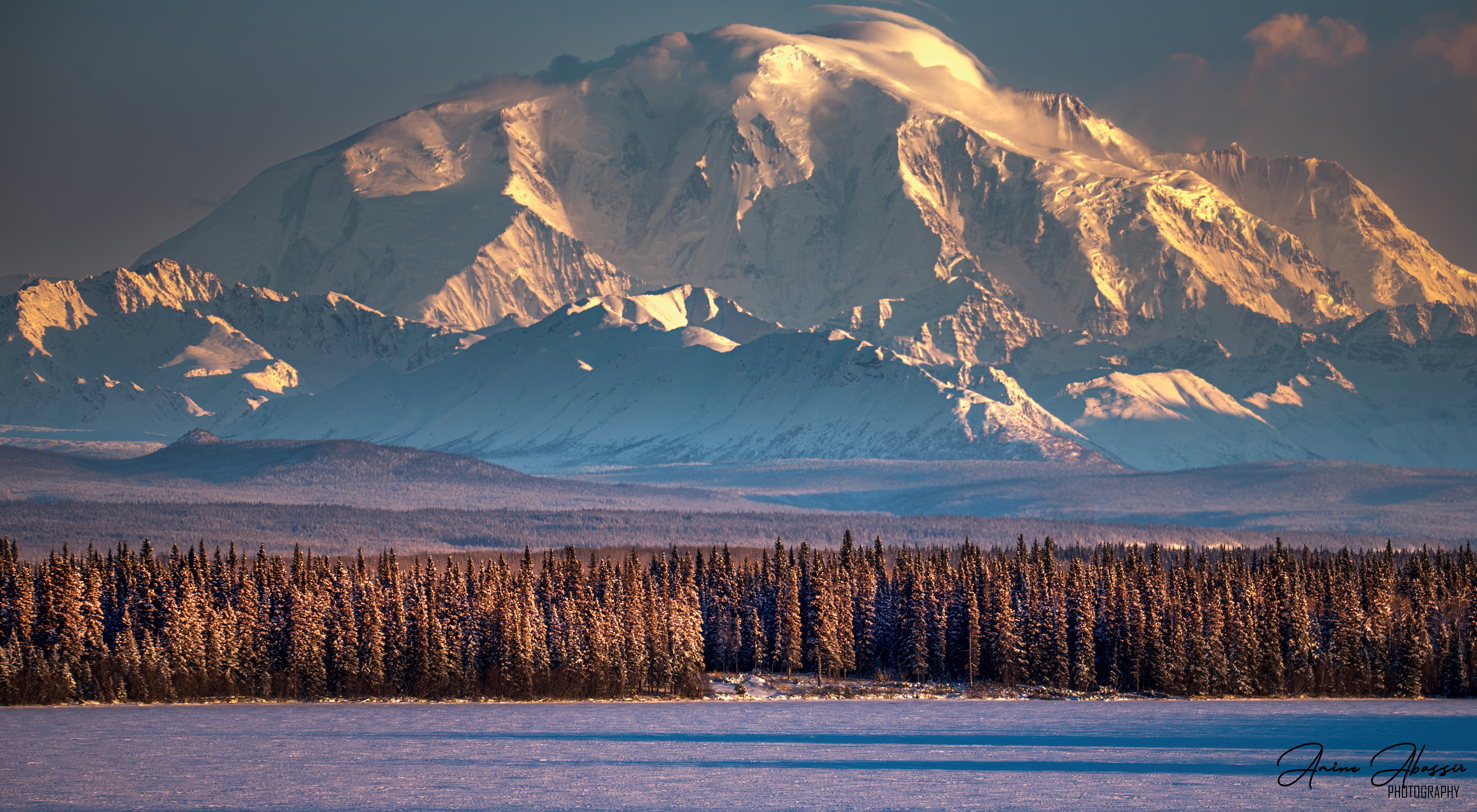
Mount Blackburn and Willow Lake at sunset

== See also ==
- List of mountain peaks of North America
  - List of mountain peaks of the United States
    - List of mountain peaks of Alaska
- List of the highest major summits of the United States
- List of the most prominent summits of the United States
- List of the most isolated major summits of the United States
- List of volcanoes in the United States

== Sources ==
- Wood, Michael; Coombs, Colby (2001). Alaska: A Climbing Guide. Mountaineers Books. ISBN 0-89886-724-X.
- Winkler, Gary R. (2000). A Geologic Guide to Wrangell—Saint Elias National Park and Preserve, Alaska: A Tectonic Collage of Northbound Terranes. USGS Professional Paper 1616. ISBN 0-607-92676-7.
- Richter, Donald H.; Preller, Cindi C.; Labay, Keith A.; Shew, Nora B. (2006). Geologic Map of the Wrangell-Saint Elias National Park and Preserve, Alaska. USGS Scientific Investigations Map 2877.
