= Kuskulana River =

River in Alaska, United States

Coordinates: 61.4700°N 144.1819°W

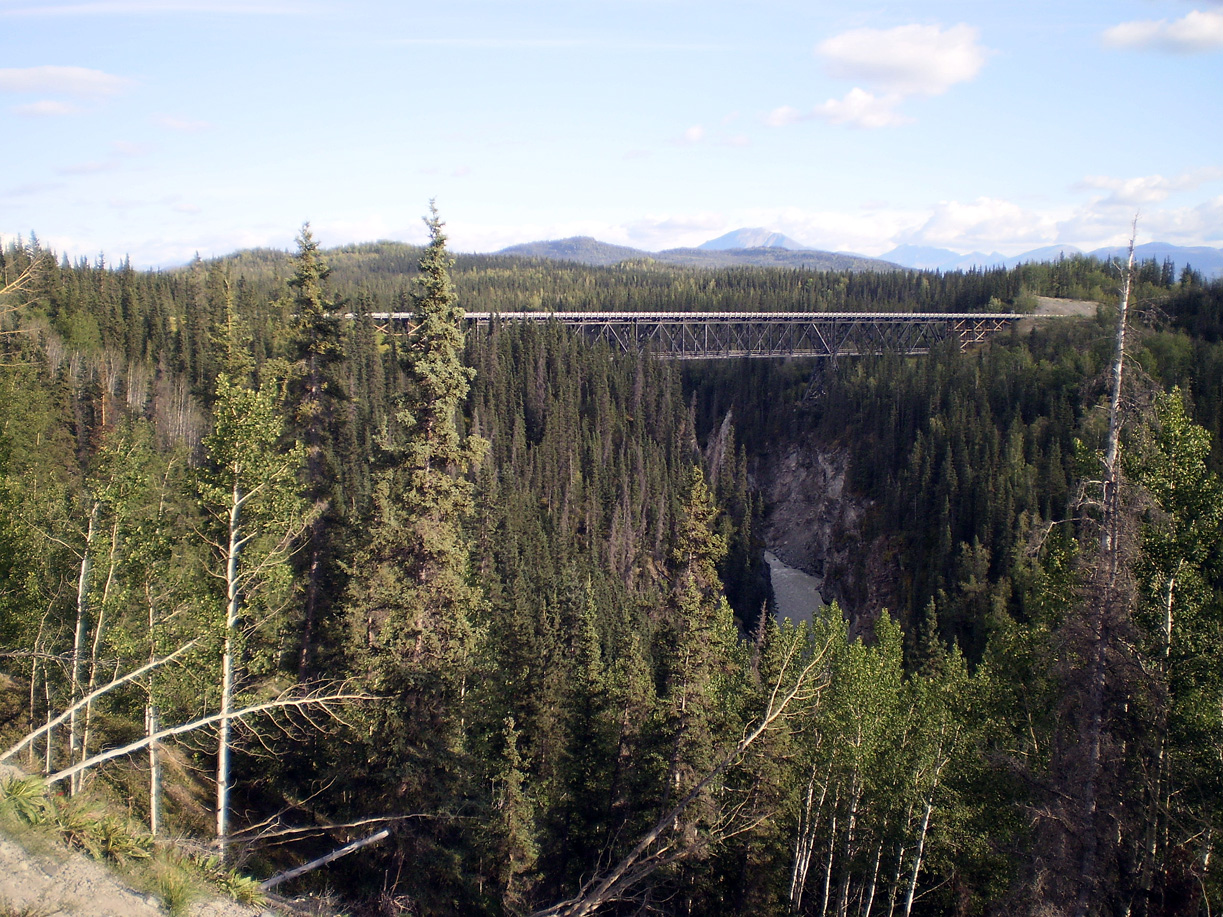
Kuskulana River Bridge

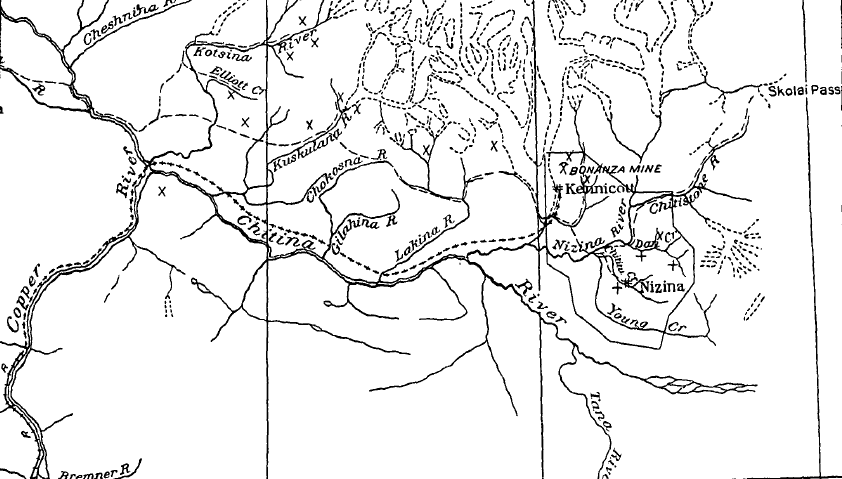
Map of the Kuskulana River

Kuskulana River is a waterway in the U.S. state of Alaska. It is located in the Wrangell–St. Elias National Park and Preserve.

== Geography ==
The stream has its source in Kuskulana Glacier at an elevation of about 2,200 feet. It flows southwestward for about 21 miles and joins Chitina River about 10 miles above the Copper at an elevation of approximately 600 feet, thus having an average grade of a little over 75 feet per mile. The main body of Kuskulana Glacier is about 11 miles long and slopes from east to west with an average width of about one-third mile. It receives four northern branches that emanate from the south and west slopes of Mount Blackburn. The basin above the Chitina Valley is exceedingly rugged. The snowfall in the higher mountains is said to be heavy, accumulating in massive drifts in the gulches and sheltered spots and in some places lasting throughout the summer. The river derives its main supply from Kuskulana Glacier and is heavily laden with glacial silt and sand.

In the upper 10 miles of its course the river passes through a broad gravel-filled flat, with high mountains on either side; its lower course of 11 miles across the Chitina Valley lies for much of the way through a steep rock-walled canyon. At the railroad crossing the rails are about 220 feet above the water surface, and the canyon within rock walls is about 170 feet deep. The width at the water surface, about 200 feet below the bridge, measured 70 feet, and the width at the top was estimated to be about 150 feet. The canyon affords many excellent dam sites. Below Strelna Creek it is in many places particularly narrow and its walls are nearly vertical. The river is said to get very low in the winter and goes dry at places in the upper basin above the canyon, where the underlying formation is composed of loose material. There is no opportunity for large storage in the basin, but the river offers opportunity for the development of a thousand-horsepower or more for five or six months during the year by the construction of a dam at the canyon; but the winter flow is undoubtedly too low to warrant the operation of such a plant, even though ice difficulties could be overcome.

== Tributaries ==
The tributary streams above the canyon are all small. Nugget Creek, which is the largest, enters the main stream from the west just below the glacier. It drains an area of 12.1 square miles and falls about 800 feet in the lower 2 miles. Several other minor streams in the upper basin have heavy grades. Strelna Creek, the most important tributary of the Kuskulana, heads in the ridge south of the Kotsina River, at an elevation of 6,000 to 7,000 feet, and enters the Kuskulana between 4 and 5 miles from the Chitina. It is about 12 miles long. The lower 6 miles of its course he across the Chitina Valley plateau, with a grade of about 200 feet per mile. There are no glaciers in its basin, and the summer flow depends on rainfall and melting snow in the headwaters. Some winters it is said to go dry; in others there is a small flow even during the coldest weather.

== See also ==
- List of rivers of Alaska
