= Kuskulana Glacier =

Glacier in Alaska, United States

- Location within Alaska
- Interactive map of Kuskulana Glacier
- Location: Alaska, U.S.
- Coordinates: 61°37′00″N 143°42′00″W
- Status: Retreating

The Kuskulana Glacier is a glacier in the Wrangell Mountains of Alaska.

The Kuskulana Glacier trends southwest 24 km (15 mi) from Mount Blackburn to its terminus at the head of Kuskulana River, 46 km (29 mi) northwest of McCarthy in the Wrangell Mountains.

Kuskulana is an Indian name given in 1900 by T. G. Gerdine of the US Geological Survey.

== See also ==
- List of glaciers
- National Park Service Flyer of Trail along the glaciers with maps and photos
- Topo map
