= Chitina River =

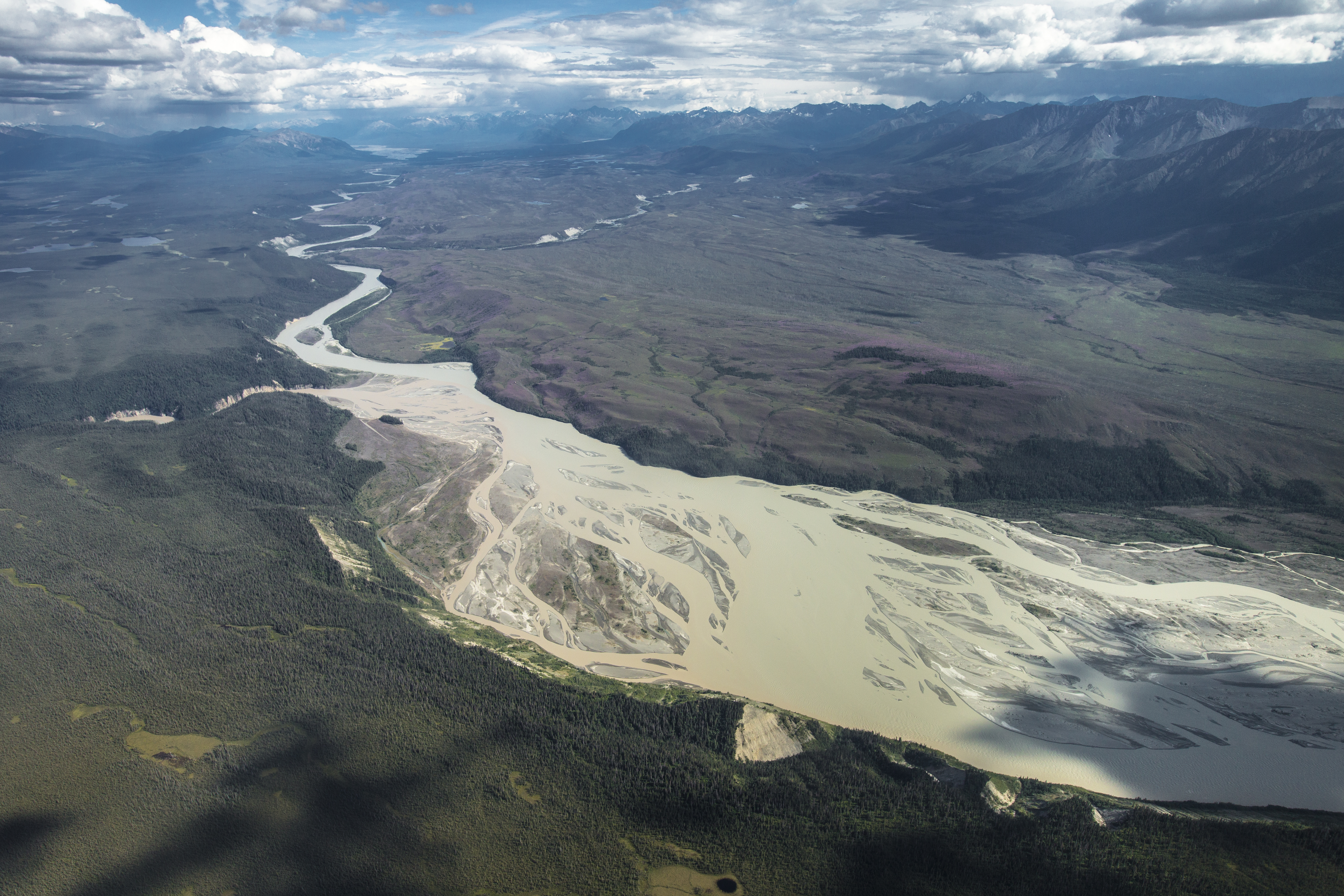
- Chitina River below the confluences of the Nizina and Chakina Rivers

- Location of the mouth of the Chitina River in Alaska

Location
- Country: United States
- State: Alaska
- Census Area: Copper River

Physical characteristics
- Source: Chitina Glacier
  - location: Saint Elias Mountains, Wrangell–St. Elias National Park and Preserve
  - coordinates: 60°51′40″N 141°24′01″W
  - elevation: 3,507 ft (1,069 m)
- Mouth: Copper River
  - location: 1.2 miles (1.9 km) east of Chitina; 66 miles (106 km) northeast of Valdez, Chugach Mountains
  - coordinates: 61°29′50″N 144°25′10″W
  - elevation: 466 ft (142 m)
- Length: 274 km (170 mi)
- Basin size: 21,800 km^{2} (8,400 sq mi)

Basin features
- Tributaries
  - left: Kiagna River, Tana River, Chakina River, Tebay River
  - right: Short River, Clear Stream, Nizina River, Lakina River, Gilahina River, Kuskulana River

The Chitina River (Ahtna Athabascan Tsedi Na’ [tʃɛ.diː.näʔ] < tsedi "copper" + na’ "river") is a 274 km (170 mi) tributary of the Copper River in the U.S. state of Alaska. It begins in the Saint Elias Mountains at the base of Chitina Glacier and flows generally northwest through the Wrangell–St. Elias National Park and Preserve to meet the smaller river near Chitina. The watershed was once a major copper mining region.

== Recreation ==
The Chitina River is suitable for floating in rafts, kayaks, and decked canoes by boaters with sufficient wilderness and whitewater skills. From a put-in place near Hubert's Landing, slightly downstream of Chitina Glacier, the river is Class II (medium) on the International Scale of River Difficulty all the way to the mouth at Chitina.

Boaters starting from Hubert's Landing will have to make a difficult 2.5-mile (4.0 km) portage to reach the main river channel. It is also possible to put in at Jake's Bar, about halfway between the glacier and the river mouth. The shorter trip requires no portage.

Hazards include cold silty water, bad weather, and the remote location. Grizzlies pose a danger to boaters, especially near the mouths of clear tributaries, where the bears tend to congregate. A variety of salmon, attractive to bears, migrate to and from these tributaries.

== Tributaries ==
The most important tributaries of the Chitina are from the north and emanate principally from the south slope of the Wrangell Mountains; in order downstream they are Nizina, Lakina, Gilahina, and Kuskulana rivers. From the south the main affluents are the Tana, Chakina, and Tebay rivers, which rise in the Chugach Mountains. Kiagna River is also a southern tributary of Chitina River.

The Tebay River, and an associated set of lakes and smaller streams in the Tebay watershed, offer "the potential for some of the finest wilderness angling experiences to be had in Southcentral Alaska", according to Alaska Fishing. The main game fish in the Tebay system are rainbow trout, lake trout, and Arctic grayling.

== Gallery ==
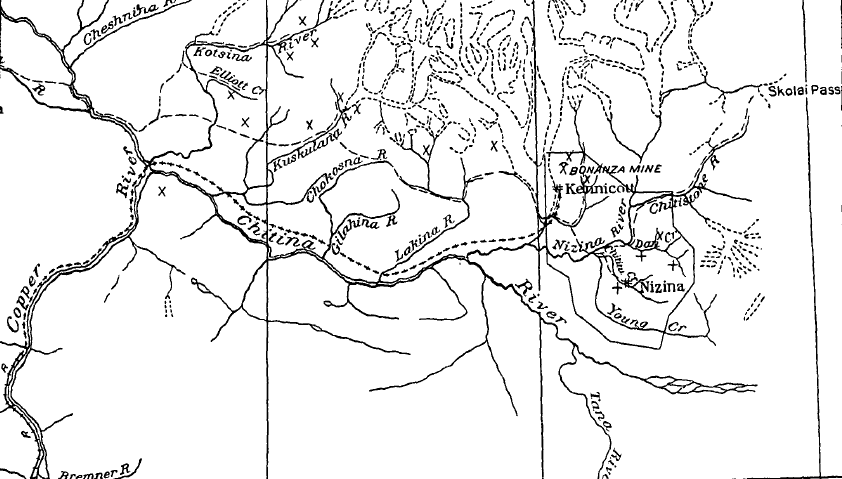
Map of the Chitina River

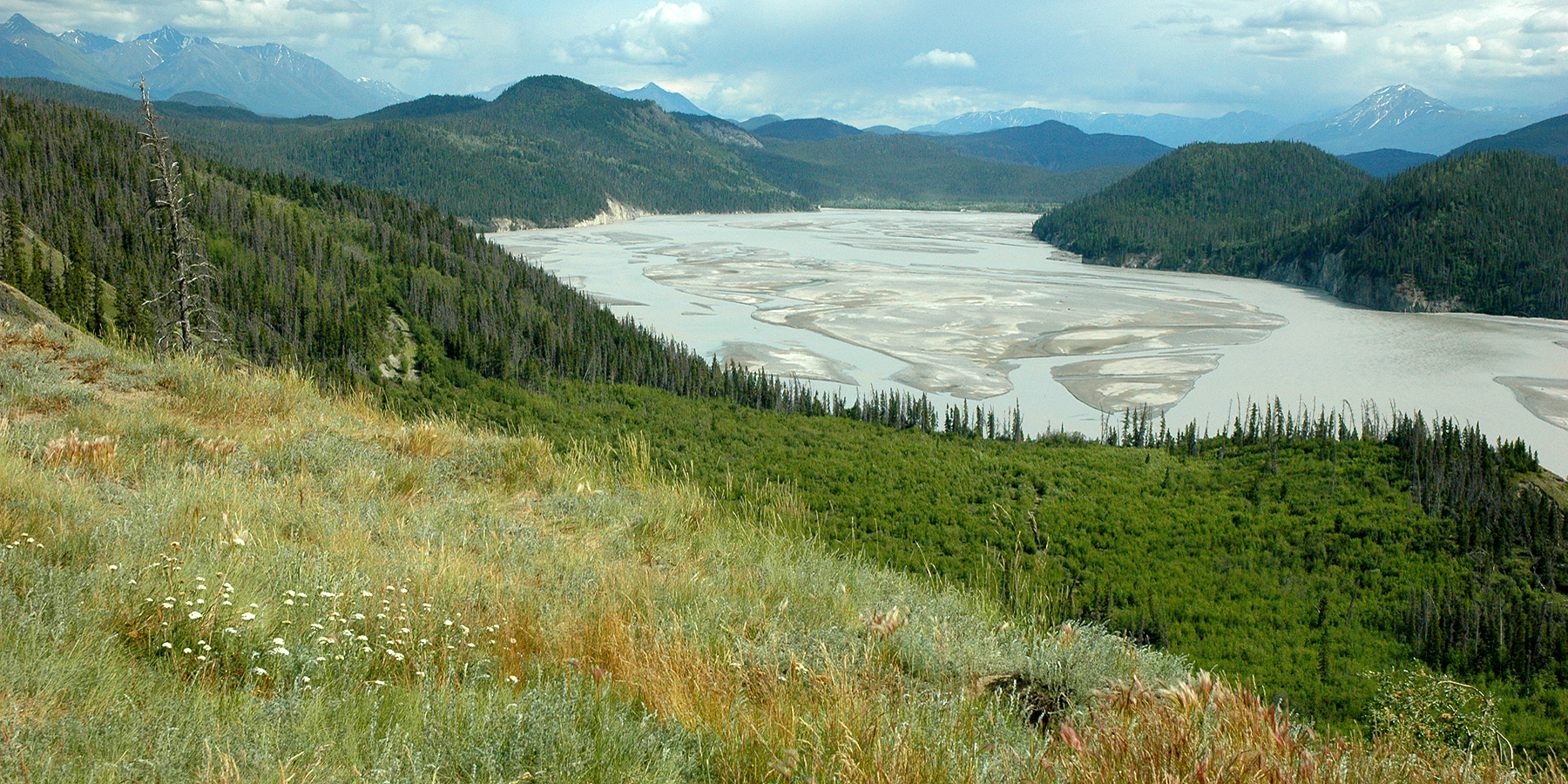
Chitina River from McCarthy Road, east of Chitina, Alaska, USA (28 June 2009)

== See also ==
- List of rivers of Alaska
