= Tetlin National Wildlife Refuge =

- IUCN category IV (habitat/species management area)
- Location within Alaska
- Location: Alaska, United States
- Nearest city: Northway, Alaska / Beaver Creek, Yukon
- Coordinates: 62.6666667°N 141.8333333°W
- Area: 700,058 acres (2,833.03 km^{2})
- Established: 1980
- Governing body: U.S. Fish and Wildlife Service
- Website: Telin NWR

Tetlin National Wildlife Refuge is a dynamic landscape made up of forests, wetlands, tundra, lakes, mountains and glacial rivers bounded by the snowy peaks of the Alaska Range. This upper Tanana River valley has been called the "Tetlin Passage", because it serves as a major migratory route for birds traveling to and from Canada, the lower 48 and both Central and South America. Many of these birds breed and nest on the refuge. Others pass through on their way to breeding and nesting grounds elsewhere in the state. Migrants, including ducks, geese, swans, cranes, raptors and songbirds, begin arriving in the valley in April, and continue into early June. An estimated 116 species breed on Tetlin during the short summer, when long days and warm temperatures accelerate the growth of plants, insects and other invertebrates, providing a ready source of rich foods for nesting birds.

Tetlin Refuge also supports a variety of large mammals. Dall sheep dot the higher slopes while Alaskan moose feed upon the tender new growth that springs up in the wake of frequent lightning caused fires. Wolf packs, turkey vulture, Canadian lynx, tundra swan, red fox, peregrine falcon, coyote, beaver, golden eagle, marten, six species of owls, snowshoe hare, osprey, trumpeter swan, muskrat, bald eagle, river otter, grizzly bears and black bears and members of three different caribou herds range over the refuge.

Two of the six known humpback whitefish spawning areas in the Yukon River drainage are located within the refuge. Along with caribou and moose, these fish are important subsistence resources for area residents. Arctic grayling, northern pike and burbot are also found in the refuge's many streams and lakes.

The refuge has a surface area of 700,058 acres (2,833.03 km^{2}), and is one of the larger (currently #18) National Wildlife Refuges in the United States, although, perhaps surprisingly, also the second-smallest of the sixteen in Alaska.

== Gallery ==
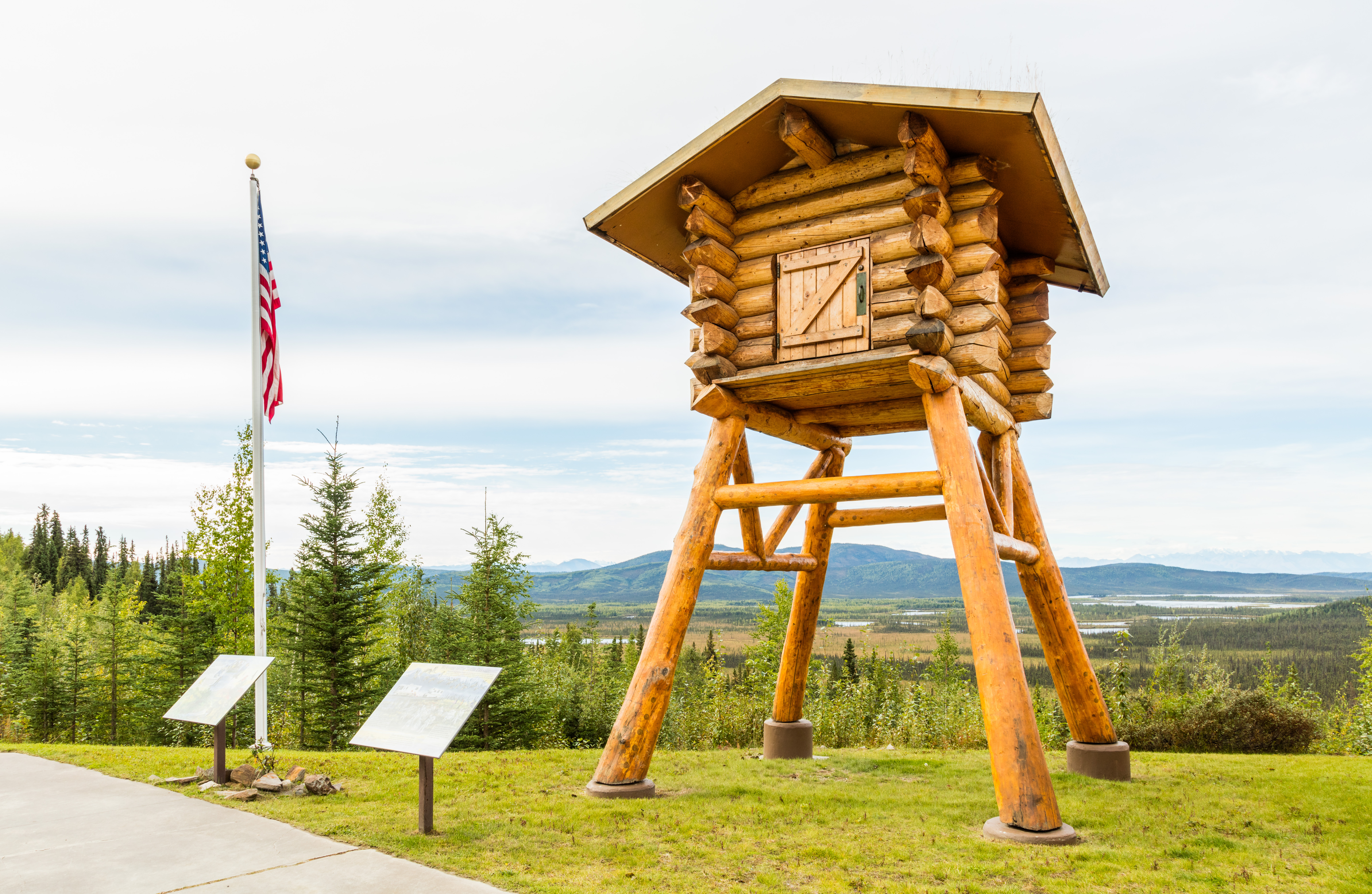

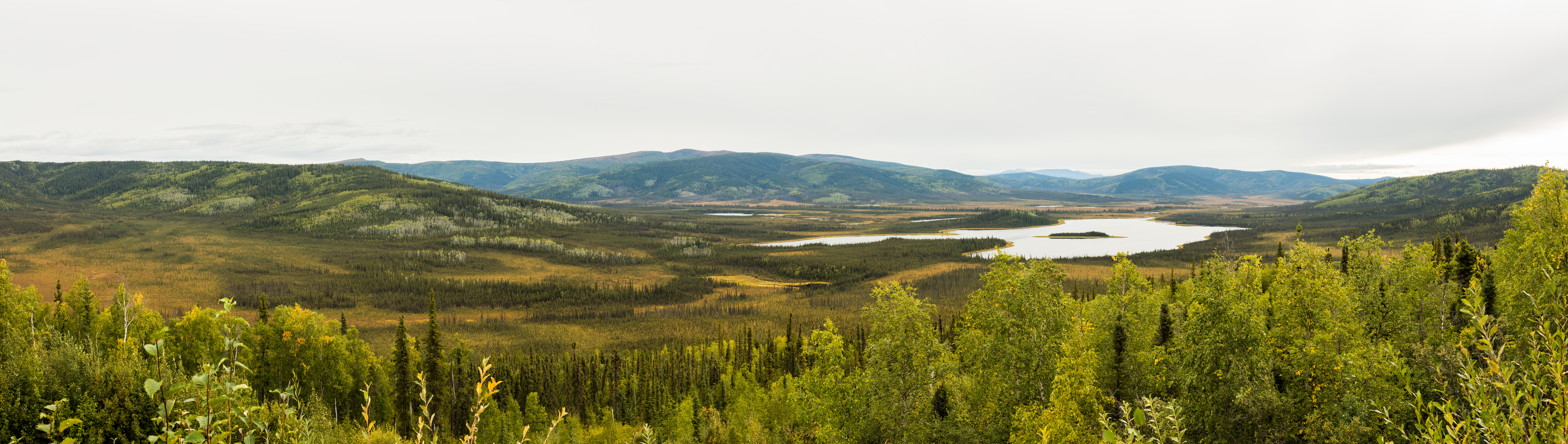

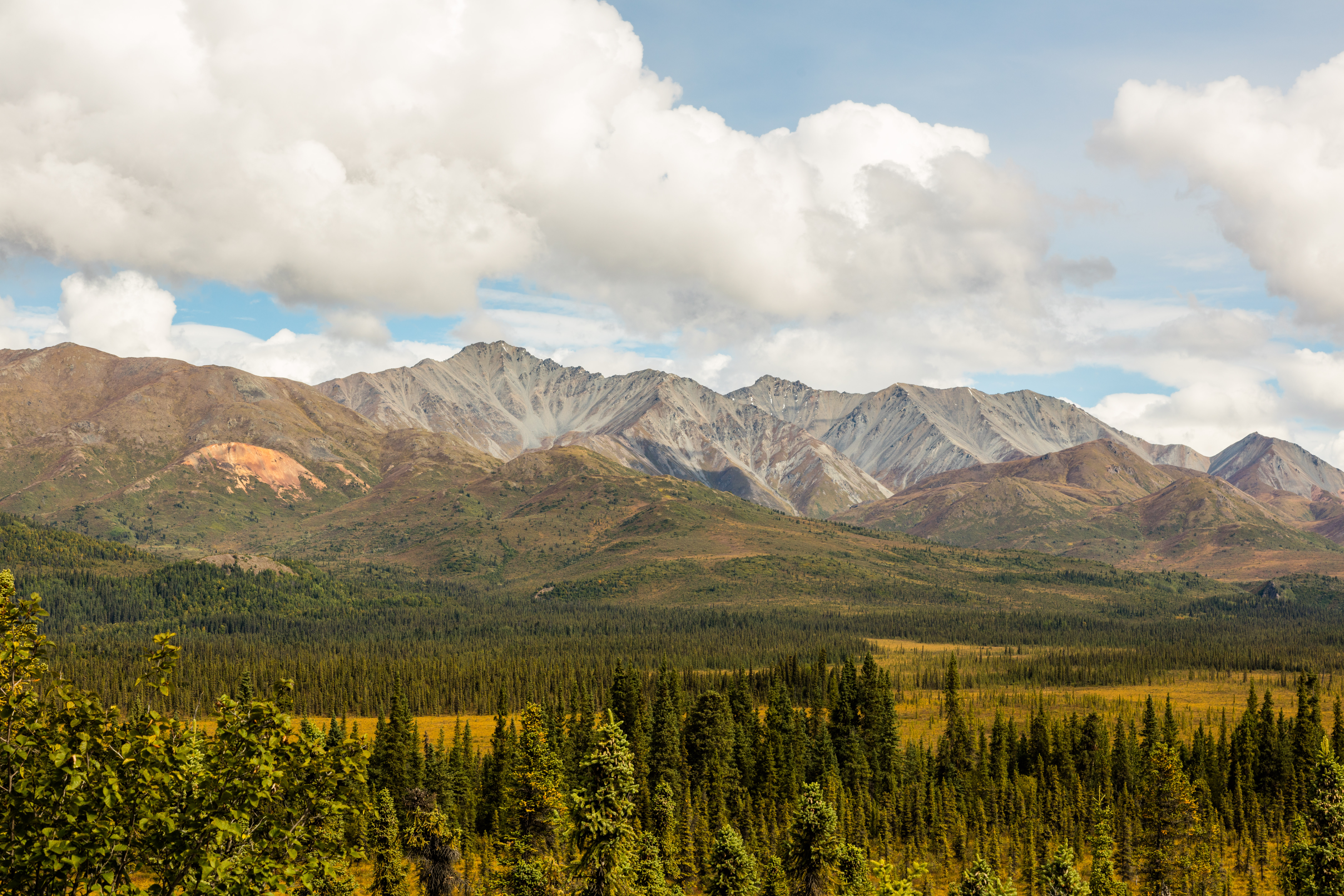

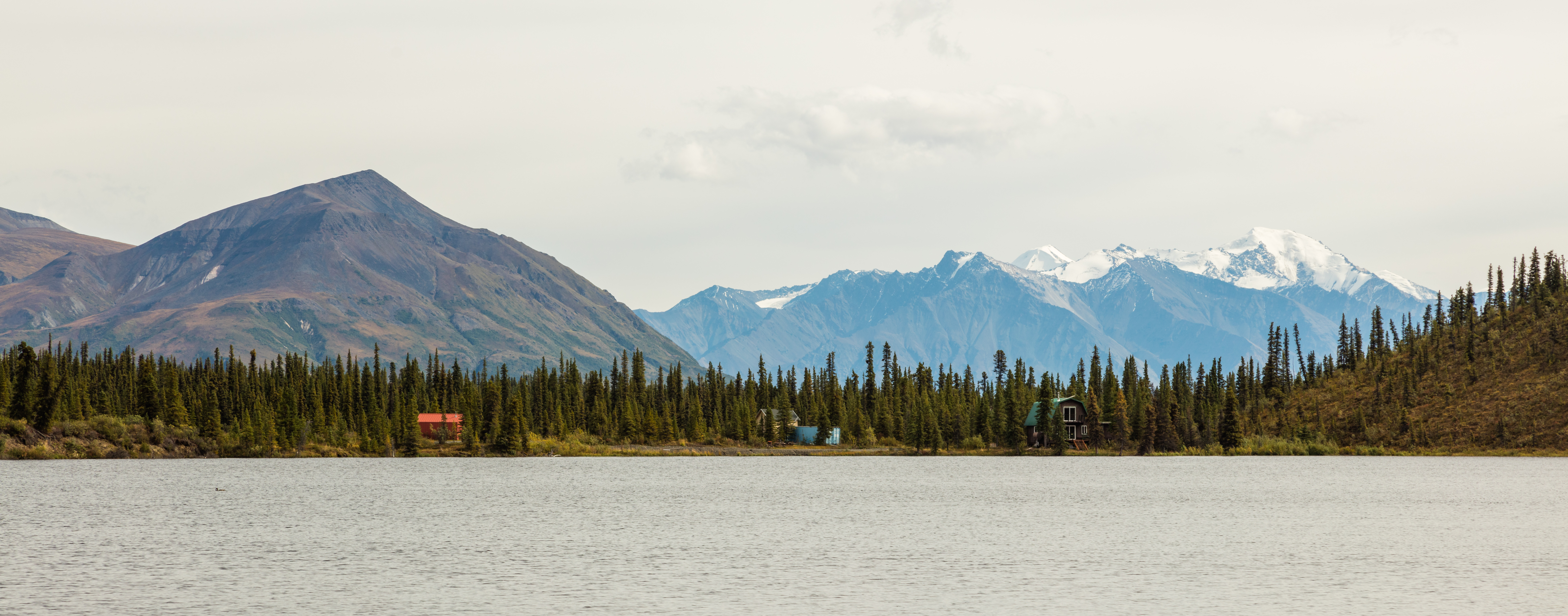

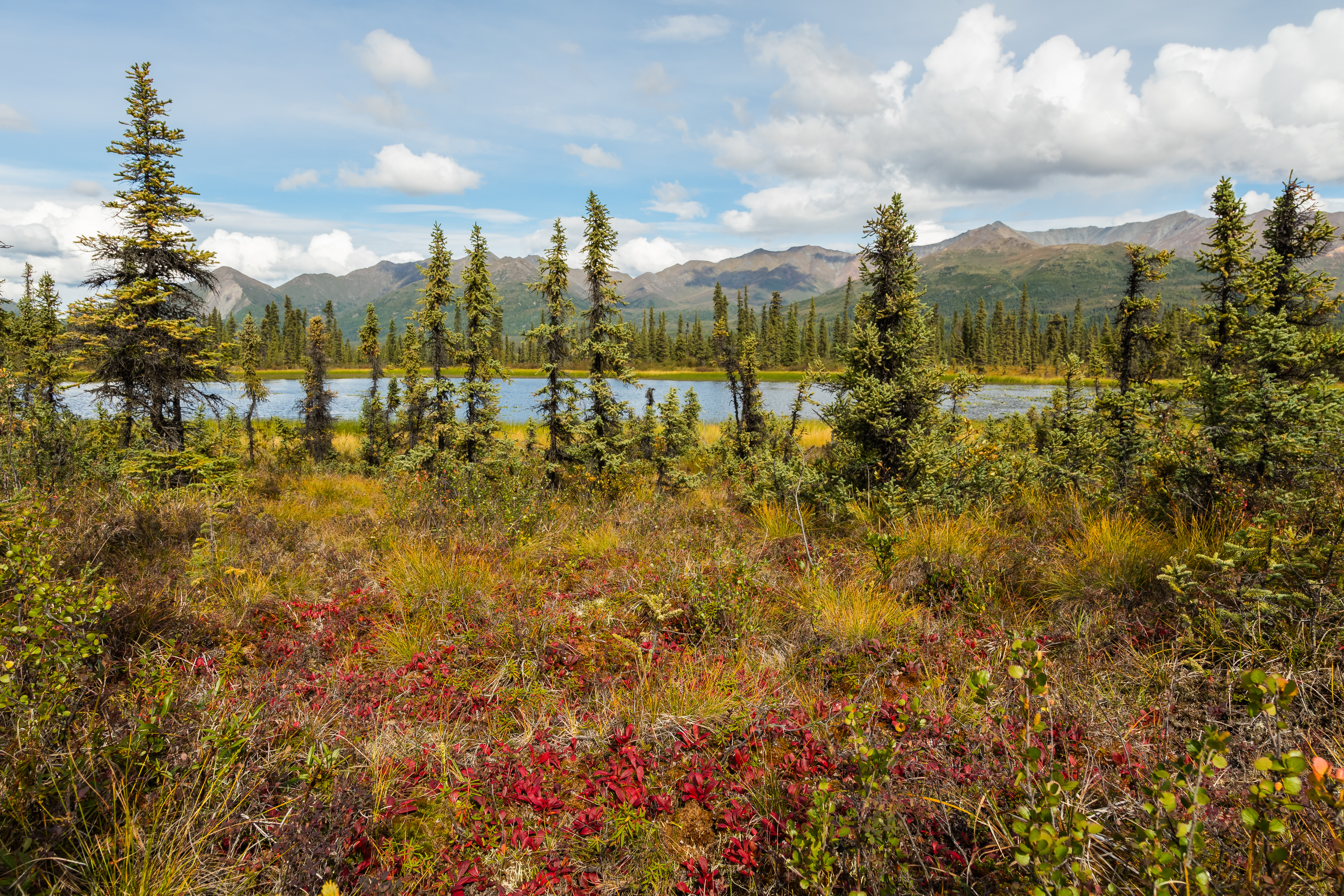

== See also ==
- List of largest National Wildlife Refuges
