= Unorganized Borough, Alaska =

Portions of Alaska outside 19 organized boroughs

- Borough
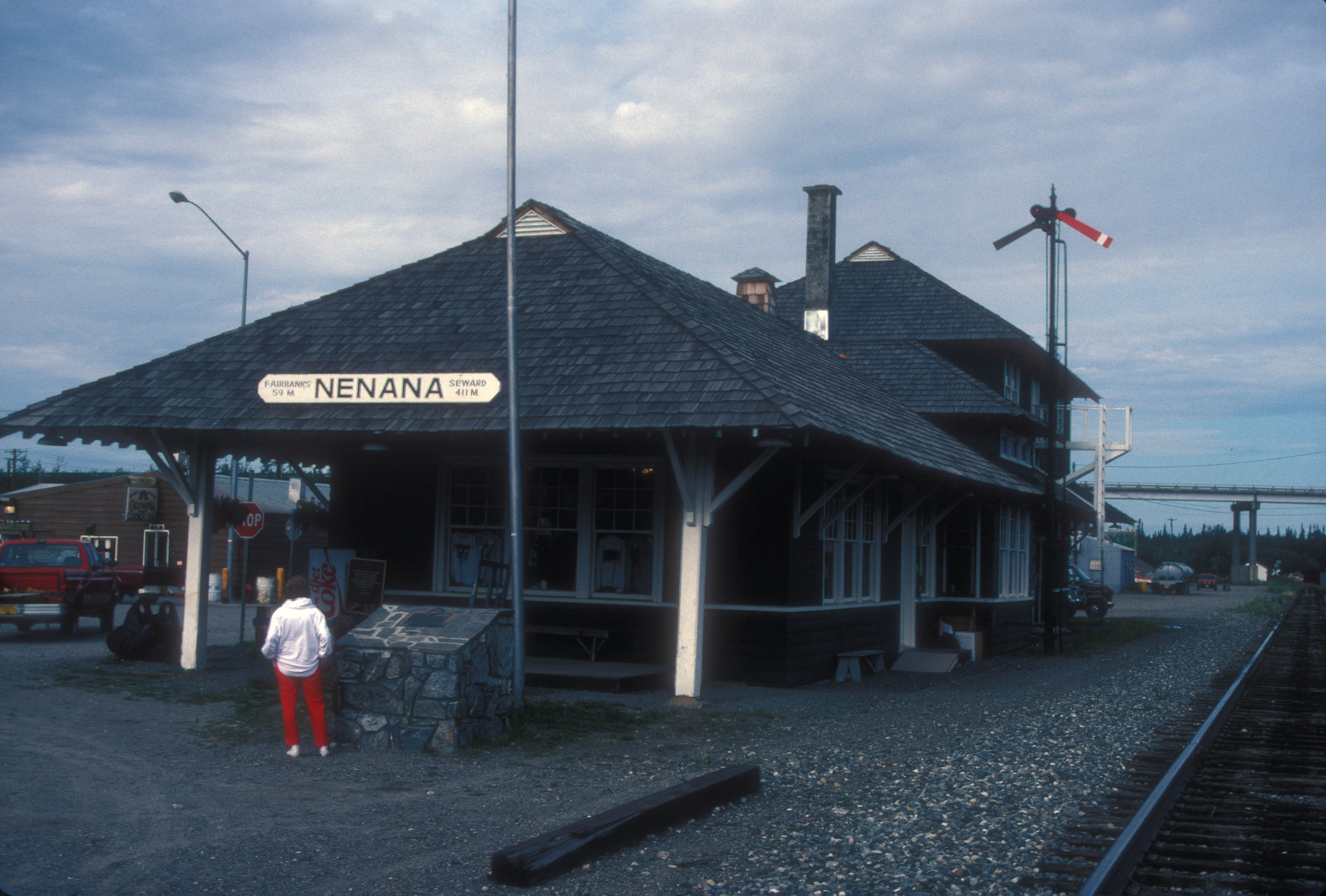
- Nenana Depot

- Location within the U.S. state of Alaska
- Coordinates: 57°30′N 156°42′W
- Country: United States
- State: Alaska
- Founded: 1961
- Named for: Lack of an organic act establishing an administrative agency or local government
- Seat: Government of Alaska
- Largest community: Bethel

Area
  - Total: 323,440 sq mi (837,700 km^{2})

Population (2020)
  - Total: 77,157
  - Estimate (2025): 75,441 ▼
  - Density: 0.24/sq mi (0.092/km^{2})
- Time zones: UTC−9 (Alaska)
  - Summer (DST): UTC−8 (ADT)
- UTC−10 (Hawaii–Aleutian)
  - Summer (DST): UTC−9 (HADT)

The Unorganized Borough is composed of portions of the U.S. state of Alaska which are not contained in any of its 19 organized boroughs. While referred to as the "Unorganized Borough", it is not a borough itself, as it forgoes that level of government structure. It encompasses nearly half of Alaska's land area, 323,440 square miles (837,700 km^{2}), and, as of the 2020 U.S. census, it had a population of 77,157, which was 10.52% of the population of the state. The largest communities in the Unorganized Borough are the cities of Bethel, Unalaska, and Valdez.

== Overview ==
This vast area has no local government other than that of school districts, municipalities, and tribal village governments. Except within some incorporated cities, all government services in the Unorganized Borough, including law enforcement, are provided by the state or by a tribal government. School districts in the Unorganized Borough are operated either by cities, in those limited instances when the city has chosen to undertake those powers, or through the general guidance of the Alaska Department of Education under the auspices of Rural Education Attendance Areas.

=== Census areas ===
Unique among the United States, Alaska is not entirely subdivided into county equivalents. To facilitate census-taking in the vast unorganized area, the United States Census Bureau, in cooperation with the state, divided the unorganized borough into 11 census areas, beginning with the 1970 Census and undergoing border or name adjustments most recently in 2007, 2008, 2013, 2015, and 2019.

Census area	FIPS code	Largest town	Etymology	Density	Population	Area	Map
Aleutians West Census Area	016	Unalaska	Location in the western Aleutian Islands.	1.27	5,240	4,394 sq mi (11,380 km^{2})	State map highlighting Aleutians West Census Area
Bethel Census Area	050	Bethel	City of Bethel, the largest settlement in the census area, which is itself named for the Biblical term Bethel ("house of God").	0.45	18,391	40,631 sq mi (105,234 km^{2})	State map highlighting Bethel Census Area
Chugach Census Area	063	Valdez	The Chugach people (Part of Valdez–Cordova Census Area prior to January 2, 2019)	0.71	6,553	9,530 sq mi (24,683 km^{2})	State map highlighting Chugach Census Area
Copper River Census Area	066	Glennallen	The Copper River (Part of Valdez–Cordova Census Area prior to January 2, 2019)	0.11	2,666	24,692 sq mi (63,952 km^{2})	State map highlighting Copper River Census Area
Dillingham Census Area	070	Dillingham	The city of Dillingham, the largest settlement in the area, which was named after United States Senator Paul Dillingham (1843-1923), who toured Alaska with his Senate subcommittee in 1903.	0.27	4,483	18,334 sq mi (47,485 km^{2})	State map highlighting Dillingham Census Area
Hoonah–Angoon Census Area	105	Hoonah	The cities of Hoonah and Angoon	0.33	2,271	6,555 sq mi (16,977 km^{2})	State map highlighting Hoonah–Angoon Census Area
Kusilvak Census Area	158	Hooper Bay	Kusilvak Mountains (Known as Wade Hampton prior to 2015)	0.48	7,932	17,077 sq mi (44,229 km^{2})	State map highlighting Kusilvak Census Area
Nome Census Area	180	Nome	City of Nome, the largest settlement in the census area.	0.43	9,830	22,970 sq mi (59,492 km^{2})	State map highlighting Nome Census Area
Prince of Wales–Hyder Census Area	198	Craig	Prince of Wales Island and the town of Hyder (Known as Prince of Wales-Outer Ketchikan prior to the expansion of Ketchikan Gateway Borough in 2008)	1.18	5,777	5,264 sq mi (13,634 km^{2})	State map highlighting Prince of Wales–Hyder Census Area
Southeast Fairbanks Census Area	240	Deltana	Its location, southeast of Fairbanks	0.28	7,270	24,823 sq mi (64,291 km^{2})	State map highlighting Southeast Fairbanks Census Area
Yukon–Koyukuk Census Area	290	Fort Yukon	Yukon River ("great river" in Gwich’in), which flows through the census area; and the city of Koyukuk	0.04	5,028	145,576 sq mi (377,040 km^{2})	State map highlighting Yukon–Koyukuk Census Area

== History ==
During the 1950s, when the push for the territory of Alaska to become a state was at its height, any municipal government was extremely limited and scattered. Territory-wide, there were no more than a few dozen incorporated cities, and a small handful of service districts, broken into public utility districts and independent school districts. The service districts were authorized by the territorial legislature in 1935 to allow unincorporated areas limited powers to provide services and to raise taxes for them.

The United States Congress had forbidden the territory from establishing counties in keeping with the wishes of large fishing and mining companies, which wanted powers over natural resources, land and money to remain with the federal government. The delegates to the convention which wrote the Alaska Constitution had, in fact, debated the merits of establishing counties, and had rejected the idea in favor of creating a system of boroughs, both organized and unorganized.

The intent of the framers of the constitution was to provide for maximum local self-government with a minimum of local government units and tax-levying jurisdictions. The minutes of the constitutional convention indicate that counties were not used as a form of local government for various reasons. The failure of some local economies to generate enough revenue to support separate counties was an important issue, as was the desire to use a model that would reflect the unique character of Alaska, provide for maximum local input, and avoid a body of county case law already in existence.

Instead, Alaska adopted boroughs as a form of regional government. This regionalization tried to avoid having a number of independent, limited-purpose governments with confusing boundaries and inefficient governmental operations, as the territorial service districts had been. The boroughs were widely seen as an important foundation for the government to provide services without becoming all-powerful and unnecessarily intrusive, an argument which surfaced time and time again during various attempts by the legislature to create organized boroughs out of portions of the unorganized borough.

The Alaska State Legislature adopted the borough structure in 1961, and envisioned boroughs to serve as an "all-purpose" form of local government, to avoid the perceived problems of county government in the lower 48 states as well as Hawaii. According to Article X of the Alaska Constitution, areas of the state unable to support borough government were to be served by several unorganized boroughs, which were to be mechanisms for the state to regionalize services; however, separate unorganized boroughs were never created. The entire state was defined as one vast unorganized borough by the Borough Act of 1961, and over the ensuing years, Alaska's organized boroughs were carved out of it.

Alaska's first organized borough, and the only one incorporated immediately after passage of the 1961 legislation, was the Bristol Bay Borough. The pressure from residents of other areas of the state to form boroughs led to the Mandatory Borough Act of 1963, which called for all election districts in the state over a certain minimum population to incorporate as boroughs by January 1, 1964.

A resolution of the State of Alaska's Local Boundary Commission introduced in January 2009 spells this out in greater detail:

- WHEREAS, the 1963 Alaska State Legislature passed, and Governor Egan signed into law, the "Mandatory Borough Act" (Chapter 52, SLA 1963), dictating that certain regions of Alaska – those encompassing Ketchikan, Juneau, Sitka, Kodiak Island, Kenai Peninsula, Anchorage, the Matanuska-Susitna valleys, and Fairbanks – form organized boroughs by January 1, 1964.

Furthermore, 21 Rural Education Attendance Areas were established by the Legislature in 1975. This created regional divisions of the unorganized borough for the purpose of establishing rural school districts. Many REAAs were later absorbed into organized boroughs.

== Regional Educational Attendance Areas ==
There are 19 Regional Educational Attendance Areas in the unorganized borough.

Regional name	Headquarters	REAA or Borough School Locations	Notes
Alaska Gateway	Tok	Dot Lake Eagle Northway Tanacross Tetlin	Northeast central Alaska area
Aleutian Region	Anchorage	Atka Nikolski	Adak (closed)
Annette Island	Metlakatla		
Bering Straits	Unalakleet	Norton Sound Elim Golovin Koyuk Saint Michael Shaktoolik Stebbins White Mountain Seward Peninsula Brevig Mission Shishmaref Teller Wales Saint Lawrence Island Gambell Savoonga	
Chatham	Angoon	Gustavus	Elfin Cove (closed), Cube Cove (closed)
Chugach	Anchorage	Chenega Bay Tatitlek Whittier	
Copper River	Glennallen	Kenny Lake Slana	Chistochina (closed), Copper Center (closed), Gakona (closed), Nelchina (closed)
Delta/Greely	Delta Junction	Gerstle River	Healy Lake (closed), Fort Greely (closed)
Iditarod	McGrath	Anvik Grayling Holy Cross Nikolai Shageluk Takotna	Lake Minchumina (closed), Lime Village (closed)
Kuspuk	Aniak	Crooked Creek Chuathbaluk Lower Kalskag Sleetmute Stony River Upper Kalskag	Red Devil (closed)
Lower Kuskokwim	Nunivak Island Mekoryuk		
Lower Yukon	Mountain Village	Alakanuk Emmonak Hooper Bay Kotlik Marshall Nunam Iqua Pilot Station Russian Mission Scammon Bay	Pitkas Point (closed)
Pribilof Islands	Saint Paul		Saint George (closed)
Southeast Island		Coffman Hollis Kasaan Naukati Port Alexander Thorne Bay Whale Pass	Edna Bay (closed), Port Protection (closed)
Southwest Region	Aleknagik	Clark's Point Ekwok Koliganek Manokotak New Stuyahok Togiak Twin Hills	Portage Creek (closed)
Yukon Flats	Fort Yukon	Arctic Village Beaver Chalkyitsik Circle Rampart Stevens Village Venetie	Birch Creek (closed), Central (closed)
Yukon-Koyukuk	College, Fairbanks North Star Borough	Allakaket Hughes Huslia Kaltag Koyukuk Manley Hot Springs Minto Nulato Ruby	Bettles (closed)
Yupiit (Akiachak, Akiak, Tuluksak)	Akiachak	Akiak Atmautluak Bethel Chefornak Eek Goodnews Bay Kasigluk Kipnuk Kongiganak Kwethluk Kwigillingok Napakiak Napaskiak Newtok Nightmute Nunapitchuk Oscarville Platinum Quinhagak Toksook Bay Tuluksak Tuntutuliak Tununak	
Kashunamiut (Chevak)	Chevak		

== Dispute over future mandatory boroughs ==
A number of boroughs have been incorporated since the Mandatory Borough Act, but most (the primary examples being North Slope, Northwest Arctic, and Denali) were incorporated to exploit a significant potential source of taxation, such as natural resource extraction and tourism.

Many residents of the Unorganized Borough, particularly those in the larger communities which may be most susceptible to organized borough incorporation, have been opposed to such incorporation, and say the status quo suits them just fine.

On the other hand, many Alaskans residing in organized boroughs feel that they unfairly subsidize residents of the Unorganized Borough, especially for education. In 2003, the Alaska Division of Community Advocacy identified eight areas within the Unorganized Borough meeting standards for incorporation. Bills have been introduced in the Alaska Legislature to compel these areas to incorporate, though as of 2009, none have been signed into law.

== Communities ==
=== Cities ===
- Adak
- Akiak
- Alakanuk
- Aleknagik
- Allakaket
- Angoon
- Aniak
- Anvik
- Atka
- Bethel
- Bettles
- Brevig Mission
- Chefornak
- Chevak
- Chuathbaluk
- Clark's Point
- Coffman Cove
- Cordova
- Craig
- Delta Junction
- Dillingham
- Diomede
- Eagle
- Edna Bay
- Eek
- Ekwok
- Elim
- Emmonak
- Fort Yukon
- Galena
- Gambell
- Golovin
- Goodnews Bay
- Grayling
- Gustavus
- Holy Cross
- Hoonah
- Hooper Bay
- Hughes
- Huslia
- Hydaburg
- Kake
- Kaltag
- Kasaan
- Kotlik
- Koyuk
- Koyukuk
- Klawock
- Kwethluk
- Lower Kalskag
- Manokotak
- Marshall
- McGrath
- Mekoryuk
- Mountain Village
- Napakiak
- Napaskiak
- Nenana
- New Stuyahok
- Nightmute
- Nikolai
- Nome
- Nulato
- Nunapitchuk
- Nunam Iqua (formerly Sheldon Point)
- Pelican
- Pilot Station
- Platinum
- Port Alexander
- Quinhagak
- Ruby
- Russian Mission
- Savoonga
- Scammon Bay
- Shageluk
- Shaktoolik
- Shishmaref
- St. George
- St. Mary's
- St. Michael
- St. Paul
- Stebbins
- Tanana
- Teller
- Tenakee Springs
- Thorne Bay
- Togiak
- Toksook Bay
- Unalakleet
- Unalaska
- Upper Kalskag
- Valdez
- Wales
- Whale Pass
- White Mountain
- Whittier

=== Census-designated places ===
- Akiachak
- Alatna
- Alcan Border
- Arctic Village
- Atmautluak
- Attu Station
- Beaver
- Big Delta
- Birch Creek
- Central
- Chalkyitsik
- Chenega
- Chicken
- Chisana
- Chistochina
- Chitina
- Circle
- Copper Center
- Coldfoot
- Crooked Creek
- Deltana
- Dot Lake
- Dot Lake Village
- Dry Creek
- Eagle Village
- Eareckson Station
- Elfin Cove
- Evansville
- Flat
- Fort Greely
- Four Mile Road
- Gakona
- Game Creek
- Glennallen
- Gulkana
- Healy Lake
- Hollis
- Hyder
- Kasigluk
- Kenny Lake
- Kipnuk
- Klukwan
- Koliganek
- Kongiganak
- Kwigillingok
- Lake Minchumina
- Lime Village
- Livengood
- Manley Hot Springs
- McCarthy
- Mendeltna
- Mentasta Lake
- Mertarvik
- Metlakatla
- Minto
- Nabesna
- Naukati Bay
- New Allakaket
- Newtok
- Nelchina
- Nikolski
- Northway Junction (former)
- Northway Village (former)
- Oscarville
- Paxson
- Pitkas Point
- Point Baker
- Port Clarence
- Port Protection
- Portage Creek
- Rampart
- Red Devil
- Silver Springs
- Slana
- Sleetmute
- Stevens Village
- Stony River
- Takotna
- Tanacross
- Tatitlek
- Tazlina
- Tetlin
- Tok
- Tolsona
- Tonsina
- Tuluksak
- Tuntutuliak
- Tununak
- Twin Hills
- Venetie
- Whitestone
- Whitestone Logging Camp
- Willow Creek
- Wiseman

=== Unincorporated communities ===
- Bill Moore's Slough
- Chuloonawick
- Copperville
- Crow Village
- Cube Cove
- Eyak
- Hamilton
- Haycock
- Georgetown
- Napaimute
- Ohogamiut
- Solomon
- Umkumiute
- Waterfall

=== Indian reservation ===
- Annette Island

== See also ==
- Unorganized Yukon, a similar area in the neighboring Canadian territory of Yukon
