= Valdez–Cordova Census Area, Alaska =

Former census area in Alaska, United States

- Borough
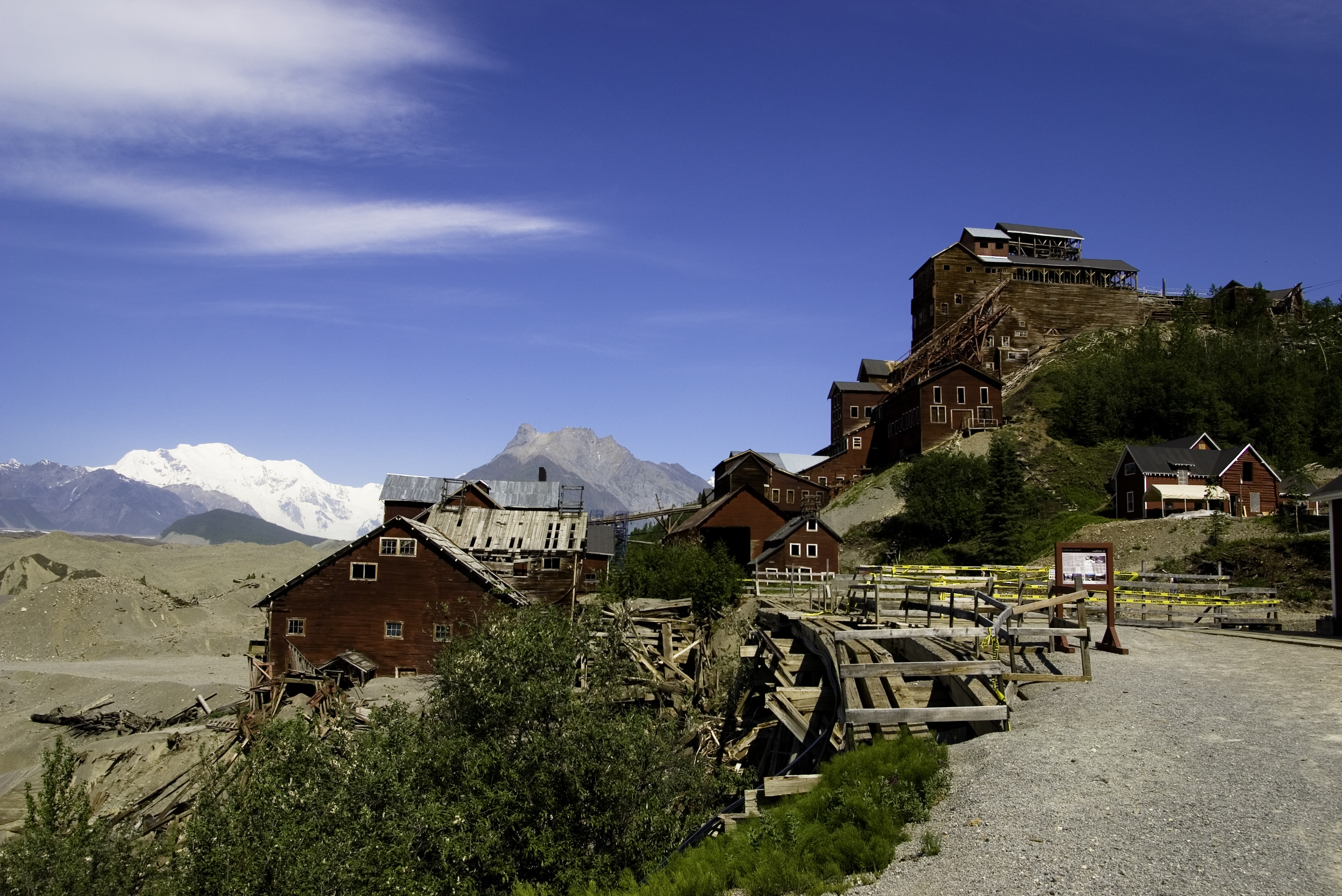
- Abandoned mining camp at Kennecott, Alaska.

- Location within the U.S. state of Alaska
- Coordinates: 61°24′N 144°30′W
- Country: United States
- State: Alaska
- Existed: 1980-2019
- Largest city: Valdez

Area
  - Total: 40,340 sq mi (104,500 km^{2})
  - Land: 34,240 sq mi (88,700 km^{2})
  - Water: 6,100 sq mi (16,000 km^{2}) 15.1%

Population
  - Total: 9,202
  - Density: 0.28/sq mi (0.11/km^{2})
- Time zone: UTC−9 (Alaska)
  - Summer (DST): UTC−8 (ADT)
- Congressional district: At-large

Valdez–Cordova Census Area was a census area located in the state of Alaska, United States. As of the 2010 census, the population was 9,636. It was part of the Unorganized Borough and therefore had no borough seat. On January 2, 2019, it was abolished and replaced by the Chugach Census Area and the Copper River Census Area.

== Geography ==
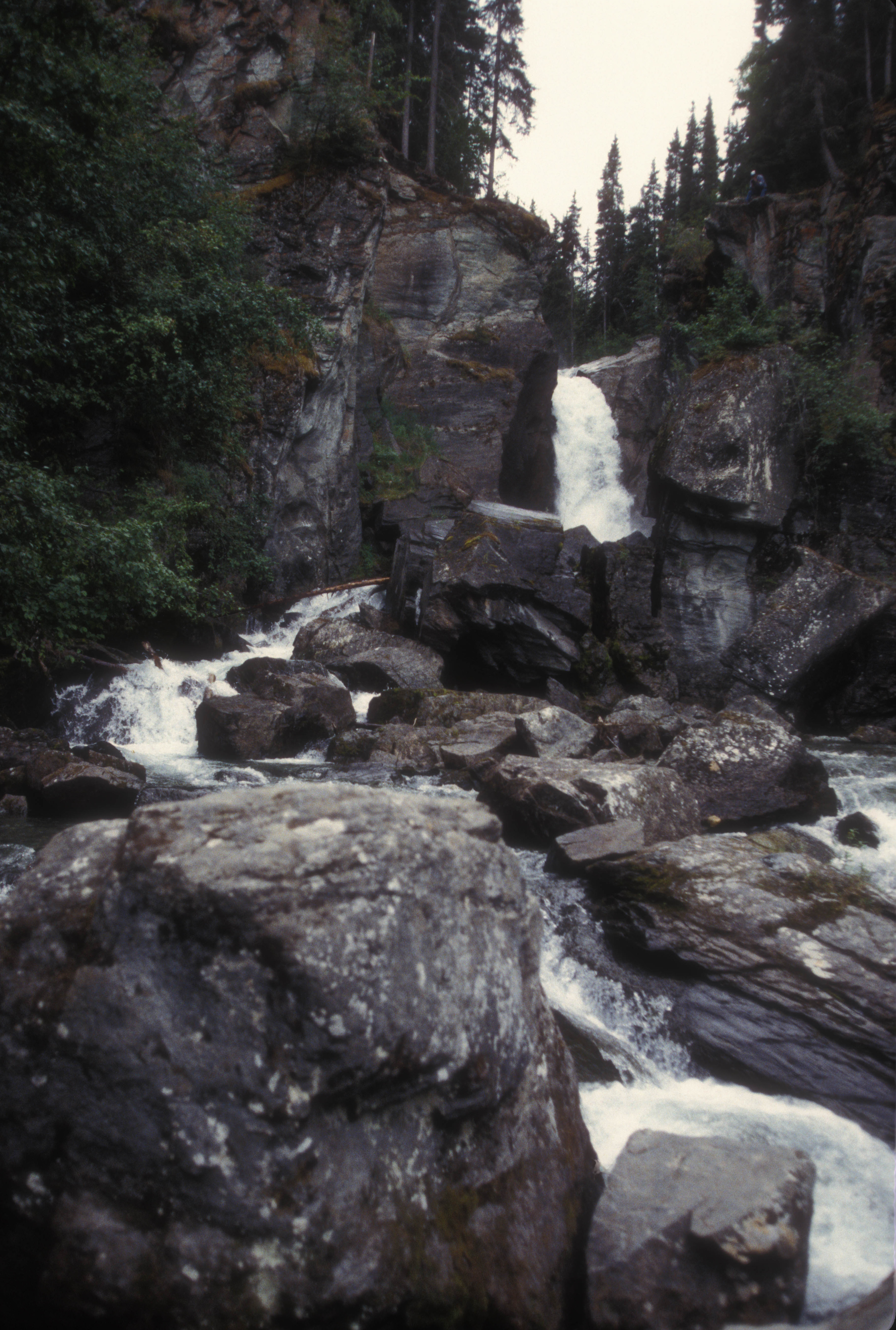
The falls at Liberty Falls State Recreational Area

According to the U.S. Census Bureau, the census area had a total area of 40,340 square miles (104,500 km^{2}), of which 34,240 square miles (88,700 km^{2}) was land and 6,100 square miles (16,000 km^{2}) (15.1%) was water.

=== Adjacent boroughs and census areas ===
- Southeast Fairbanks Census Area, Alaska – north
- Yakutat City and Borough, Alaska – southeast
- Kenai Peninsula Borough, Alaska – west
- Municipality of Anchorage, Alaska – west
- Matanuska-Susitna Borough, Alaska – west
- Yukon Territory, Canada – east

=== National protected areas ===
- Alaska Maritime National Wildlife Refuge (part of Gulf of Alaska unit)
  - Middleton Island
- Chugach National Forest (part)
- Tetlin National Wildlife Refuge (part)
- Wrangell-St. Elias National Park and Preserve (part)
  - Wrangell-Saint Elias Wilderness (part)

== Demographics ==
Historical population
Census	Pop.	Note	%±
1960	2,844		—
1970	3,098		8.9%
1980	8,348		169.5%
1990	9,952		19.2%
2000	10,195		2.4%
2010	9,636		−5.5%
2019 (est.)	9,202		−4.5%
U.S. Decennial Census; 1790–1960 1900–1990; 1990–2000 2010–2018

As of the census of 2000, there were 10,195 people, 3,884 households, and 2,559 families residing in the census area. The population density was less than 1 person per square mile (less than 1/km^{2}). There were 5,148 housing units at an average density of less than 1/sq mi (less than 1/km^{2}). The racial makeup of the census area was 75.90% White, 0.32% Black or African American, 13.25% Native American, 3.55% Asian, 0.26% Pacific Islander, 1.13% from other races, and 5.58% from two or more races. 2.81% of the population were Hispanic or Latino of any race. 2.33% reported speaking Spanish at home, while 2.26% speak Tagalog.

There were 3,884 households, out of which 37.30% had children under the age of 18 living with them, 52.10% were married couples living together, 8.50% had a female householder with no husband present, and 34.10% were non-families. 27.00% of all households were made up of individuals, and 4.90% had someone living alone who was 65 years of age or older. The average household size was 2.58 and the average family size was 3.18.

In the census area, the population was spread out, with 29.60% under the age of 18, 7.00% from 18 to 24, 30.90% from 25 to 44, 26.50% from 45 to 64, and 6.00% who were 65 years of age or older. The median age was 36 years. For every 100 females, there were 113.90 males. For every 100 females age 18 and over, there were 115.90 males.

== Politics ==
United States presidential election results for Valdez-Cordova Census Area, Alaska
Year	Republican		Democratic		Third party(ies)	
Year	No.	%	No.	%	No.	%
1960	693	48.77%	728	51.23%	0	0.00%
1964	495	33.33%	990	66.67%	0	0.00%
1968	878	48.91%	635	35.38%	282	15.71%
1972	1,075	56.31%	561	29.39%	273	14.30%
1976	1,572	56.89%	989	35.79%	202	7.31%
1980	2,198	61.11%	658	18.29%	741	20.60%
1984	2,880	73.10%	934	23.71%	126	3.20%
1988	2,245	63.19%	1,162	32.70%	146	4.11%
1992	1,975	39.29%	1,302	25.90%	1,750	34.81%
1996	2,213	49.29%	1,244	27.71%	1,033	23.01%
2000	3,209	63.29%	1,090	21.50%	771	15.21%
2004	2,339	64.19%	1,152	31.61%	153	4.20%
2008	3,322	65.01%	1,630	31.90%	158	3.09%
2012	2,523	58.08%	1,577	36.30%	244	5.62%
2016	2,560	57.09%	1,269	28.30%	655	14.61%

== Communities ==
=== Cities ===
- Cordova
- Valdez
- Whittier

=== Census-designated places ===
- Chenega
- Chisana
- Chistochina
- Chitina
- Copper Center
- Gakona
- Glennallen
- Gulkana
- Kenny Lake
- McCarthy
- Mendeltna
- Mentasta Lake
- Nabesna
- Nelchina
- Paxson
- Silver Springs
- Slana
- Tatitlek
- Tazlina
- Tolsona
- Tonsina
- Willow Creek

=== Other places ===
- Copperville (former CDP)
- Eyak (within Cordova)

== See also ==
- List of airports in the Valdez–Cordova Census Area
