= Nelchina, Alaska =

Nelchina Xaz Ghae Na’
- CDP
- Location within the state of Alaska
- Coordinates: 61°59′24″N 146°46′43.8″W
- Country: United States
- State: Alaska
- Census Area: Copper River

Government
  - State senator: Click Bishop (R)
  - State rep.: Mike Cronk (R)

Area
  - Total: 47.90 sq mi (124.05 km^{2})
  - Land: 47.39 sq mi (122.75 km^{2})
  - Water: 0.50 sq mi (1.30 km^{2})
- Elevation: 2,402 ft (732 m)

Population (2020)
  - Total: 45
  - Density: 0.96/sq mi (0.37/km^{2})
- Time zone: UTC-9 (Alaska (AKST))
  - Summer (DST): UTC-8 (AKDT)
- ZIP Code: 99588
- Area code: 907
- FIPS code: 02-52915
- GNIS feature ID: 1865559

Nelchina (Ahtena: Xaz Ghae Na’) is a census-designated place (CDP) in Copper River Census Area, Alaska, United States. The population was 46 at the 2020 census, down from 59 in 2010.

== Geography ==
Nelchina appears on the Valdez D-8 on the United States Geological Survey Map. The elevation is 2,402 feet. Nelchina is located north of the Nelchina River, and southeast of the Nelchina Public Use Area, between Milepost 137.5 and 150.5 of the Glenn Highway, at the junction of the Little Nelchina River and Crooked Creek. It is about 30 miles west of Glennallen and Mendeltna, just east of Mat-Su Borough Boundary. Nelchina is located at the Chitina Recording District.

According to the United States Census Bureau, the CDP has a total area of 46.7 square miles (121 km^{2}), of which, 46.0 square miles (119 km^{2}) of it is land and 0.7 square miles (1.8 km^{2}) of it (1.48%) is water.

== Climate ==
Nelchina is located in the subarctic climate zone. Snowshoe Lake is a weather station located nearby at an elevation of 2,312 ft (705 m). Temperature extremes range from −63 °F (−53 °C) to 95 °F (35 °C). Snowfall averages 46 inches (120 cm), with total precipitation of 11 inches (28 cm) per year.

Climate data for Snowshoe Lake, Alaska, 1981–2010 normals, 1963–2011 extremes: 2312ft (705m)
Month	Jan	Feb	Mar	Apr	May	Jun	Jul	Aug	Sep	Oct	Nov	Dec	Year
Record high °F (°C)	40 (4)	43 (6)	57 (14)	65 (18)	77 (25)	95 (35)	86 (30)	88 (31)	74 (23)	63 (17)	44 (7)	52 (11)	95 (35)
Mean maximum °F (°C)	26.2 (−3.2)	32.8 (0.4)	41.8 (5.4)	52.8 (11.6)	66.2 (19.0)	77.6 (25.3)	77.8 (25.4)	74.4 (23.6)	63.3 (17.4)	49.7 (9.8)	32.6 (0.3)	31.6 (−0.2)	80.8 (27.1)
Mean daily maximum °F (°C)	3.7 (−15.7)	14.4 (−9.8)	26.1 (−3.3)	39.3 (4.1)	52.9 (11.6)	62.3 (16.8)	65.8 (18.8)	61.1 (16.2)	50.2 (10.1)	33.0 (0.6)	13.9 (−10.1)	5.1 (−14.9)	35.7 (2.0)
Daily mean °F (°C)	−9.3 (−22.9)	−1.3 (−18.5)	6.8 (−14.0)	23.0 (−5.0)	39.3 (4.1)	48.4 (9.1)	51.9 (11.1)	47.6 (8.7)	37.2 (2.9)	21.6 (−5.8)	2.4 (−16.4)	−4.9 (−20.5)	21.9 (−5.6)
Mean daily minimum °F (°C)	−22.3 (−30.2)	−16.9 (−27.2)	−12.6 (−24.8)	6.7 (−14.1)	25.7 (−3.5)	34.5 (1.4)	38.1 (3.4)	34.1 (1.2)	24.2 (−4.3)	10.2 (−12.1)	−9.0 (−22.8)	−15.0 (−26.1)	8.1 (−13.3)
Mean minimum °F (°C)	−42.0 (−41.1)	−39.7 (−39.8)	−32.4 (−35.8)	−17.3 (−27.4)	15.0 (−9.4)	24.5 (−4.2)	28.2 (−2.1)	22.9 (−5.1)	8.0 (−13.3)	−11.2 (−24.0)	−30.1 (−34.5)	−37.3 (−38.5)	−48.4 (−44.7)
Record low °F (°C)	−60 (−51)	−56 (−49)	−53 (−47)	−30 (−34)	−10 (−23)	19 (−7)	23 (−5)	12 (−11)	−13 (−25)	−29 (−34)	−50 (−46)	−63 (−53)	−63 (−53)
Average precipitation inches (mm)	0.40 (10)	0.28 (7.1)	0.41 (10)	0.18 (4.6)	0.51 (13)	1.93 (49)	2.18 (55)	1.43 (36)	1.15 (29)	0.85 (22)	0.70 (18)	0.96 (24)	10.98 (277.7)
Average snowfall inches (cm)	6.2 (16)	4.6 (12)	3.9 (9.9)	2.2 (5.6)	1.6 (4.1)	0.0 (0.0)	0.0 (0.0)	0.0 (0.0)	1.3 (3.3)	6.2 (16)	8.4 (21)	11.9 (30)	46.3 (117.9)
Average precipitation days (≥ 0.01 in)	5.4	4.9	3.1	1.9	4.0	9.4	10.5	9.1	6.6	6.2	6.0	6.7	73.8
Average snowy days (≥ 0.1 in)	5.9	5.1	3.2	1.8	1.0	0.0	0.0	0.0	0.8	4.5	6.0	7.2	35.5
Source 1: NOAA
Source 2: XMACIS2 (records & 1981-2005 monthly maxima/minima)

== History ==
Nelchina is an Ahtna Athabascan name. Gold in the creeks draining from the Chugach Mountains brought prospectors to this area in the late 1800s. The Nelchina area offered several trails into the mountains. Nelchina was a mining settlement established in 1913. It was first reported by Theodore Chaplin in a 1915 USGS publication.

== Demographics ==
Historical population
Census	Pop.	Note	%±
2000	71		—
2010	59		−16.9%
2020	45		−23.7%
U.S. Decennial Census

Nelchina first appeared on the 2000 U.S. Census as a census-designated place (CDP).

As of the census of 2000, there were 71 people, 27 households, and 20 families residing in the CDP. The population density was 1.5 inhabitants per square mile (0.58/km^{2}). There were 33 housing units at an average density of 0.7 per square mile (0.27/km^{2}). The racial makeup of the CDP was 90.14% White, 4.23% Native American, and 5.63% from two or more races.

Of the 27 households, 25.9% had children under the age of 18 living with them, 66.7% were married couples living together, and 25.9% were non-families. 25.9% of all households were made up of individuals, and 3.7% had someone living alone who was 65 years of age or older. The average household size was 2.63 and the average family size was 3.15.

In the CDP, the age distribution of the population shows 28.2% under the age of 18, 5.6% from 18 to 24, 19.7% from 25 to 44, 32.4% from 45 to 64, and 14.1% who were 65 years of age or older. The median age was 43 years. For every 100 females, there were 153.6 males. For every 100 females age 18 and over, there were 131.8 males.

The median income for a household in the CDP was $40,625, and the median income for a family was $40,625. Males had a median income of $37,917 versus $18,750 for females. The per capita income for the CDP was $10,742. There were 19.0% of families and 17.8% of the population living below the poverty line, including 10.0% of under eighteens and none of those over 64.

== Education ==
The Copper River School District previously operated the Lottie Sparks School in Nelchina.
