= New Allakaket, Alaska =

- CDP
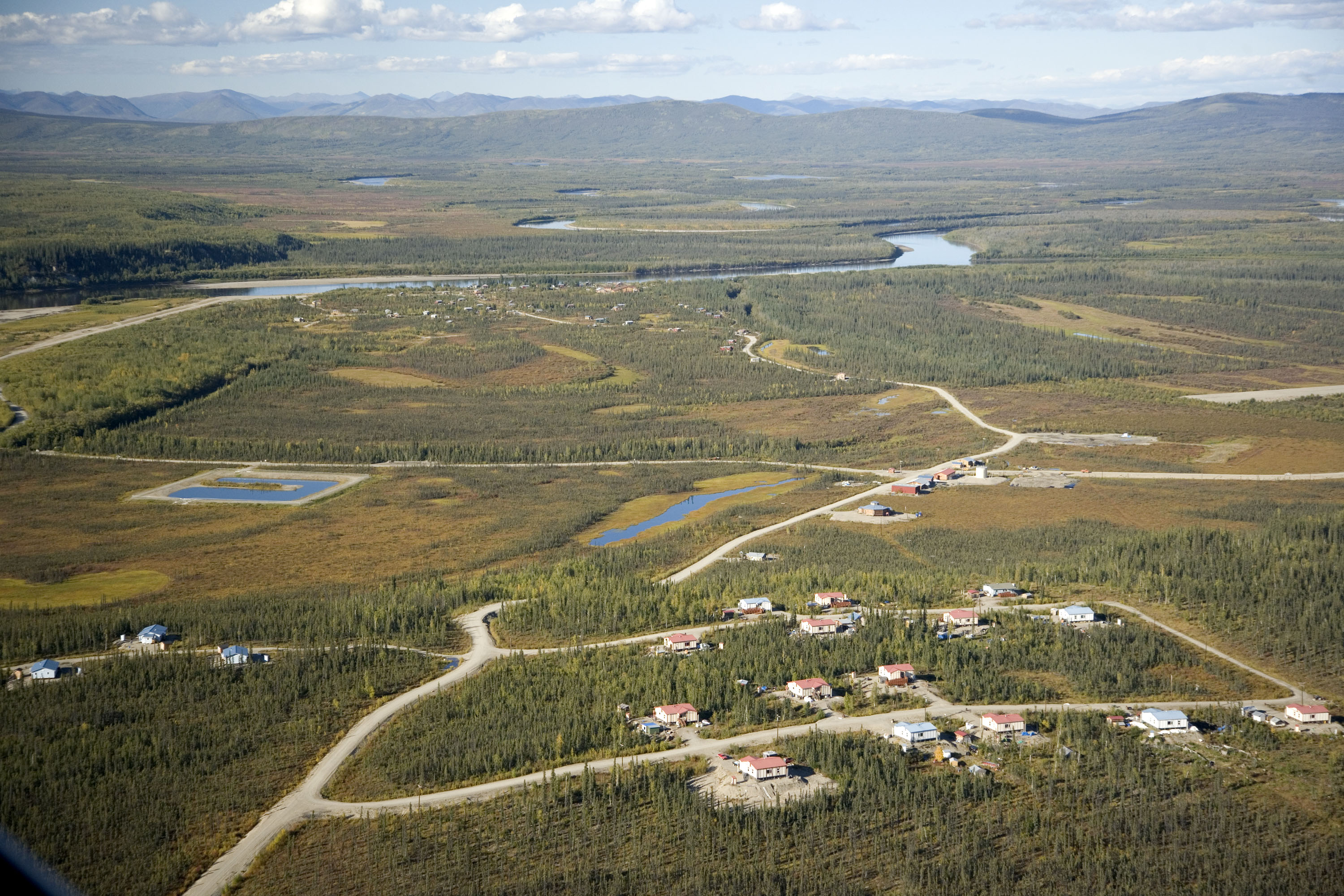
- Aerial view of New Allakaket

- Location within the state of Alaska
- Coordinates: 66°33′4″N 152°39′6″W
- Country: United States
- State: Alaska
- Census Area: Yukon-Koyukuk

Government
  - State senator: Click Bishop (R)
  - State rep.: Mike Cronk (R)

Area
  - Total: 2.7 sq mi (7.1 km^{2})
  - Land: 2.2 sq mi (5.8 km^{2})
  - Water: 0.50 sq mi (1.3 km^{2})

Population (2010)
  - Total: 66
  - Density: 16/sq mi (6.2/km^{2})
- Area code: 907
- FIPS code: 02-53162

New Allakaket was a census-designated place (CDP) in Yukon-Koyukuk Census Area, Alaska, United States. The population was 66 at the 2010 census, up from 36 in 2000. In March 2015, neighboring Allakaket annexed New Allakaket.

== Geography ==
New Allakaket is located at 66°33′4″N 152°39′6″W (66.551163, -152.651759).

According to the United States Census Bureau, the CDP had a total area of 2.7 square miles (7.0 km^{2}), of which, 2.2 square miles (5.7 km^{2}) of it is land and 0.5 square miles (1.3 km^{2}) of it was water. The total area was 18.32% water.

== Demographics ==
Historical population
Census	Pop.	Note	%±
2000	36		—
2010	66		83.3%
U.S. Decennial Census

New Allakaket first reported on the 2000 U.S. Census as a census-designated place (CDP). In 2015, it was annexed into neighboring Allakaket.

As of the census of 2000, there were 36 people, 8 households, and 7 families residing in the CDP. The population density was 16.1 inhabitants per square mile (6.2/km^{2}). There were 9 housing units at an average density of 4.0 per square mile (1.5/km^{2}). The racial makeup of the CDP was 100.00% Native American.

There were 8 households, out of which 75.0% had children under the age of 18 living with them, 75.0% were married couples living together, 0.0% had a female householder with no husband present, and 12.5% were non-families. No households were made up of individuals, and 0.0% had someone living alone who was 65 years of age or older. The average household size was 4.50 and the average family size was 4.57.

In the town the population was spread out, with 44.4% under the age of 18, 8.3% from 18 to 24, 22.2% from 25 to 44, 19.4% from 45 to 64, and 5.6% who were 65 years of age or older. The median age was 23 years. For every 100 females, there were 125.0 males. For every 100 females age 18 and over, there were 100.0 males.

The median income for a household in the town was $30,625, and the median income for a family was $30,625. The per capita income for the CDP was $5,576. 23.5% of the population and 42.9% of families were below the poverty line. Out of the total population, 26.3% of those under the age of 18 and none of those 65 and older were living below the poverty line.
