= Four Mile Road, Alaska =

- CDP
- Location within the state of Alaska
- Coordinates: 64°35′47″N 149°7′32″W
- Country: United States
- State: Alaska
- Census Area: Yukon-Koyukuk

Government
  - State senator: Click Bishop (R)
  - State rep.: Mike Cronk (R)

Area
  - Total: 1.16 sq mi (3.01 km^{2})
  - Land: 1.15 sq mi (2.99 km^{2})
  - Water: 0.0077 sq mi (0.02 km^{2})

Population (2020)
  - Total: 18
  - Density: 15.6/sq mi (6.01/km^{2})
- Time zone: UTC-9 (Alaska (AKST))
  - Summer (DST): UTC-8 (AKDT)
- ZIP code: 99760
- Area code: 907
- FIPS code: 02-26835

Four Mile Road is a census-designated place (CDP) in Yukon-Koyukuk Census Area, Alaska, United States. As of the 2020 census, Four Mile Road had a population of 18.

== Geography ==
Four Mile Road is located at 64°35′47″N 149°7′32″W (64.596324, -149.125480). It is located next to George Parks Highway or you can get there by the Nenana Municipal Airport in Nenana down South.

According to the United States Census Bureau, the CDP has a total area of 0.9 square miles (2.3 km^{2}), of which, 0.9 square miles (2.3 km^{2}) of it is land and 1.10% is water.

To the right of the city, there is the Nenana River.

== Demographics ==
Historical population
Census	Pop.	Note	%±
2000	38		—
2010	43		13.2%
2020	18		−58.1%
U.S. Decennial Census

Four Mile Road first appeared on the 2000 U.S. Census as a census-designated place (CDP).

As of the census of 2000, there were 38 people, 16 households, and 10 families residing in the CDP. The population density was 42.0 inhabitants per square mile (16.2/km^{2}). There were 19 housing units at an average density of 21.0 per square mile (8.1/km^{2}). The racial makeup of the CDP was 73.68% White and 26.32% Native American.

There were 16 households, out of which 31.3% had children under the age of 18 living with them, 50.0% were married couples living together, 6.3% had a female householder with no husband present, and 37.5% were non-families. 37.5% of all households were made up of individuals, and none had someone living alone who was 65 years of age or older. The average household size was 2.38 and the average family size was 3.20.

In the CDP, the population was spread out, with 31.6% under the age of 18, 5.3% from 18 to 24, 34.2% from 25 to 44, 23.7% from 45 to 64, and 5.3% who were 65 years of age or older. The median age was 30 years. For every 100 females, there were 111.1 males. For every 100 females age 18 and over, there were 136.4 males.

The median income for a household in the CDP was $53,125, and the median income for a family was $66,250. Males had a median income of $27,083 versus $8,000 for females. The per capita income for the CDP was $28,465. None of the population and none of the families were below the poverty line.
