= Copper Center, Alaska =

Copper Center Tl’aticae’e
- CDP
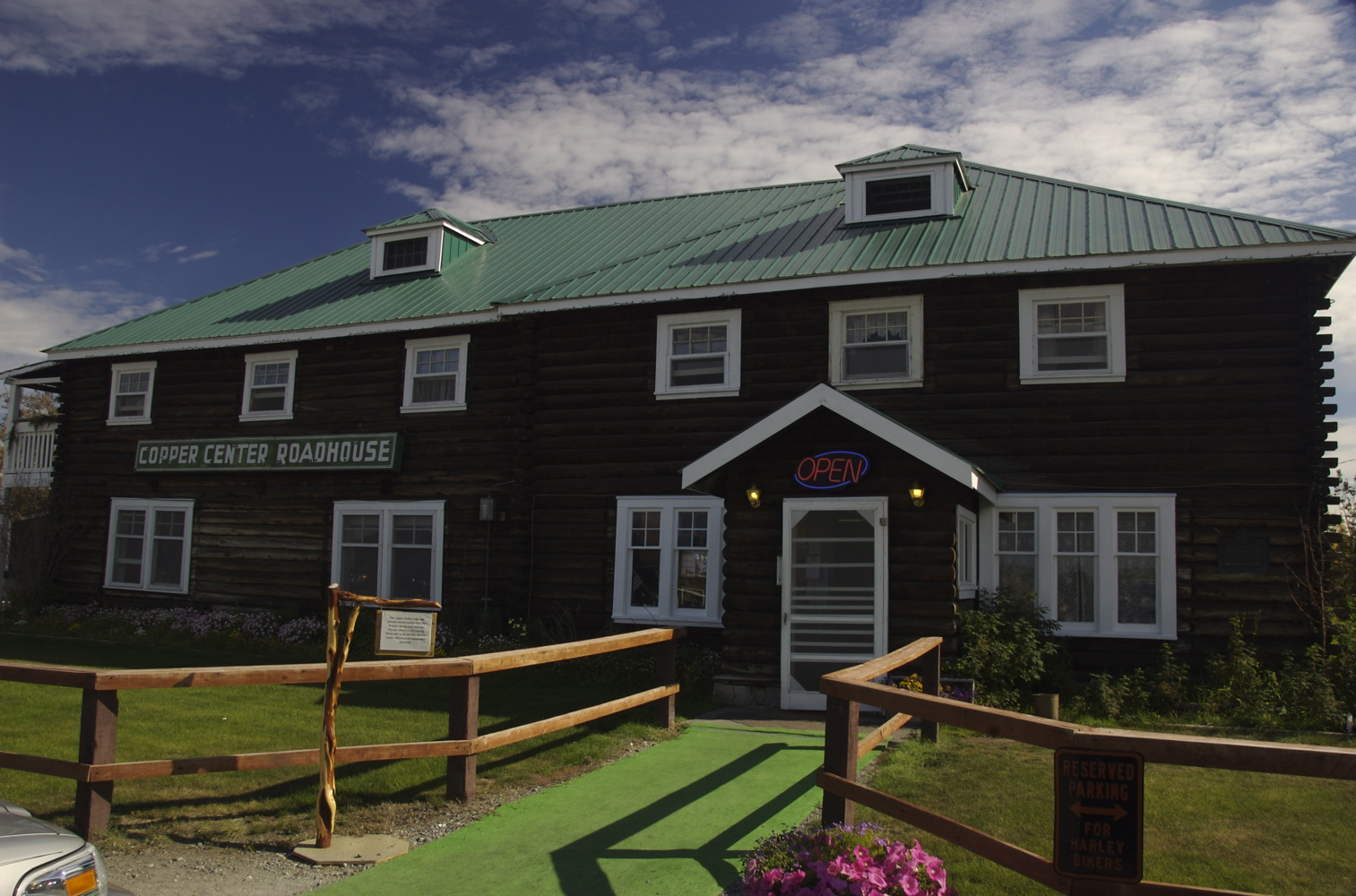
- Historic Copper Center Roadhouse on the loop through Copper Center

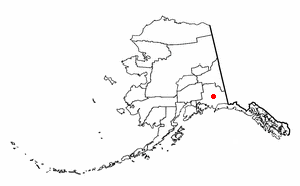
- Location of Copper Center, Alaska
- Coordinates: 61°57′55″N 145°19′6″W
- Country: United States
- State: Alaska
- Census Area: Copper River

Government
  - State senator: Click Bishop (R)
  - State rep.: Mike Cronk (R)

Area
  - Total: 12.51 sq mi (32.39 km^{2})
  - Land: 12.49 sq mi (32.36 km^{2})
  - Water: 0.012 sq mi (0.03 km^{2})

Population (2020)
  - Total: 338
  - Density: 27.0/sq mi (10.44/km^{2})
- Time zone: UTC-9 (Alaska (AKST))
  - Summer (DST): UTC-8 (AKDT)
- ZIP code: 99573
- Area code: 907
- FIPS code: 02-17300

Copper Center (Tl’aticae’e in Ahtna) is a census-designated place (CDP) on the Copper River in Copper River Census Area, Alaska, United States. By road, it is 196 miles (315 km) northeast of Anchorage. At the 2020 census the population was 338, up from 328 in 2000.

== History ==
Copper Center developed where the Valdez Glacier trail reached the Copper River. Andrew Holman was its first resident, establishing a temporary roadhouse near the site in July 1898 to provide shelter for prospectors on their way to the Klondike. He initially erected two tents: one served as Hotel Holman and the other as a makeshift post office. By winter 1899, Holman had replaced his tents with a substantial cabin. Leaving Dick Worthman to run the roadhouse, Holman pioneered the first mail route from Valdez to Eagle.

During the height of the Klondike stampede prospectors set up tent camps along both the Copper and Klutina rivers, but the first cabins were built on a site one half mile west of the Copper. Another camp sprang up at what was called Copper Ferry, where a ferry crossed the river. The area got a boost as a goldfield service center in June 1898, when B. F. Millard brushed a trail from there to the mouth of the Slana River via the foothills of Mt. Drum.

The east bank site of Old Copper Center apparently was settled in 1901 1902 by prospectors intent on investigating mineral prospects on that side of the river. Its days as a mining center were short lived, but it did draw a Native population and existed for many years as a village.

Copper Center rapidly became the primary supply center for prospectors and travelers in the Copper River basin. A telegraph station and the trail's first official post office opened in 1901, with Ringwald Blix serving as the community's first postmaster. The next year, John McCrary staked a homestead about a mile north of the Klutina River crossing. Before long, McCrary opened a hotel as well, the first frame roadhouse between Valdez and Fairbanks. Much of McCrary's property remains in the family's hands.

By 1910 American settlers had established over fifty homesteads in the vicinity. The community now received tri-weekly mail delivery in the winter and weekly service in the summer. It also contained the only telegraph station between Valdez and Fairbanks where money could be sent or received by wire.

Florence "Ma" Barnes acquired Hotel Holman in 1922, and renamed it the Copper Center Roadhouse and Trading Post. The original building burned in 1932 and was replaced by the southernmost portion of the current one. When Barnes died in 1948, she left her entire estate to a Valdez orphanage. Later that year, it sold George Ashby the property. Although Ashby died in 1979, his family continued to operate the roadhouse. The replacement roadhouse itself burned on May 20, 2012. The family says they intend to rebuild.

== Geography ==
Copper Center is located at 61°57′55″N 145°19′6″W (61.965305, -145.318280), on the Richardson Highway (Alaska Route 4), on the west bank of the Copper River, at the confluence with the Klutina River. It is about 16 miles southeast of Glennallen, which is on the Glenn Highway (part of Alaska Route 1) just west of Route 4. Copper Center is about 100 miles north of Valdez.

According to the United States Census Bureau, the CDP has a total area of 13.7 square miles (35 km^{2}), all of it land.

== Climate ==
Copper Center has a dry-summer subarctic climate (Köppen climate classification: Dsc). Proximity to the ocean allows moderated temperatures enough that record lows aren't all that extreme, save for December, January, and February. While there is minimal seasonal lag when it comes to averages, it is present with regard to record temperatures. November's record low is especially mild.

Climate data for Copper Center
Month	Jan	Feb	Mar	Apr	May	Jun	Jul	Aug	Sep	Oct	Nov	Dec	Year
Record high °F (°C)	45 (7)	48 (9)	58 (14)	70 (21)	78 (26)	92 (33)	89 (32)	94 (34)	84 (29)	60 (16)	49 (9)	44 (7)	94 (34)
Mean daily maximum °F (°C)	−4.7 (−20.4)	13.4 (−10.3)	32.5 (0.3)	45.6 (7.6)	60.8 (16.0)	70.3 (21.3)	77.4 (25.2)	65 (18)	59.2 (15.1)	30.4 (−0.9)	12.7 (−10.7)	−10.3 (−23.5)	37.7 (3.1)
Daily mean °F (°C)	−15.7 (−26.5)	−3.3 (−19.6)	17.7 (−7.9)	33.9 (1.1)	45.5 (7.5)	56.9 (13.8)	61.1 (16.2)	51.3 (10.7)	43.9 (6.6)	22.2 (−5.4)	5.1 (−14.9)	−17.8 (−27.7)	25.1 (−3.8)
Mean daily minimum °F (°C)	−26.7 (−32.6)	−20 (−29)	2.8 (−16.2)	22.2 (−5.4)	30.1 (−1.1)	43.5 (6.4)	44.7 (7.1)	37.5 (3.1)	28.5 (−1.9)	14 (−10)	−2.6 (−19.2)	−25.4 (−31.9)	12.4 (−10.9)
Record low °F (°C)	−60 (−51)	−57 (−49)	−43 (−42)	−30 (−34)	12 (−11)	24 (−4)	32 (0)	21 (−6)	6 (−14)	−23 (−31)	−32 (−36)	−57 (−49)	−60 (−51)
Average rainfall inches (mm)	0.69 (18)	0.57 (14)	0.46 (12)	0.19 (4.8)	0.63 (16)	1.68 (43)	2 (51)	1.45 (37)	0.89 (23)	0.89 (23)	1.34 (34)	1.61 (41)	12.4 (316.8)
Average snowfall inches (cm)	9.9 (25)	3.8 (9.7)	4.2 (11)	1 (2.5)	0 (0)	0 (0)	0 (0)	0 (0)	0 (0)	2.6 (6.6)	10 (25)	8 (20)	39.5 (99.8)
Average precipitation days	3	2	3	1	4	7	9	6	5	5	5	5	55
Source: WRCC

== Demographics ==
Historical population
Census	Pop.	Note	%±
1910	91		—
1920	71		−22.0%
1930	80		12.7%
1940	138		72.5%
1950	90		−34.8%
1960	151		67.8%
1970	206		36.4%
1980	213		3.4%
1990	449		110.8%
2000	362		−19.4%
2010	328		−9.4%
2020	338		3.0%
U.S. Decennial Census

Copper Center first appeared on the 1910 U.S. Census as an unincorporated village. In 1980 it was made a census-designated place (CDP).

As of the census of 2000, there were 362 people, 132 households, and 88 families residing in the CDP. The population density was 26.4 inhabitants per square mile (10.2/km^{2}). There were 163 housing units at an average density of 11.9 per square mile (4.6/km^{2}). The racial makeup of the CDP was 48.07% White, 0.28% Black or African American, 46.69% Native American, and 4.97% from two or more races. 0.83% of the population were Hispanic or Latino of any race.

Of the 132 households, 40.2% had children under the age of 18 living with them, 37.1% were married couples living together, 19.7% had a female householder with no husband present, and 33.3% were non-families. 28.8% of all households were made up of individuals, and 7.6% had someone living alone who was 65 years of age or older. The average household size was 2.74 and the average family size was 3.39.

In the CDP, the population was spread out, with 38.7% under the age of 18, 7.2% from 18 to 24, 22.7% from 25 to 44, 23.2% from 45 to 64, and 8.3% who were 65 years of age or older. The median age was 31 years. For every 100 females, there were 106.9 males. For every 100 females age 18 and over, there were 109.4 males.

The median income for a household in the CDP was $32,188, and the median income for a family was $42,500. Males had a median income of $46,250 versus $22,083 for females. The per capita income for the CDP was $15,152. About 18.5% of families and 18.8% of the population were below the poverty line, including 23.1% of those under age 18 and 6.9% of those age 65 or over.

== Education ==
Public education in the area is provided by Kenny Lake School of the Copper River School District.
