= Staten Island (Aleutian Islands) =

Island in Alaska

Aleut: Iluuĝix̂ Tanax̂
- Interactive map of Staten Island

Geography
- Location: Bering Sea
- Coordinates: 51°47′47″N 176°47′01″W
- Archipelago: Andreanof Islands
- Area: 0.98 km^{2} (0.38 sq mi)
- Highest elevation: 60 m (200 ft)

Administration
- United States
- State: Alaska
- Borough: Unorganized Borough
- Census Area: Aleutians West Census Area

Demographics
- Population: 0

Staten Island (Aleut: Iluuĝix̂ Tanax̂, lit. 'Inner Island') is a small uninhabited island in the Andreanof Islands, a group of the Aleutian Islands in the state of Alaska. It is in the Bering Sea, west of Adak Island. Staten Island is part of the Aleutian Islands Wilderness in the Alaska Maritime National Wildlife Refuge. It has an area of 0.98 square kilometers (0.38 sq mi) and has a maximum height of 60 meters (197 ft).

This island was named for Staten Island, and it was given this name by the United States Navy during a 1934 expedition.
