= Klutina River =

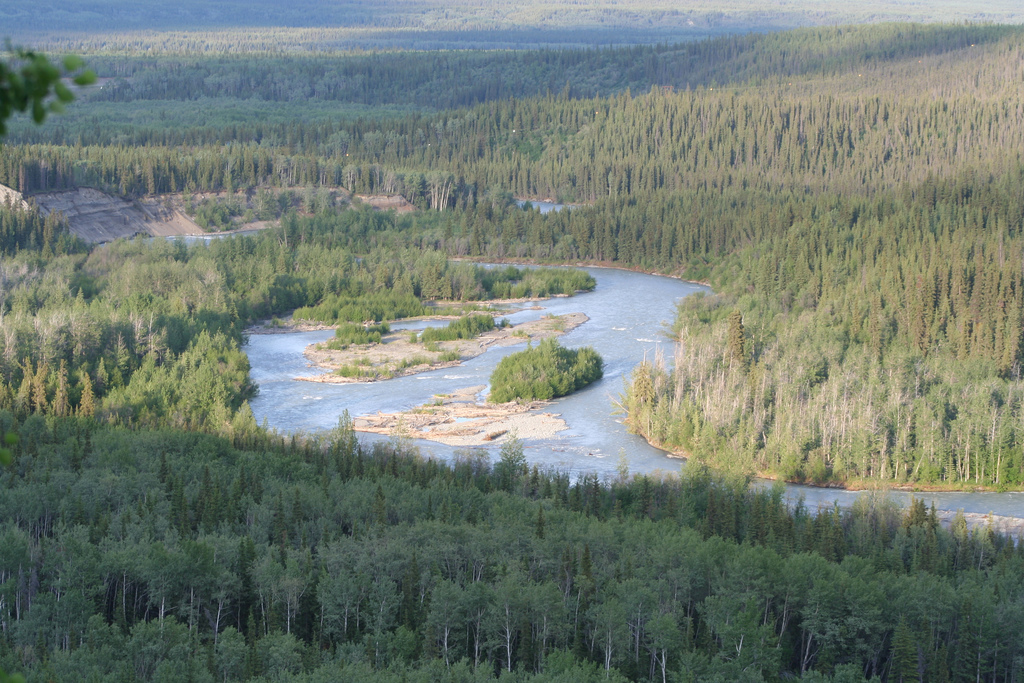
- Klutina River

- Location of the mouth of the Klutina River in Alaska

Location
- Country: United States
- State: Alaska
- Census Area: Copper River

Physical characteristics
- Source: Klutina Glacier
  - location: Chugach Mountains
  - coordinates: 61°23′54″N 146°07′33″W
  - elevation: 2,287 ft (697 m)
- Mouth: Copper River
  - location: Copper Center
  - coordinates: 61°57′19″N 145°17′09″W
  - elevation: 961 ft (293 m)
- Length: 63 mi (101 km)

The Klutina River (Tl’atii Na’ in Ahtna) is a 63-mile (101 km) tributary of the Copper River in the U.S. state of Alaska. Beginning at Klutina Glacier in the Chugach Mountains, the river flows generally northeast, passing through Klutina Lake, to meet the larger river at the community of Copper Center. The river mouth is 66 miles (106 km) northeast of Valdez.

== Fishing ==
Accessible from the Richardson Highway, which passes through Copper Center, the Klutina River and its tributaries are a major fishery for sockeye salmon and trophy-sized king salmon, the latter sometimes weighing between 50 and 90 pounds (23 and 41 kg). Floatplanes and jet boats, trails, and an unimproved four-wheel-drive road between Copper Center and Klutina Lake provide additional access to game fish in the watershed. In addition to salmon, the main species are Dolly Varden and Arctic grayling.

== See also ==
- List of rivers of Alaska
