= List of places in Alaska (V) =

This list of cities, towns, unincorporated communities, counties, and other recognized places in the U.S. state of Alaska also includes information on the number and names of counties in which the place lies, and its lower and upper zip code bounds, if applicable.

Name of place	Number of counties	Principal county	Lower zip code	Upper zip code
Valdez	1	Valdez-Cordova Census Area	99686	
Valdez City School District	1	Valdez-Cordova Census Area		
Vanderbilt Hill	1	City and Borough of Juneau		
Vank Island	1	Wrangell-Petersburg Census Area	99929	
Venetie	1	Yukon-Koyukuk Census Area	99781	
Venetie Landing	1	Yukon-Koyukuk Census Area		
Village Island	1	Kodiak Island Borough		
