= Kenny Lake, Alaska =

- CDP
- Location within the state of Alaska
- Coordinates: 61°42′12″N 144°53′48″W
- Country: United States
- State: Alaska
- Census Area: Copper River

Government
  - State senator: Click Bishop (R)
  - State rep.: Mike Cronk (R)

Area
  - Total: 194.58 sq mi (503.96 km^{2})
  - Land: 194.50 sq mi (503.76 km^{2})
  - Water: 0.077 sq mi (0.20 km^{2})
- Elevation: 1,211 ft (369 m)

Population (2020)
  - Total: 234
  - Density: 1.2/sq mi (0.46/km^{2})
- Time zone: UTC-9 (Alaska (AKST))
  - Summer (DST): UTC-8 (AKDT)
- Area code: 907
- FIPS code: 02-38910
- GNIS feature ID: 1866955

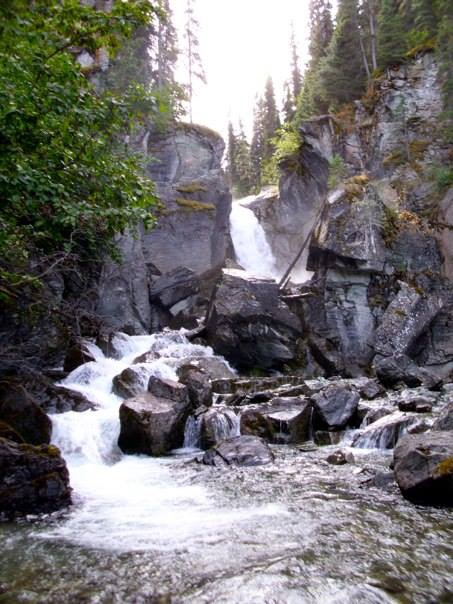
Liberty Falls, Copper River Basin, Alaska

Kenny Lake is a farming community - one of the last to be homesteaded in America. Kenny Lake is a census-designated place (CDP) in the Copper River Census Area, Alaska, United States. At the 2020 census the population was 234, down from 355 in 2010.

== Geography ==
Kenny Lake is located at 61°42′12″N 144°53′48″W (61.703384, -144.896546).

According to the United States Census Bureau, the CDP has a total area of 194.58 square miles (504.0 km^{2}), of which, 194.50 square miles (503.8 km^{2}) of it is land and 0.08 square miles (0.21 km^{2}) of it (0.04%) is water.

== Demographics ==
Historical population
Census	Pop.	Note	%±
1990	423		—
2000	410		−3.1%
2010	355		−13.4%
2020	234		−34.1%
U.S. Decennial Census

Kenny Lake first appeared on the 1990 U.S. Census as a census-designated place (CDP).

As of the census of 2000, there were 410 people, 143 households, and 96 families residing in the CDP. The population density was 2.1 inhabitants per square mile (0.81/km^{2}). There were 190 housing units at an average density of 1.0 per square mile (0.39/km^{2}). The racial makeup of the CDP was 82.68% White, 10.24% Native American, 0.49% Asian, 2.68% from other races, and 3.90% from two or more races. 5.85% of the population were Hispanic or Latino of any race.

Of the 143 households, 40.6% had children under the age of 18 living with them, 57.3% were married couples living together, 4.2% had a female householder with no husband present, and 32.2% were non-families. 27.3% of all households were made up of individuals, and 9.8% had someone living alone who was 65 years of age or older. The average household size was 2.87 and the average family size was 3.52.

In the CDP, the age distribution of the population shows 32.4% under the age of 18, 6.6% from 18 to 24, 26.8% from 25 to 44, 24.6% from 45 to 64, and 9.5% who were 65 years of age or older. The median age was 36 years. For every 100 females, there were 113.5 males. For every 100 females age 18 and over, there were 116.4 males. There are also large numbers of wild geese.

Males had a median income of $40,938 versus $21,875 for females. The per capita income for the CDP was $13,121. About 22.7% of families and 25.9% of the population were below the poverty line, including 22.6% of those under age 18 and 11.8% of those age 65 or over.
