= Glennallen, Alaska =

Town in Alaska

Glennallen Ciisik’e Na’
- CDP
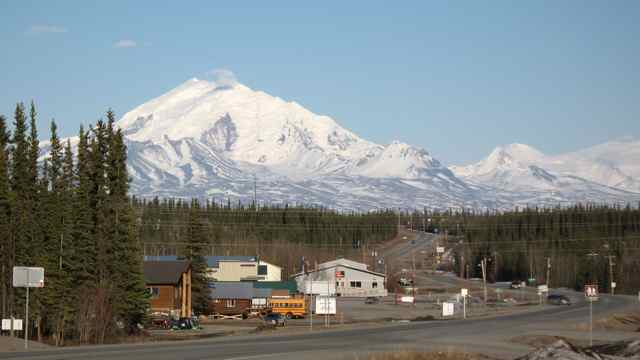
- Glennallen, with Mt. Drum and part of Mt. Wrangell in the background

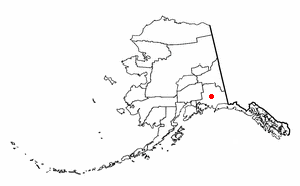
- Location of Glennallen, Alaska
- Coordinates: 62°6′35″N 145°33′26″W
- Country: United States
- State: Alaska
- Census Area: Copper River

Government
  - State senator: Click Bishop (R)
  - State rep.: Mike Cronk (R)

Area
  - Total: 115.60 sq mi (299.41 km^{2})
  - Land: 115.07 sq mi (298.04 km^{2})
  - Water: 0.53 sq mi (1.37 km^{2})
- Elevation: 1,434 ft (437 m)

Population (2020)
  - Total: 439
  - Density: 3.8/sq mi (1.47/km^{2})
- Time zone: UTC-9 (Alaska (AKST))
  - Summer (DST): UTC-8 (AKDT)
- ZIP code: 99588
- Area code: 907
- FIPS code: 02-28740
- GNIS feature ID: 1402643

Glennallen /ɡlɛˈnælən/ (Ahtena: Ciisik’e Na’) is a census-designated place (CDP) in the Copper River Census Area (Note: The Copper River Census Area was established in 2019 by the split of the former Valdez–Cordova Census Area.) in the Unorganized Borough of the U.S. state of Alaska. As of the 2020 census, the population of the CDP was 439, down from 483 in 2010. It is the most populated community in the census area.

== Geography and climate ==
=== Location ===
Glennallen is located at 62°06′33″N 145°32′47″W (62.109170, -145.54639; Sec. 23, T004N, R002W, Copper River Meridian), in the Chitina Recording District and Game Management Unit 13.

It lies along the Glenn Highway at its junction with the Richardson Highway, 189 road miles (304 km) east of Anchorage. It is just outside the western boundary of Wrangell-St. Elias National Park and Preserve.

According to the United States Census Bureau, the CDP has a total area of 114.9 square miles (298 km^{2}), of which 114.1 square miles (296 km^{2}) is land and 0.8 square miles (2.1 km^{2}), or 0.66%, is water.

=== Climate ===
Glennallen features a dry-summer subarctic climate (Köppen climate classification: Dsc) The city features bitterly cold winters and short, mildly warm summers.

Climate data for Glennallen, Alaska (1991–2020 normals, extremes 1965–present)
Month	Jan	Feb	Mar	Apr	May	Jun	Jul	Aug	Sep	Oct	Nov	Dec	Year
Record high °F (°C)	47 (8)	47 (8)	56 (13)	71 (22)	81 (27)	92 (33)	96 (36)	89 (32)	76 (24)	72 (22)	46 (8)	45 (7)	96 (36)
Mean maximum °F (°C)	34.2 (1.2)	38.2 (3.4)	44.9 (7.2)	56.8 (13.8)	73.0 (22.8)	81.9 (27.7)	83.7 (28.7)	77.8 (25.4)	67.2 (19.6)	53.3 (11.8)	36.7 (2.6)	33.9 (1.1)	86.3 (30.2)
Mean daily maximum °F (°C)	4.1 (−15.5)	15.0 (−9.4)	28.1 (−2.2)	44.7 (7.1)	58.3 (14.6)	67.2 (19.6)	69.9 (21.1)	64.7 (18.2)	54.8 (12.7)	36.5 (2.5)	14.1 (−9.9)	5.6 (−14.7)	38.6 (3.7)
Daily mean °F (°C)	−5.2 (−20.7)	3.2 (−16.0)	13.0 (−10.6)	32.0 (0.0)	44.7 (7.1)	54.1 (12.3)	57.7 (14.3)	53.2 (11.8)	43.4 (6.3)	26.1 (−3.3)	5.1 (−14.9)	−2.5 (−19.2)	27.1 (−2.7)
Mean daily minimum °F (°C)	−14.4 (−25.8)	−8.7 (−22.6)	−2.0 (−18.9)	19.3 (−7.1)	31.1 (−0.5)	41.0 (5.0)	45.5 (7.5)	41.6 (5.3)	32.0 (0.0)	15.7 (−9.1)	−3.9 (−19.9)	−10.6 (−23.7)	15.6 (−9.1)
Mean minimum °F (°C)	−41.6 (−40.9)	−34.4 (−36.9)	−25.7 (−32.1)	−0.7 (−18.2)	20.7 (−6.3)	28.5 (−1.9)	33.9 (1.1)	26.8 (−2.9)	16.4 (−8.7)	−6.2 (−21.2)	−30.3 (−34.6)	−34.1 (−36.7)	−46.4 (−43.6)
Record low °F (°C)	−61 (−52)	−60 (−51)	−50 (−46)	−30 (−34)	10 (−12)	23 (−5)	25 (−4)	16 (−9)	−5 (−21)	−30 (−34)	−55 (−48)	−56 (−49)	−61 (−52)
Average precipitation inches (mm)	0.70 (18)	0.80 (20)	0.44 (11)	0.18 (4.6)	0.71 (18)	1.48 (38)	1.74 (44)	1.83 (46)	1.41 (36)	0.85 (22)	1.19 (30)	0.79 (20)	12.12 (307.6)
Average snowfall inches (cm)	10.5 (27)	7.4 (19)	4.9 (12)	2.5 (6.4)	0.8 (2.0)	0.0 (0.0)	0.0 (0.0)	0.0 (0.0)	0.4 (1.0)	7.5 (19)	11.1 (28)	11.5 (29)	56.6 (143.4)
Average precipitation days (≥ 0.01 in)	6.6	4.9	2.9	1.6	4.2	8.5	10.6	11.1	9.2	6.2	5.6	6.3	77.7
Average snowy days (≥ 0.1 in)	7.3	5.2	3.2	1.4	0.7	0.0	0.0	0.0	0.3	4.7	6.8	8.1	37.7
Source: NOAA

== History and culture ==
In earlier times, the Ahtna Alaska Natives roamed the Copper River Valley in search of fish and game, both of which are usually plentiful there. Ahtna now live in several communities around Glennallen. In 1899, the U.S. Army built a pack trail for summer use between the port of Valdez and Eagle, which passed through the Copper River Valley. In the early 20th century, the trail was widened and became the Richardson Highway.

During World War II, the United States built a series of military bases in Alaska, primarily for the purpose of supplying aircraft and other war materiel to Russia by way of Alaska and the Russian Far East as part of the Lend-lease program. This made it difficult for the Germans to the west and the Japanese to the south of Russia to interfere with the supply operation. As part of this operation, highways were built to supply the bases. The major highway project of this effort was the Alaska Highway from Dawson Creek, British Columbia, Canada to the existing Richardson Highway at Delta Junction, Alaska and thus to Fairbanks via the Richardson Highway. Another project was the Glenn Highway, which connected Anchorage, Alaska's largest city, with the Richardson Highway, and thus with the rest of Alaska, Canada, and the then-48 United States.

Construction for the Glenn Highway began at a camp on the Richardson Highway in the Copper River Valley named Glennallen after two U.S. Army explorers of the late 19th century: Capt. Edwin Forbes Glenn and Lt. Henry T. Allen. The highway was completed in 1945. Glennallen developed as a small community around the site of the camp. It became a commercial center for motor traffic along the Glenn and Richardson highways. It is one of the few communities in the region that was not built on the site of a Native village.

During the 1950s and 1960s, another highway, the Tok Cut-Off, was constructed from a point 15 miles north of Glennallen to the community of Tok, 135 miles east on the Alaska Highway. This enhanced Glennallen as a commercial center. Also, in 1956, a Jesuit school, Copper Valley School, was opened. This facility increased the population considerably by bringing to the region a number of staff and students from Holy Cross Mission in western Alaska. In 1961 "Glenallen" was officially renamed "Glennallen" by the US Postal Service, adding the extra 'n'.

Glennallen's economy grew with the construction of the Trans-Alaska Pipeline System from 1975–1977 and the continuing service needs of the pipeline. The economy of the area was negatively impacted by the construction of the George Parks Highway, which connected Anchorage to Denali National Park and Fairbanks along the Alaska Railroad route, bypassing Glennallen.

== Demographics ==
Historical population
Census	Pop.	Note	%±
1950	142		—
1960	169		19.0%
1970	363		114.8%
1980	511		40.8%
1990	451		−11.7%
2000	554		22.8%
2010	483		−12.8%
2020	439		−9.1%
U.S. Decennial Census

Glennallen first appeared on the 1950 U.S. Census as an unincorporated village. It was made a census-designated place (CDP) in 1980.

As of the census of 2000, there were 554 people, 204 households, and 136 families residing in the CDP. The population density was 4.9 inhabitants per square mile (1.9/km^{2}). There were 269 housing units at an average density of 0.9/km^{2} (2.4/sq mi). The racial makeup of the CDP was 85.20% White, 0.18% Black or African American, 5.05% Native American or Alaska Native, 0.18% Asian, 1.44% Pacific Islander, and 7.94% from two or more races. 0.54% of the population were Hispanic or Latino of any race.

Of the 204 households, 36.8% had children under the age of 18 living with them, 56.4% were married couples living together, 6.4% had a female householder with no husband present, and 33.3% were non-families. 27.0% of all households were made up of individuals, and 5.4% had someone living alone who was 65 years of age or older. The average household size was 2.63 and the average family size was 3.31.

The age distribution was 31.8% under the age of 18, 9.6% from 18 to 24, 27.4% from 25 to 44, 26.2% from 45 to 64, and 5.1% who were 65 years of age or older. The median age was 32 years. For every 100 females, there were 106.7 males. For every 100 females age 18 and over, there were 110.0 males.

The median income for a household in the CDP was $38,846, and the median income for a family was $40,909. Males had a median income of $29,375 versus $28,125 for females. The per capita income for the CDP was $17,084. About 4.6% of families and 8.04% of the population were below the poverty line, including 12.8% of those under age 18 and 3.1% of those age 65 or over.

== Facilities, utilities, schools, and health care ==
=== Facilities and utilities ===
Many but not all year-round homes are fully plumbed. Although many residents have private wells in the Glennallen area, the water is often of poor quality. Glennallen Heights utilizes two wells to serve a piped system, and a local private business delivers water by truck to fill home water tanks. The majority of downtown is connected to a piped sewage system operated by The Glennallen Improvement Corp. The sewage system serves 52 homes and businesses, and is being expanded to the Alaska Bible College and the Glennallen Heights subdivision. Most residences have individual septic tank systems, but permafrost and high water tables cause drainage failures. Refuse collection services and the Class II permitted landfill are operated by Copper Basin Sanitation in Glennallen. Copper Valley Electric purchases power from the state-owned Solomon Gulch Hydro Facility, and owns diesel plants in Glennallen and Valdez. Electricity is provided by Copper Valley Electric Assoc.

=== Schools ===
There are two schools in the community, attended by 158 students. (Glennallen Elementary School and Glennallen High School ) The schools are part of the Copper River School District.

Prince William Sound Community College is located in Glennallen at mile 188 of the Glenn Highway.

=== Health care and emergency services ===
There are no local hospitals. However there are two health clinics, including Cross Road Medical Center and the Copper River Native Association. Both clinics provide urgent/emergency care during normal business hours.

Fire services are provided by the GlennRich Volunteer Fire Department, and paramedic-level Emergency Medical Services is provided by Copper River EMS.

Law enforcement is provided by the Alaska State Troopers who have a post in Glennallen. Emergency Services are accessed using the 911 system.

== Economy and transportation ==
=== Economy ===
Glennallen is the supply hub of the Copper River region. Local businesses serve area residents and tourism from the Glenn Highway traffic, supplies and services, schools and medical care. State highway maintenance and federal offices are in Glennallen. RV parks, lodging, fuel and other services cater to independent travelers. The National Park Service's Wrangell-St. Elias Visitor Center and the Copper River Princess Wilderness Lodge were completed in 2002 at Copper Center. Offices for the Bureau of Land Management, Alaska State Troopers, and the Department of Fish and Game are located here. There are several small farms in the area. Four residents hold commercial fishing permits. Glennallen is home to Ahtna, Incorporated.

=== Transportation ===
The Glenn/Tok Cutoff and Richardson Highways provide year-round road access to other areas of the state. Brenwick's Airport provides public air access, and scheduled services are available. The 2,070 ft (630 m) turf airstrip is owned and operated by Copper Basin District, Inc. The Gulkana Airport is located 4.3 miles (6.9 km) northeast.

== Parks ==
The 17-mile (27 km) road to Lake Louise State Recreation Area is west of Glenallen on the Glenn Highway. North of town on the Richardson Highway is the Dry Creek State Recreation Site, a 360-acre (150 ha) park with a large campground, trails, and fishing for trout. The access road is known to be rough and the area is known for mosquitos.
