= Kenny Lake School =

Coordinates: 61°41′28″N 144°50′06″W

Location
- Mile 5 Edgerton Hwy; Copper Center, Alaska 99573; United States

Information
- School district: Copper River School District
- CEEB code: 020016
- Principal: Theresa Laville
- Faculty: 6.00 (on an FTE basis)
- Enrollment: 51 (2020–21)
- Student to teacher ratio: 8.50
- Color(s): Blue and gold
- Team name: Hawks
- Website: www.crsd.us/o/copper-river-school-district/page/kenny-lake-school

Kenny Lake School is a public school in Alaska that was honored by the Blue Ribbon Schools Program in 2005. Kenny Lake serves students in grades 1 through 12 as well as preschool and early childhood education. The school is a part of the Copper River School District.
