= Copperville, Alaska =

Unincorporated community in the state of Alaska, United States

- Former Census-designated place (CDP)
- Location within the state of Alaska
- Coordinates: 62°04′19″N 145°24′53″W
- Country: United States
- State: Alaska
- Census Area: Copper River

Government
  - State senator: Click Bishop (R)
  - State rep.: Mike Cronk (R)

Area
  - Total: 1.4 sq mi (3.6 km^{2})
  - Land: 1.4 sq mi (3.6 km^{2})
  - Water: 0 sq mi (0 km^{2})
- Elevation: 1,210 ft (370 m)

Population (2000)
  - Total: 179
- Time zone: UTC-9 (Alaska (AKST))
  - Summer (DST): UTC-8 (AKDT)
- Area code: 907
- FIPS code: 02-17380
- GNIS feature ID: 1866937

Copperville is an unincorporated community and former census-designated place in the Copper River Census Area of the U.S. state of Alaska. The population was 179 at the 2000 United States census, but it was consolidated into the Tazlina CDP as of the 2010 census.

== Geography ==
Copperville is located at 62°04′19″N 145°24′53″W. According to the United States Census Bureau, the CDP has a total area of 1.4 square miles (3.6 km^{2}), all of it land.

== Demographics ==
Historical population
Census	Pop.	Note	%±
1990	163		—
2000	179		9.8%
U.S. Decennial Census

Copperville first appeared on the 1990 U.S. Census as a census-designated place (CDP). In 2010, it was merged into the neighboring Tazlina CDP.

As of the census of 2000, there were 179 people, 61 households, and 50 families residing in the CDP. The population density was 128.3 inhabitants per square mile (49.5/km^{2}). There were 77 housing units at an average density of 55.2 per square mile (21.3/km^{2}). The racial makeup of the CDP was 77.09% White, 13.97% Native American, 1.68% Asian, and 7.26% from two or more races.

There were 61 households, out of which 44.3% had children under the age of 18 living with them, 60.7% were married couples living together, 14.8% had a female householder with no husband present, and 16.4% were non-families. 16.4% of all households were made up of individuals, and 3.3% had someone living alone who was 65 years of age or older. The average household size was 2.93 and the average family size was 3.24.

In the CDP, the population was spread out, with 34.6% under the age of 18, 5.6% from 18 to 24, 28.5% from 25 to 44, 26.8% from 45 to 64, and 4.5% who were 65 years of age or older. The median age was 34 years. For every 100 females, there were 121.0 males. For every 100 females age 18 and over, there were 116.7 males.

The median income for a household in the CDP was $53,125, and the median income for a family was $49,286. Males had a median income of $46,563 versus $30,625 for females. The per capita income for the CDP was $21,733. About 11.7% of families and 7.1% of the population were below the poverty line, including 3.1% of those under the age of eighteen and none of those 65 or over.
