= Willow Creek, Alaska =

- CDP
- Location within the state of Alaska
- Coordinates: 61°47′49″N 145°11′10″W
- Country: United States
- State: Alaska
- Census Area: Copper River

Government
  - State senator: Click Bishop (R)
  - State rep.: Mike Cronk (R)

Area
  - Total: 37.91 sq mi (98.18 km^{2})
  - Land: 37.05 sq mi (95.96 km^{2})
  - Water: 0.86 sq mi (2.22 km^{2})

Population (2020)
  - Total: 190
  - Density: 5.1/sq mi (1.98/km^{2})
- Time zone: UTC-9 (Alaska (AKST))
  - Summer (DST): UTC-8 (AKDT)
- Area code: 907
- FIPS code: 02-85290
- GNIS feature ID: 1412074

Willow Creek is a census-designated place (CDP) in Copper River Census Area, Alaska, United States. At the 2020 census the population was 190, down from 191 in 2010.

== Geography ==
Willow Creek is located at 61°47′49″N 145°11′10″W (61.796917, -145.186123).

According to the United States Census Bureau, the CDP has a total area of 40.6 square miles (105 km^{2}), of which, 39.8 square miles (103 km^{2}) of it is land and 0.8 square miles (2.1 km^{2}) of it (1.95%) is water.

== Demographics ==
Historical population
Census	Pop.	Note	%±
2000	201		—
2010	191		−5.0%
2020	190		−0.5%
U.S. Decennial Census

Willow Creek first appeared on the 2000 U.S. Census as a census-designated place (CDP).

As of the census of 2000, there were 201 people, 80 households, and 52 families residing in the CDP. The population density was 5.1 inhabitants per square mile (2.0/km^{2}). There were 111 housing units at an average density of 2.8 per square mile (1.1/km^{2}). The racial makeup of the CDP was 85.07% White, 0.50% Black or African American, 5.47% Native American, 0.50% Asian, 1.00% from other races, and 7.46% from two or more races. 1.00% of the population were Hispanic or Latino of any race.

There were 80 households, out of which 33.8% had children under the age of 18 living with them, 55.0% were married couples living together, 5.0% had a female householder with no husband present, and 35.0% were non-families. 31.3% of all households were made up of individuals, and 6.3% had someone living alone who was 65 years of age or older. The average household size was 2.51 and the average family size was 3.19.

In the CDP, the age distribution of the population shows 27.9% under the age of 18, 7.0% from 18 to 24, 24.4% from 25 to 44, 28.9% from 45 to 64, and 11.9% who were 65 years of age or older. The median age was 41 years. For every 100 females, there were 113.8 males. For every 100 females age 18 and over, there were 126.6 males.

The median income for a household in the CDP was $36,563, and the median income for a family was $40,000. Males had a median income of $48,750 versus $26,250 for females. The per capita income for the CDP was $18,242. About 3.6% of families and 6.9% of the population were below the poverty line, including none of those under the age of eighteen and 7.7% of those 65 or over.
