= Tolsona, Alaska =

- CDP
- Location within the state of Alaska
- Coordinates: 62°6′0″N 146°2′26″W
- Country: United States
- State: Alaska
- Census Area: Copper River

Government
  - State senator: Click Bishop (R)
  - State rep.: Mike Cronk (R)

Area
  - Total: 46.48 sq mi (120.37 km^{2})
  - Land: 45.39 sq mi (117.57 km^{2})
  - Water: 1.08 sq mi (2.80 km^{2})
- Elevation: 2,188 ft (667 m)

Population (2020)
  - Total: 12
  - Density: 0.26/sq mi (0.1/km^{2})
- Time zone: UTC-9 (Alaska (AKST))
  - Summer (DST): UTC-8 (AKDT)
- Area code: 907
- FIPS code: 02-78297
- GNIS feature ID: 1865569

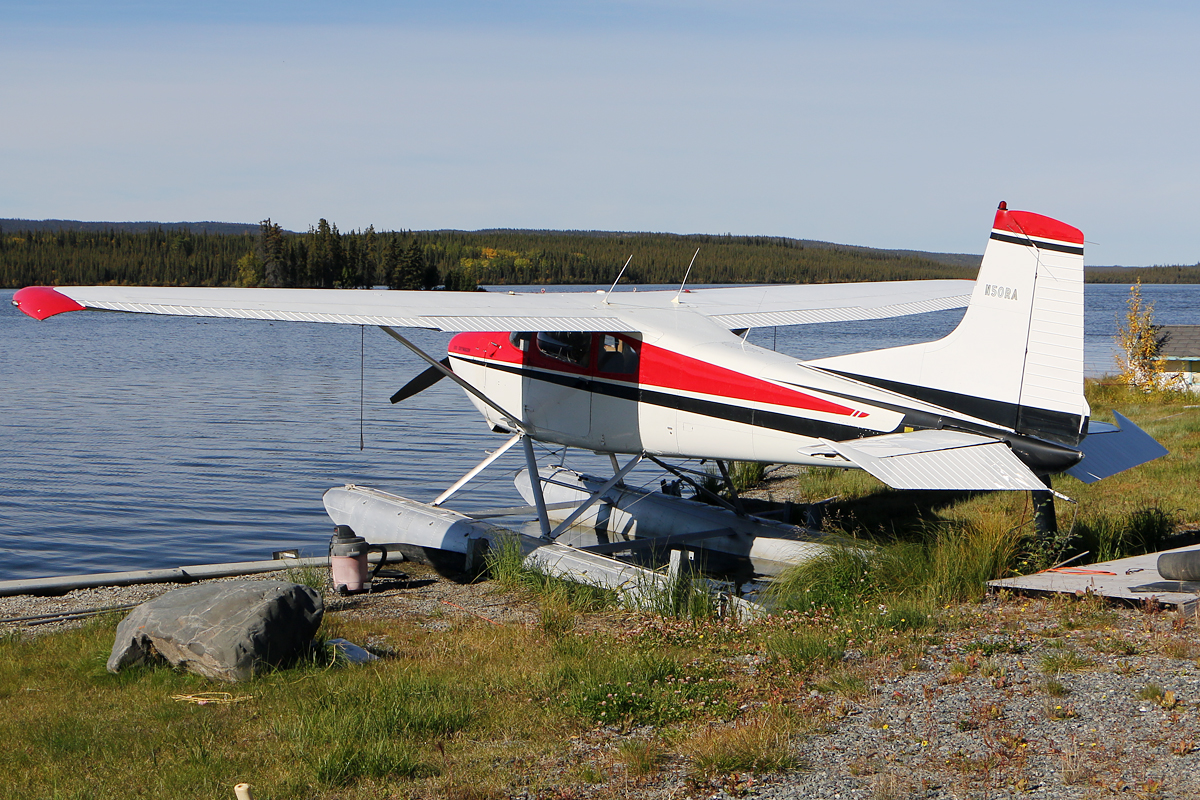
Floatplane at Tolsona Lake

Tolsona (/təlˈsoʊnə/) is a census-designated place (CDP) in Copper River Census Area, Alaska, United States. The population was 12 at the 2020 census, down from 30 in 2010.

== Geography ==
Tolsona is located at 62°6′0″N 146°2′26″W (62.100045, -146.040432).

According to the United States Census Bureau, the CDP has a total area of 46.1 square miles (119 km^{2}), of which 45.0 square miles (117 km^{2}) of it is land and 1.1 square miles (2.8 km^{2}) of it (2.49%) is water.

== Demographics ==
Historical population
Census	Pop.	Note	%±
2000	27		—
2010	30		11.1%
2020	12		−60.0%
U.S. Decennial Census

Tolsona first appeared on the 2000 U.S. Census as a census-designated place (CDP).

As of the census of 2000, there were 27 people, 9 households, and 5 families residing in the CDP. The population density was 0.6 inhabitants per square mile (0.23/km^{2}). There were 46 housing units at an average density of 1.0 per square mile (0.39/km^{2}). The racial makeup of the CDP was 85.19% White, 11.11% Native American, and 3.70% from two or more races. 3.70% of the population were Hispanic or Latino of any race.

There were 9 households, out of which 44.4% had children under the age of 18 living with them, 33.3% were married couples living together, and 44.4% were non-families. 33.3% of all households were made up of individuals, and none had someone living alone who was 65 years of age or older. The average household size was 3.00 and the average family size was 4.20.

In the CDP, the age distribution of the population shows 37.0% under the age of 18, 11.1% from 18 to 24, 29.6% from 25 to 44, 22.2% from 45 to 64, . The median age was 32 years. For every 100 females, there were 285.7 males. For every 100 females age 18 and over, there were 142.9 males.

The median income for a household in the CDP was $11,250, and the median income for a family was $0. Males had a median income of $0 versus $0 for females. The per capita income for the CDP was $10,000. None of the population and none of the families were below the poverty line.
