= Chistochina, Alaska =

Chistochina Tsiis Tl’edze’ Caegge
- CDP
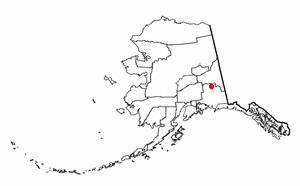
- Location of Chistochina, Alaska
- Coordinates: 62°34′40″N 144°40′11″W
- Country: United States
- State: Alaska
- Census Area: Copper River

Government
  - State senator: Click Bishop (R)
  - State rep.: Mike Cronk (R)

Area
  - Total: 368.79 sq mi (955.17 km^{2})
  - Land: 368.41 sq mi (954.18 km^{2})
  - Water: 0.38 sq mi (0.99 km^{2})

Population (2020)
  - Total: 60
  - Density: 0.16/sq mi (0.06/km^{2})
- Time zone: UTC-9 (Alaska (AKST))
  - Summer (DST): UTC-8 (AKDT)
- Area code: 907
- FIPS code: 02-14000

Chistochina (Tsiis Tl’edze’ Caegge in Ahtna Athabascan) is a census-designated place (CDP) in Copper River Census Area, Alaska, United States. At the 2020 census the population was 60, down from 93 in 2010.

== Geography ==
Chistochina is located at 62°34′40″N 144°40′11″W (62.577713, -144.669613).

Located between mile 31 and 37 on the Tok Cutoff Highway, Chistochina is a midway point between the Canada–US border and Anchorage, or midway between Tok and Glennallen.

According to the United States Census Bureau, the CDP has a total area of 359.8 square miles (932 km^{2}), of which, 359.4 square miles (931 km^{2}) of it is land and 0.4 square miles (1.0 km^{2}) of it (0.11%) is water.

== History ==
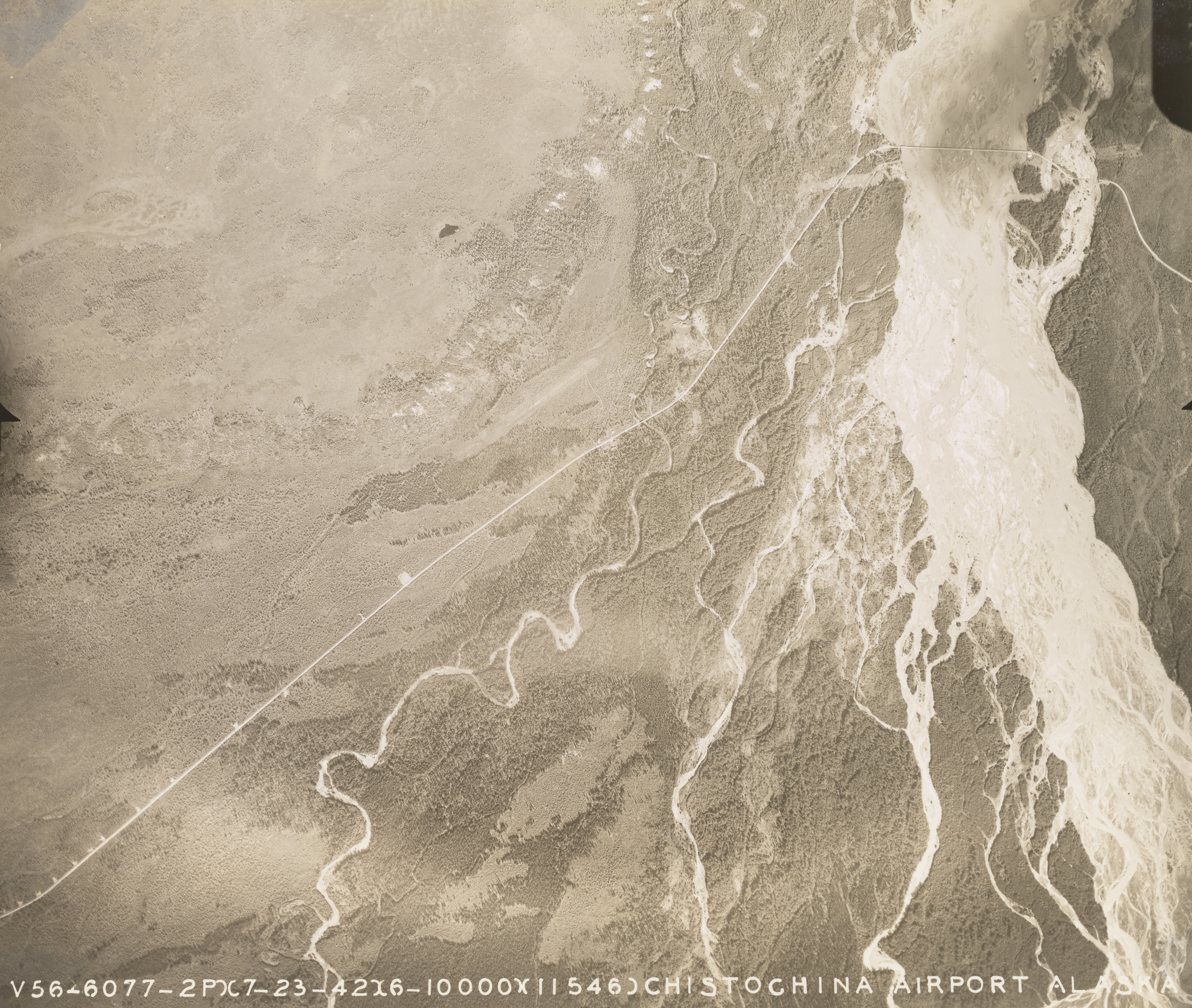
View of Chistochina, 1944

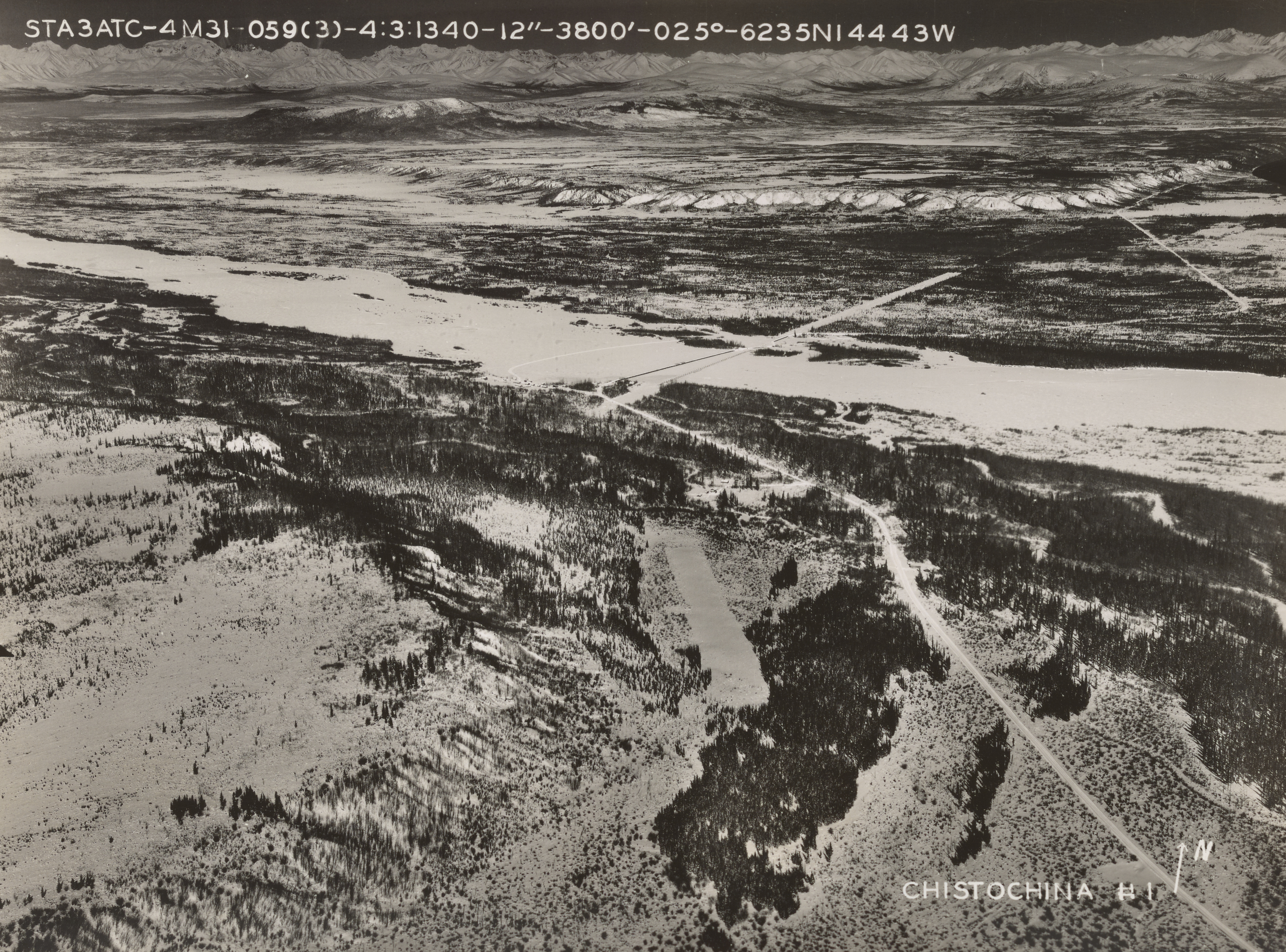
Chistochina Landing Field, 1942

Chistochina began as an Ahtna Athabascan fish camp and a stopover place for traders and trappers. The village access road later became part of the Valdez-Eagle Trail, constructed by miners during the gold rush to the Eagle area in 1897. Chistochina Lodge was built as a roadhouse for prospectors. Gold was mined along the upper Chistochina River and its runoff creeks. The area was settled by homesteaders, although it has remained the most traditional of all Ahtna Athabascan villages.

== Ahtna Athabascans ==
Chistochina is the most traditional Ahtna village and is home to the Cheesh'Na Tribe. The Ahtna name for Mt. Sanford is Kelt'aeni.

== Demographics ==
Historical population
Census	Pop.	Note	%±
1940	34		—
1950	31		−8.8%
1960	28		−9.7%
1970	33		17.9%
1980	55		66.7%
1990	60		9.1%
2000	93		55.0%
2010	93		0.0%
2020	60		−35.5%
U.S. Decennial Census

Chistochina first appeared on the 1940 U.S. Census as the unincorporated village of "Chestochina." It was returned in 1950 and every successive census as Chistochina. It was made a census-designated area in 1980.

There were 37 households, out of which 29.7% had children under the age of 18 living with them, 43.2% were married couples living together, 13.5% had a female householder with no husband present, and 29.7% were non-families. 27.0% of all households were made up of individuals, and 13.5% had someone living alone who was 65 years of age or older. The average household size was 2.51 and the average family size was 2.92.

In the CDP, the population was spread out, with 25.8% under the age of 18, 7.5% from 18 to 24, 28.0% from 25 to 44, 22.6% from 45 to 64, and 16.1% who were 65 years of age or older. The median age was 38 years. For every 100 females, there were 121.4 males. For every 100 females age 18 and over, there were 122.6 males.

The median income for a household in the CDP was $24,107, and the median income for a family was $41,250. Males had a median income of $41,250 versus $0 for females. The per capita income for the CDP was $12,362. There were 29.6% of families and 28.6% of the population living below the poverty line, including 18.2% of under eighteens and 27.3% of those over 64.

== Education ==
The Copper River School District previously operated the Chistochina School.
