= Copper River School District =

School district in Alaska, United States

Coordinates: 62.1126°N 145.5280°W

Address
- 1976 Aurora Drive Glennallen, Alaska, 99588; United States

District information
- Type: Public
- Grades: Pre-K–12
- NCES District ID: 0200070

Students and staff
- Students: 393
- Teachers: 22.7
- Staff: 79.3
- Student–teacher ratio: 17.31

Other information
- Website: www.crsd.us

Copper River School District (CRSD) is a school district headquartered in Glennallen, Alaska. CRSD is known for being made up of several schools. The schools at times collaborate to achieve new educational opportunities. This is done primarily by VTC, or by transportation of students to either of the three schools.

== Schools ==
- Glennallen School - Divided into elementary and junior/senior high school divisions. [Dubbed the largest school in the CRSD.]
  - The elementary was honored by the Blue Ribbon Schools Program in 2009.
- Kenny Lake School is not in Copper Center. However, Kenny Lake may be associated with Copper Center due to the relative closeness of distance. [Kenny Lake and Copper Center are 25.8 miles apart.]
- Slana School

There is also a home learning program called "Upstream Learning".

It previously operated Chistochina School, Gakona Elementary, and Lottie Sparks Elementary in Nelchina.
