= Mendeltna, Alaska =

Mendeltna Bendilna’
- CDP
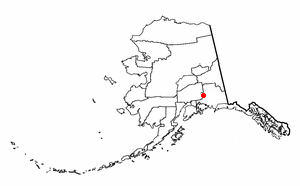
- Location of Mendeltna, Alaska
- Coordinates: 62°3′35″N 146°26′20″W
- Country: United States
- State: Alaska
- Census Area: Copper River

Government
  - State senator: Click Bishop (R)
  - State rep.: Mike Cronk (R)

Area
  - Total: 458.52 sq mi (1,187.55 km^{2})
  - Land: 451.68 sq mi (1,169.85 km^{2})
  - Water: 6.83 sq mi (17.70 km^{2})
- Elevation: 2,441 ft (744 m)

Population (2020)
  - Total: 36
  - Density: 0.078/sq mi (0.03/km^{2})
- Time zone: UTC-9 (Alaska (AKST))
  - Summer (DST): UTC-8 (AKDT)
- Area code: 907
- FIPS code: 02-48200
- GNIS feature ID: 1866962

Mendeltna (Bendilna’ in Ahtna) is a census-designated place (CDP) in Copper River Census Area, Alaska, United States. The population was 36 at the 2020 census, down from 39 in 2010.

== Geography ==
Mendeltna is located at 62°3′35″N 146°26′20″W (62.059604, -146.438981).

According to the United States Census Bureau, the CDP has a total area of 457.1 square miles (1,184 km^{2}), of which, 447.6 square miles (1,159 km^{2}) of it is land and 9.4 square miles (24 km^{2}) of it (2.06%) is water.

== Demographics ==
Historical population
Census	Pop.	Note	%±
1990	37		—
2000	63		70.3%
2010	39		−38.1%
2020	36		−7.7%
U.S. Decennial Census

Mendeltna first reported on the 1990 U.S. Census as a census-designated place (CDP).

As of the census of 2000, there were 63 people, 23 households, and 14 families residing in the CDP. The population density was 0.1 inhabitants per square mile (0.039/km^{2}). There were 33 housing units at an average density of 0.1 per square mile (0.039/km^{2}). The racial makeup of the CDP was 92.06% White and 7.94% Native American.

There were 23 households, out of which 30.4% had children under the age of 18 living with them, 47.8% were married couples living together, 17.4% had a female householder with no husband present, and 34.8% were non-families. 30.4% of all households were made up of individuals, and 8.7% had someone living alone who was 65 years of age or older. The average household size was 2.74 and the average family size was 3.53.

In the CDP, the age distribution of the population shows 33.3% under the age of 18, 4.8% from 18 to 24, 31.7% from 25 to 44, 17.5% from 45 to 64, and 12.7% who were 65 years of age or older. The median age was 37 years. For every 100 females, there were 90.9 males. For every 100 females age 18 and over, there were 110.0 males.

The median income for a household in the CDP was $30,000, and the median income for a family was $28,750. Males had a median income of $22,083 versus $8,750 for females. The per capita income for the CDP was $11,289. There were no families and none of the population living below the poverty line, including no under eighteens and none of those over 64.
