= Tonsina, Alaska =

- CDP
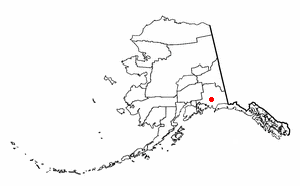
- Location of Tonsina, Alaska
- Coordinates: 61°39′43″N 145°10′39″W
- Country: United States
- State: Alaska
- Census Area: Copper River

Government
  - State senators: Click Bishop (R); Mike Shower (R)
  - State reps.: Mike Cronk (R); George Rauscher (R)

Area
  - Total: 159.25 sq mi (412.45 km^{2})
  - Land: 158.99 sq mi (411.79 km^{2})
  - Water: 0.25 sq mi (0.66 km^{2})
- Elevation: 1,565 ft (477 m)

Population (2020)
  - Total: 55
  - Density: 0.34/sq mi (0.13/km^{2})
- Time zone: UTC-9 (Alaska (AKST))
  - Summer (DST): UTC-8 (AKDT)
- Area code: 907
- FIPS code: 02-78350
- GNIS feature ID: 1411105

Tonsina /tɒnˈsiːnə/ is a census-designated place (CDP) in Copper River Census Area, Alaska, United States. At the 2020 census the population was 55, down from 78 in 2010.

Tonsina is part of the Copper River Valley area. The centerpiece of Tonsina valley is the Tonsina River Lodge. This roadhouse alongside the Richardson Highway consists of a bar, restaurant, gas station, convenience and liquor store, laundromat and showers. There is also a camping area, RV park and motel. A main attraction of the roadhouse is the historic hotel.

The Tonsina River Lodge is a rambling, shambling, gravel-covered spread, with weatherbeaten buildings. The historic hotel is an orange, three story Army barracks with a red tin roof. It once was a brothel. The lodge is at the end of an airplane runway. The lodge sits in the foothills of several towering, snow-capped mountain ranges, next to a stream. In 2006, the flooding from the stream took out the two-lane concrete bridge that crosses the stream. Connecting Valdez to Anchorage, the Richardson Highway bridge was repaired in two weeks.

== Geography ==
Tonsina is located at 61°39′43″N 145°10′39″W (61.661883, -145.177582).

According to the United States Census Bureau, the CDP has a total area of 148.0 square miles (383 km^{2}), of which, 147.8 square miles (383 km^{2}) of it is land and 0.2 square miles (0.52 km^{2}) of it (0.13%) is water.

== Climate ==
Tonsina has a continental subarctic climate (Köppen Dfc).

Climate data for Tonsina, Alaska (1991–2020 normals, extremes 1907–2014)
Month	Jan	Feb	Mar	Apr	May	Jun	Jul	Aug	Sep	Oct	Nov	Dec	Year
Record high °F (°C)	46 (8)	48 (9)	54 (12)	69 (21)	79 (26)	90 (32)	88 (31)	88 (31)	79 (26)	67 (19)	51 (11)	50 (10)	90 (32)
Mean maximum °F (°C)	32.0 (0.0)	36.6 (2.6)	44.1 (6.7)	57.6 (14.2)	72.6 (22.6)	81.6 (27.6)	81.7 (27.6)	77.4 (25.2)	64.5 (18.1)	51.5 (10.8)	34.0 (1.1)	32.2 (0.1)	84.3 (29.1)
Mean daily maximum °F (°C)	4.9 (−15.1)	17.1 (−8.3)	29.0 (−1.7)	44.5 (6.9)	57.3 (14.1)	66.6 (19.2)	69.6 (20.9)	64.8 (18.2)	53.6 (12.0)	35.7 (2.1)	14.7 (−9.6)	6.6 (−14.1)	38.7 (3.7)
Daily mean °F (°C)	−2.3 (−19.1)	6.0 (−14.4)	14.0 (−10.0)	31.6 (−0.2)	43.9 (6.6)	53.2 (11.8)	57.1 (13.9)	52.4 (11.3)	42.3 (5.7)	26.5 (−3.1)	7.4 (−13.7)	−0.5 (−18.1)	27.6 (−2.4)
Mean daily minimum °F (°C)	−9.5 (−23.1)	−5.1 (−20.6)	−1.0 (−18.3)	18.6 (−7.4)	30.6 (−0.8)	39.7 (4.3)	44.6 (7.0)	40.0 (4.4)	30.9 (−0.6)	17.3 (−8.2)	0.2 (−17.7)	−7.6 (−22.0)	16.6 (−8.6)
Mean minimum °F (°C)	−37.2 (−38.4)	−27.1 (−32.8)	−22.0 (−30.0)	0.6 (−17.4)	22.1 (−5.5)	28.2 (−2.1)	33.8 (1.0)	28.4 (−2.0)	16.9 (−8.4)	−2.9 (−19.4)	−21.4 (−29.7)	−31.0 (−35.0)	−43.0 (−41.7)
Record low °F (°C)	−60 (−51)	−53 (−47)	−46 (−43)	−24 (−31)	6 (−14)	18 (−8)	26 (−3)	17 (−8)	−1 (−18)	−23 (−31)	−42 (−41)	−61 (−52)	−61 (−52)
Average precipitation inches (mm)	1.06 (27)	1.01 (26)	0.45 (11)	0.17 (4.3)	0.48 (12)	1.42 (36)	1.79 (45)	1.76 (45)	1.50 (38)	1.04 (26)	1.27 (32)	1.30 (33)	13.25 (337)
Average snowfall inches (cm)	9.3 (24)	12.4 (31)	6.0 (15)	2.2 (5.6)	0.4 (1.0)	0.0 (0.0)	0.0 (0.0)	0.0 (0.0)	1.6 (4.1)	9.1 (23)	17.0 (43)	13.8 (35)	71.8 (182)
Average precipitation days (≥ 0.01inch)	6.2	6.1	3.2	2.0	3.7	7.8	10.3	11.6	10.0	8.2	7.7	7.1	83.9
Average snowy days (≥ 0.1inch)	5.8	5.5	3.2	1.5	0.2	0.0	0.0	0.0	0.8	4.6	6.9	6.7	35.2
Source 1: NOAA
Source 2: WRCC

== Demographics ==
Historical population
Census	Pop.	Note	%±
1980	135		—
1990	38		−71.9%
2000	92		142.1%
2010	78		−15.2%
2020	55		−29.5%
U.S. Decennial Census

Tonsina first appeared on the 1980 U.S. Census as a census-designated place (CDP).

As of the census of 2000, there were 92 people, 34 households, and 21 families residing in the CDP. The population density was 0.6 inhabitants per square mile (0.23/km^{2}). There were 45 housing units at an average density of 0.3 per square mile (0.12/km^{2}). The racial makeup of the CDP was 84.78% White, 2.17% Black or African American, 9.78% Native American and 3.26% Asian.

There were 34 households, out of which 35.3% had children under the age of 18 living with them, 55.9% were married couples living together, 2.9% had a female householder with no husband present, and 35.3% were non-families. 26.5% of all households were made up of individuals, and 5.9% had someone living alone who was 65 years of age or older. The average household size was 2.71 and the average family size was 3.45.

In the CDP, the age distribution of the population shows 32.6% under the age of 18, 4.3% from 18 to 24, 17.4% from 25 to 44, 28.3% from 45 to 64, and 17.4% who were 65 years of age or older. The median age was 42 years. For every 100 females, there were 142.1 males. For every 100 females age 18 and over, there were 121.4 males.

The median income for a household in the CDP was $32,188, and the median income for a family was $48,750. Males had a median income of $58,000 versus $25,000 for females. The per capita income for the CDP was $13,390. There were 7.4% of families and 6.7% of the population living below the poverty line, including no under eighteens and none of those over 64.

== Parks ==
The Squirrel Creek State Recreation Site is a small 160 acres (65 ha) park on the banks of the Tonsina. The park has a campground, and access to the river, a creek, and a small lake, offering fishing for various species of trout and salmon.

== See also ==
- Mount Billy Mitchell (Chugach Mountains)
