= Mentasta Lake, Alaska =

Mentasta Lake Mendaesde
- CDP
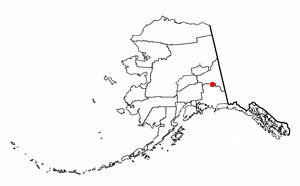
- Location of Mentasta Lake, Alaska
- Coordinates: 62°55′26″N 143°32′0″W
- Country: United States
- State: Alaska
- Census Area: Copper River

Government
  - State senator: Click Bishop (R)
  - State rep.: Mike Cronk (R)

Area
  - Total: 302.53 sq mi (783.54 km^{2})
  - Land: 300.63 sq mi (778.62 km^{2})
  - Water: 1.90 sq mi (4.92 km^{2})

Population (2020)
  - Total: 127
  - Density: 0.41/sq mi (0.16/km^{2})
- Time zone: UTC-9 (Alaska (AKST))
  - Summer (DST): UTC-8 (AKDT)
- Area code: 907
- FIPS code: 02-48540

Mentasta Lake (Ahtena: Mendaesde) is a census-designated place (CDP) in Copper River Census Area, Alaska, United States. As of the 2020 census, Mentasta Lake had a population of 127.

== Geography ==
Mentasta Lake is located at 62°55′26″N 143°32′00″W (62.923924, -143.533240).

According to the United States Census Bureau, the CDP has a total area of 305.1 square miles (790 km^{2}), of which, 303.1 square miles (785 km^{2}) of it is land and 2.0 square miles (5.2 km^{2}) of it (0.66%) is water.

== Demographics ==
Historical population
Census	Pop.	Note	%±
1940	15		—
1960	40		—
1970	68		70.0%
1980	59		−13.2%
1990	96		62.7%
2000	142		47.9%
2010	112		−21.1%
2020	127		13.4%
U.S. Decennial Census

Mentasta Lake first reported on the 1940 U.S. Census as "Montasta Lake", an unincorporated native village. It did not report in 1950. It next appeared in 1960 as "Mentasta." In 1970, it returned as Mentasta Lake. In 1980 it was made a census-designated place (CDP).

As of the census of 2000, there were 142 people, 54 households, and 32 families residing in the CDP. The population density was 0.5 inhabitants per square mile (0.19/km^{2}). There were 89 housing units at an average density of 0.3 per square mile (0.12/km^{2}). The racial makeup of the CDP was 28.87% White, 62.68% Native American, and 8.45% from two or more races.

There were 54 households, out of which 31.5% had children under the age of 18 living with them, 38.9% were married couples living together, 16.7% had a female householder with no husband present, and 38.9% were non-families. 29.6% of all households were made up of individuals, and 5.6% had someone living alone who was 65 years of age or older. The average household size was 2.63 and the average family size was 3.33.

In the CDP, the age distribution of the population shows 35.2% under the age of 18, 7.7% from 18 to 24, 23.9% from 25 to 44, 26.8% from 45 to 64, and 6.3% who were 65 years of age or older. The median age was 32 years. For every 100 females, there were 102.9 males. For every 100 females age 18 and over, there were 119.0 males.

The median income for a household in the CDP was $17,344, and the median income for a family was $24,167. Males had a median income of $20,833 versus $30,417 for females. The per capita income for the CDP was $11,275. There were 21.9% of families and 35.7% of the population living below the poverty line, including 40.0% of under eighteens and none of those over 64.

== Education ==
Mentasta Lake is part of the Alaska Gateway School District. Mentasta Lake Katie John School, a K-12 campus, serves community students.

The late subsistence hunting and fishing rights activist Katie John of Mentasta, who died at 97 on 5/31/13, helped develop an Ahtna language alphabet in the 1970s, and has recorded a pronunciation guide of the Mentasta Dialect.
