= Silver Springs, Alaska =

- CDP
- Location within the state of Alaska
- Coordinates: 62°1′16″N 145°21′16″W
- Country: United States
- State: Alaska
- Census Area: Copper River

Government
  - State senator: Click Bishop (R)
  - State rep.: Mike Cronk (R)

Area
  - Total: 2.56 sq mi (6.64 km^{2})
  - Land: 2.56 sq mi (6.64 km^{2})
  - Water: 0 sq mi (0.00 km^{2})

Population (2020)
  - Total: 111
  - Density: 43.3/sq mi (16.73/km^{2})
- Time zone: UTC-9 (Alaska (AKST))
  - Summer (DST): UTC-8 (AKDT)
- Area code: 907
- FIPS code: 02-70320

Silver Springs is a census-designated place (CDP) in Copper River Census Area, Alaska, United States. At the 2020 census the population was 111, down from 114 in 2010.

== Geography ==
Silver Springs is located at 62°01′16″N 145°21′16″W.

According to the United States Census Bureau, the CDP has a total area of 2.9 square miles (7.5 km^{2}), all of it land.

== Demographics ==
Historical population
Census	Pop.	Note	%±
2000	130		—
2010	114		−12.3%
2020	111		−2.6%
U.S. Decennial Census

Silver Springs first appeared on the 2000 U.S. Census as a census-designated place (CDP).

As of the census of 2000, there were 130 people, 46 households, and 35 families residing in the CDP. The population density was 45.1 inhabitants per square mile (17.4/km^{2}). There were 55 housing units at an average density of 19.1 per square mile (7.4/km^{2}). The racial makeup of the CDP was 86.15% White, 8.46% Native American, 2.31% from other races, and 3.08% from two or more races.

There were 46 households, out of which 50.0% had children under the age of 18 living with them, 69.6% were married couples living together, 4.3% had a female householder with no husband present, and 23.9% were non-families. 23.9% of all households were made up of individuals, and 6.5% had someone living alone who was 65 years of age or older. The average household size was 2.83 and the average family size was 3.34.

In the CDP, the age distribution of the population shows 38.5% under the age of 18, 0.8% from 18 to 24, 32.3% from 25 to 44, 24.6% from 45 to 64, and 3.8% who were 65 years of age or older. The median age was 35 years. For every 100 females, there were 120.3 males. For every 100 females age 18 and over, there were 116.2 males.

The median income for a household in the CDP was $53,750, and the median income for a family was $74,583. Males had a median income of $55,208 versus $28,750 for females. The per capita income for the CDP was $23,464. There were 6.9% of families and 7.4% of the population living below the poverty line, including 11.4% of under eighteens and none of those over 64.
