= Eyak, Alaska =

Unincorporated community in the state of Alaska, United States

Coordinates: 60°31′30″N 145°36′00″W

Eyak, Alaska Igya'aq
- Unincorporated community
- Interactive map of Eyak, Alaska
- Country: United States
- State: Alaska
- Census Area: Chugach

Government
  - State senator: Gary Stevens (R)
  - State rep.: Louise Stutes (R)

Population (2010)
  - Total: 128

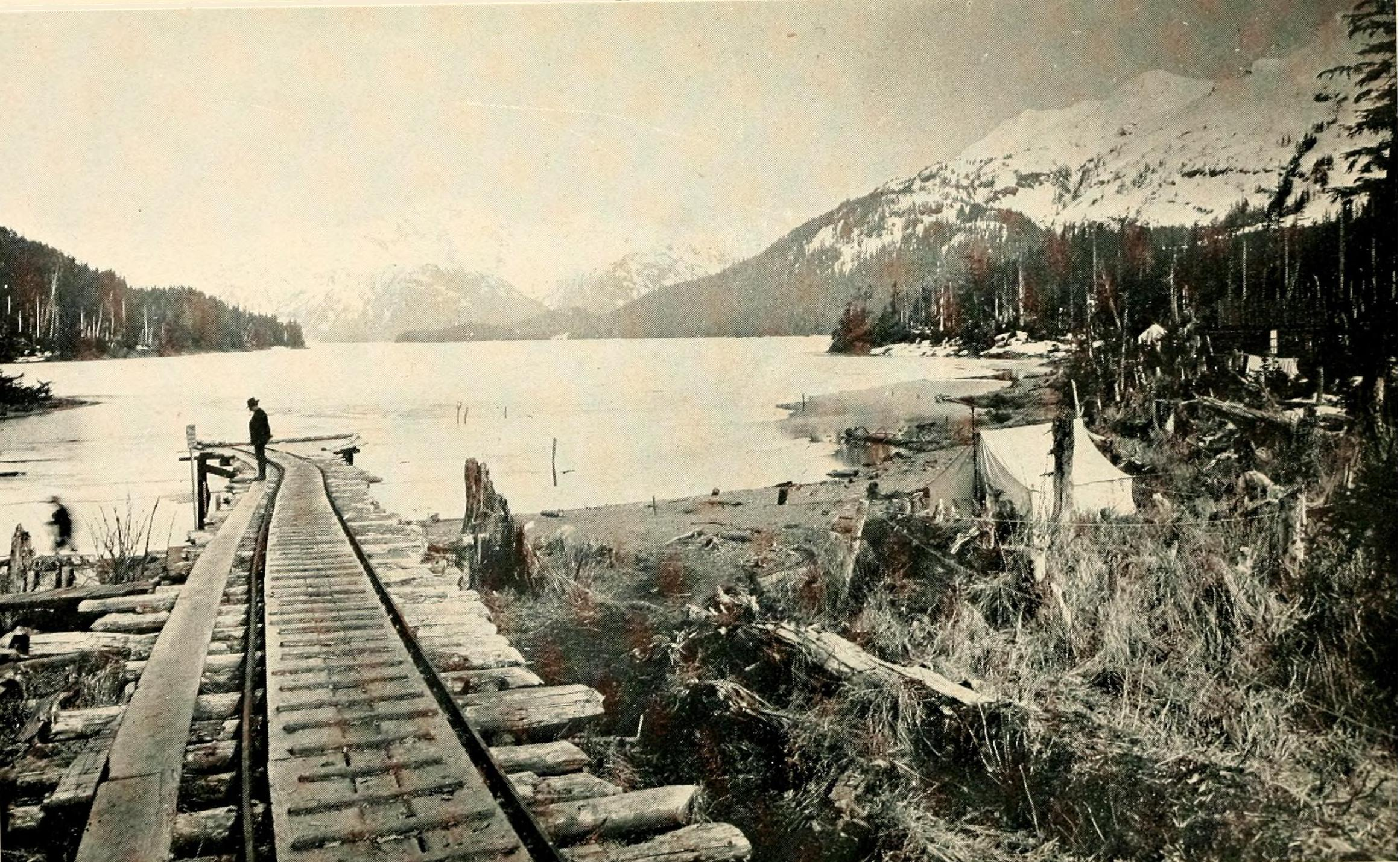

Eyak (Igya'aq in Alutiiq; ’Iiyaaq(daat) in Eyak) is an Alaska Native Village Statistic Area within the city of Cordova, Alaska in Chugach Census Area, Alaska, United States. It was formerly a census-designated place (CDP) from 1980 to 1990, before being annexed to Cordova. As of 2010 the population was 128, down from 168 in 2000.

The community was named after the Eyak people.

== Demographics ==
Historical population
Census	Pop.	Note	%±
1900	222		—
1920	320		—
1930	366		14.4%
1940	365		−0.3%
1980	47		—
1990	172		266.0%
2000	168		−2.3%
2010	128		−23.8%
U.S. Decennial Census

Eyak first appeared on the *1900 U.S. Census as an unincorporated village (*note may have appeared previously as Ighiak in 1890, requires more research). It next appeared on the 1920-1940 censuses and then not again until 1980 when it was made a census-designated place (CDP). After 1990 it was annexed into the city of Cordova. However, it still holds the distinction of being an Alaskan Native Village Statistical Area (ANVSA) within Cordova in the 2000 and 2010 U.S. Censuses.
