= Copper River Census Area, Alaska =

Census area in the state of Alaska, United States

- Borough
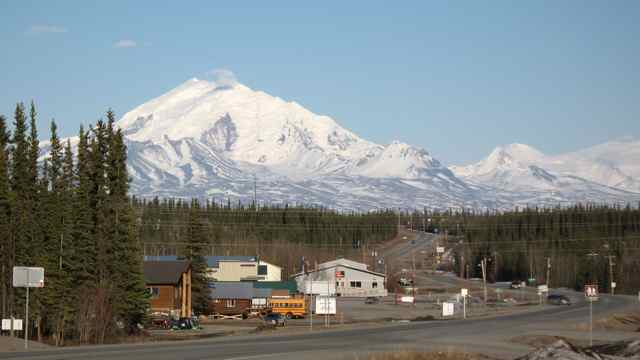
- Scenic view of Glennallen, the largest community in the Copper River Census Area

- Location within the U.S. state of Alaska
- Coordinates: 62°02′N 143°55′W
- Country: United States
- State: Alaska
- Founded: January 2, 2019
- Named for: Copper River
- Largest CDP: Glennallen

Area
  - Total: 24,692 sq mi (63,950 km^{2})

Population (2020)
  - Total: 2,617
  - Estimate (2025): 2,666 ▲
  - Density: 0.105/sq mi (0.041/km^{2})
- Time zone: UTC−9 (Alaska)
  - Summer (DST): UTC−8 (ADT)
- Congressional district: At-large

Copper River Census Area is a census area located in the state of Alaska, United States. It is part of the Unorganized Borough and therefore has no borough seat. On January 2, 2019, it was split from the Valdez–Cordova Census Area, along with neighboring Chugach Census Area.

As of the 2020 census, the census area had a population of 2,617; its largest communities are the census-designated places of Glennallen and Copper Center.

It is named after Copper River, which has rich fish and flows through the census area.

== Demographics ==
=== 2020 census ===
Copper River Census Area, Alaska – Racial and ethnic composition Note: the US Census treats Hispanic/Latino as an ethnic category. This table excludes Latinos from the racial categories and assigns them to a separate category. Hispanics/Latinos may be of any race.
| Race / Ethnicity (NH = Non-Hispanic) | Pop 2020 | 2020 |
|---|---|---|
| White alone (NH) | 1,591 | 60.79% |
| Black or African American alone (NH) | 6 | 0.23% |
| Native American or Alaska Native alone (NH) | 645 | 24.65% |
| Asian alone (NH) | 17 | 0.65% |
| Native Hawaiian or Pacific Islander alone (NH) | 10 | 0.38% |
| Other race alone (NH) | 15 | 0.57% |
| Mixed race or Multiracial (NH) | 249 | 9.51% |
| Hispanic or Latino (any race) | 84 | 3.21% |
| Total | 2,617 | 100.00% |

As of the 2020 census, the census area had a population of 2,617. The median age was 44.6 years. 22.4% of residents were under the age of 18 and 18.7% of residents were 65 years of age or older. For every 100 females there were 119.0 males, and for every 100 females age 18 and over there were 121.7 males age 18 and over.

The racial makeup of the census area was 61.6% White, 0.3% Black or African American, 25.3% American Indian and Alaska Native, 0.6% Asian, 0.4% Native Hawaiian and Pacific Islander, 1.0% from some other race, and 10.8% from two or more races. Hispanic or Latino residents of any race comprised 3.2% of the population.

0.0% of residents lived in urban areas, while 100.0% lived in rural areas.

There were 1,134 households in the census area, of which 26.5% had children under the age of 18 living with them and 19.9% had a female householder with no spouse or partner present. About 36.1% of all households were made up of individuals and 12.4% had someone living alone who was 65 years of age or older.

There were 2,769 housing units, of which 59.0% were vacant. Among occupied housing units, 75.1% were owner-occupied and 24.9% were renter-occupied. The homeowner vacancy rate was 2.3% and the rental vacancy rate was 16.4%.

=== 2010 census ===
According to the 2010 United States census (in which it was reported as the "Copper River Census Subarea"), the census area had a population of 2,952; 2,229 (75.5%) of whom were over the age of 18, and 321 (10.9%) of whom were over the age of 65. 2,032 residents (68.8%) were reported as White alone (2,020/68.4% non-Hispanic white), 11 (0.4%) as Black, 678 (23.0%) as American Indian or Alaska Native, 11 (0.4%) as Asian, 13 (0.4%) as Native Hawaiian or other Pacific Islander, 5 (0.2%) as some other race, and 202 (6.9%) as two or more races. 53 people (1.8%) were Hispanic or Latino (they may be of any of the above racial categories).

== Communities ==
=== Census-designated places ===
- Chisana
- Chistochina
- Chitina
- Copper Center
- Gakona
- Glennallen
- Gulkana
- Kenny Lake
- McCarthy
- Mendeltna
- Mentasta Lake
- Nabesna
- Nelchina
- Paxson
- Silver Springs
- Slana
- Tazlina
- Tolsona
- Tonsina
- Willow Creek

=== Unincorporated community ===
- Copperville (Also a former CDP)

== Politics ==
Copper River Census Area is a Republican stronghold. It has only voted in two elections (2020 and 2024) since its creation; yet it gave more than two-thirds of its vote to Donald Trump in each. Thus, this is one of six counties or county equivalents that have voted Republican for president in every election since they came into existence. (Note: Along with Leslie County, Kentucky (since 1880); Doniphan County, Kansas (since 1864); Poquoson, Virginia (since 1976); Colonial Heights, Virginia (since 1952); and Chugach Census Area, Alaska (since 2020).)

United States presidential election results for Copper River Census Area, Alaska
| Year | Republican | | Democratic | | Third party(ies) | |
| Year | No. | % | No. | % | No. | % |
|---|---|---|---|---|---|---|
| 2020 | 1,130 | 66.90% | 480 | 28.42% | 79 | 4.68% |
| 2024 | 995 | 69.63% | 359 | 25.12% | 75 | 5.25% |
