= Mike Cronk =

American politician

- Cronk in 2023

Minority Leader of the Alaska Senate
- Incumbent
- Assumed office December 16, 2025
- Preceded by: Mike Shower

Member of the Alaska Senate
- Incumbent
- Assumed office January 21, 2025
- Preceded by: Click Bishop
- Constituency: R District

Member of the Alaska House of Representatives
- In office January 19, 2021 – January 21, 2025
- Preceded by: Dave Talerico
- Succeeded by: Rebecca Schwanke
- Constituency: 6th district (2021-2023); 36th district (2023-2025)

Personal details
- Born: 1970 or 1971 (age 55–56) Oklahoma City, Oklahoma, U.S.
- Party: Republican
- Education: University of Alaska, Fairbanks (BA)

Mike Cronk (born 1970/1971) is an American politician from Alaska serving as a member of the Alaska Senate since 2025. He previously served in the Alaska House of Representatives starting in 2021. A Republican, he represented the 36th State House district, which encompasses most of interior Alaska and Copper River Census Area. In December 2025 he was elected as senate minority leader.

== Personal life ==
Cronk was present at the 2017 Las Vegas shooting.

== Electoral history ==
Nonpartisan primary
Party	Candidate	Votes	%
Republican	Mike Cronk	3,305	43.8
Independent	Savannah Fletcher	3,193	42.3
Republican	James Squyres (withdrew)	572	7.6
Independence	Robert Williams	481	6.4
Total votes		7,551	100.0

2024 Alaska Senate General election
Party	Candidate	Votes	%
Republican	Mike Cronk	9,387	51.84
Independent	Savannah Fletcher	7,509	41.47
Independence	Robert Williams	1,157	6.39
Write-in		56	0.31
Total votes		18,109	100.0
Republican hold			
Minority Caucus gain from Coalition			

Alaska Senate
Preceded by Mike Shower	Minority Leader of the Alaska Senate; 2025–present	Incumbent
