= Click Bishop =

American politician (born 1957)

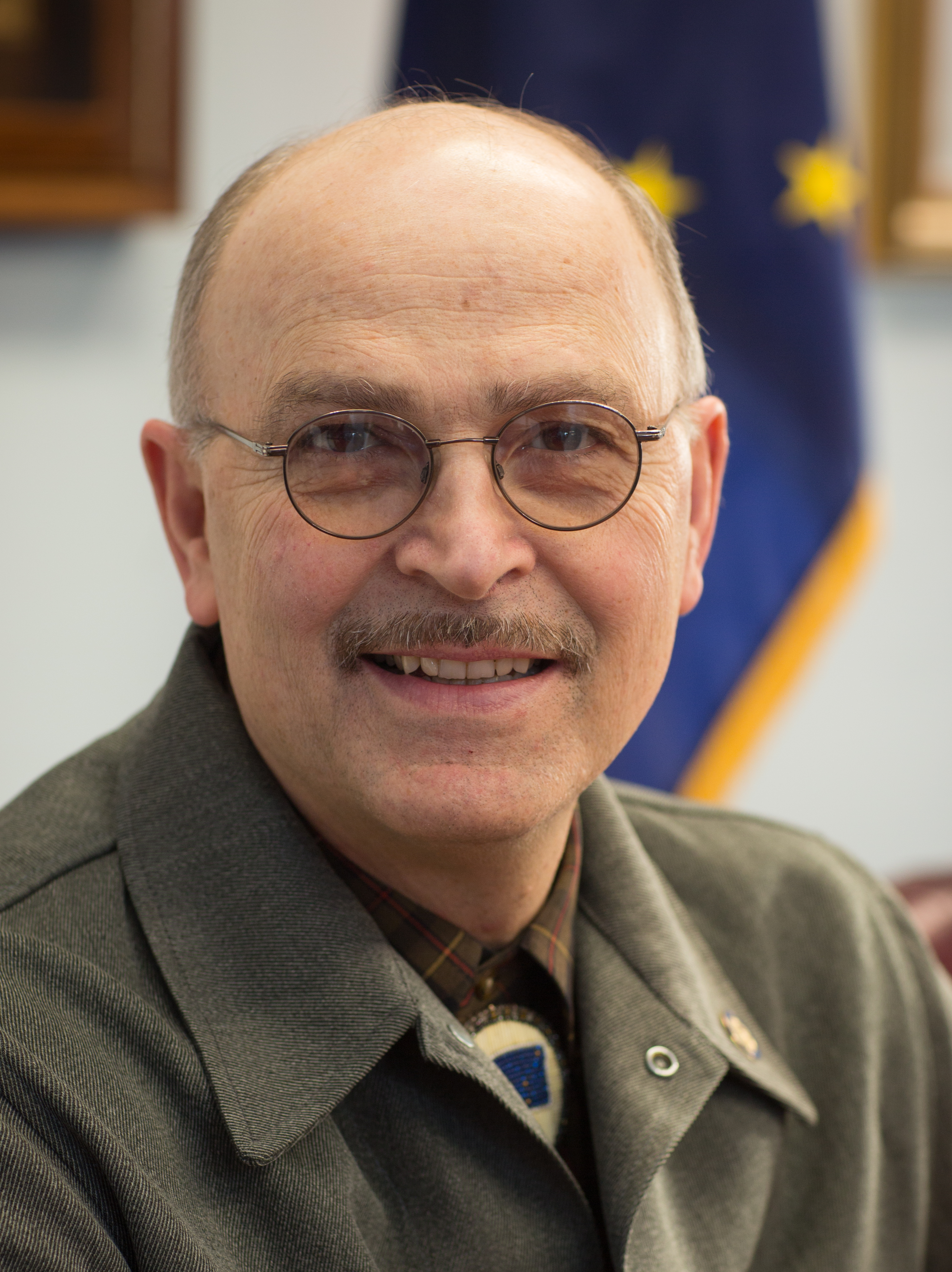
- Bishop in January 2019

Member of the Alaska Senate
- In office January 18, 2013 – January 21, 2025
- Preceded by: Redistricted
- Succeeded by: Mike Cronk
- Constituency: District C (2013−2023); District R (2023−2025)

Commissioner of the Alaska Department of Labor and Workforce Development
- In office January 11, 2007 – April 2012
- Governor: Sarah Palin; Sean Parnell
- Preceded by: Greg O’Claray
- Succeeded by: Dianne Blumer

Personal details
- Born: Clark Calvin Bishop; July 25, 1957 (age 69) Mexico, Missouri, U.S.
- Party: Republican
- Spouse: Darlene
- Children: 2

Clark Calvin "Click" Bishop (born July 25, 1957) is an American politician. A member of the Republican Party, he served in the Alaska Senate from 2013 to 2025. Bishop represented the western Fairbanks North Star Borough and many rural communities in Interior Alaska. Bishop served as the state's Commissioner of the Department of Labor and Workforce Development from 2007 to 2012.

== Early life ==
Clark Bishop was born on July 25, 1957, in Mexico, Missouri, the older of two children born to Howell Calvin Bishop and wife Jacqueline (née Murphy). In 1959, the family moved to Alaska. They spent over a decade living in a variety of small settlements along the Alaska Highway and Richardson Highway corridors while the elder Bishop worked in construction. Bishop moved to Fairbanks to complete his education, graduating from Lathrop High School in 1974.

== Union career ==
After graduation from high school, Bishop joined the International Union of Operating Engineers Local 302 and, starting with the construction of the Trans-Alaska Pipeline System, worked on diverse construction projects across the state. From 1991 until his retirement from the union in 2006, Bishop was the administrator and coordinator for the Alaska Operating Engineers/Employers Training Trust. The Trust offers heavy equipment training for apprentice and journey-level workers.

== Political career ==
Bishop somewhat reluctantly left retirement later in 2006 to become Labor Commissioner, the head of the Department of Labor and Workforce Development, under newly elected Governor Sarah Palin. When Governor Palin resigned in July 2009, her successor, former lieutenant governor Sean Parnell, kept Bishop on as Labor Commissioner. When Parnell was elected governor in his own right in November 2010, he again retained Bishop as head of the Department of Labor and Workforce Development. Bishop retired as Labor Commissioner in March 2012, and less than two months later filed a letter of intent with the Alaska Public Offices Commission (APOC) to run for a Senate seat.

=== 2013-2014 Alaska Senate term ===
Bishop entered elected politics via the hotly contested 2012 Republican primary for Senate Seat C, newly created by redistricting. At that time the Senate was controlled by a bipartisan coalition of moderates, and the main campaign issue in that primary was a pledge not to join the coalition, but only the Republican caucus. Unlike his two primary opponents, Bishop did not take the pledge, explaining that he would join whatever group that would best lower energy costs in interior Alaska. Bishop's chief opponent, former state senator Ralph Seekins, charged that Bishop was not a “real Republican”, citing Bishop's past lack of involvement with the state Republican Party organization. Seekins saw labor union contributions to Bishop's campaign as a sign that the Democratic Party was secretly supporting Bishop (Bishop replied that, given his long union history, union support was to be expected). This primary race was the most expensive in the state, with Seekins funding most of his own campaign. Bishop won the three-way August 28 Republican primary with 47% of the vote.

Bishop faced Democrat Anne Sudkamp in the general election. In contrast to the fierce primary, the general election was characterized by positive campaigns on both sides. Sudkamp said, “I have to say that it’s been great running against Click Bishop. We’re not running negative campaigns and we’re getting our ideas out and we’re enjoying campaigning.” Bishop easily defeated Sudkamp's shoestring campaign with 70% of the vote. After the election, changes in the makeup of the Senate led to the dissolution of the bipartisan Senate leadership coalition. Bishop joined the Republican caucus that replaced it.

Bishop served on the powerful Finance Committee, a committee on which he would remain for his entire Senate career. He also served as co-chair of the Senate Special Committee on In-State Energy. Bishop and other House and Senate lawmakers from interior Alaska shepherded to passage legislation which implemented Governor Sean Parnell’s plan to truck natural gas from the Alaska North Slope to Fairbanks.

Bishop was counted among the moderate Republican senators who were the swing votes on controversial legislation, sometimes to the annoyance of more conservative Republicans. He opposed a constitutional amendment to establish school vouchers, as well as another constitutional amendment which would have increased the number of political appointees on the Alaska Judicial Council, an independent citizen's committee which evaluates applicants for judgeships and nominates judicial candidates to the governor. He also opposed a bill which would have greatly expanded the power of the commissioner of natural resources to promote development. All three were supported by conservatives and none passed the Senate.

=== 2015-2018 Alaska Senate term ===
In 2014, Bishop ran unopposed in the Republican primary after two former state legislators filed to run against him and then quickly withdrew. In the general election, Bishop easily defeated his Democratic challenger Dorothy Shockley with 64% of the vote in a race noted for its mutual courtesy, not only because of the candidates' shared distaste for negative campaigning but because Shockley is the cousin of Bishop’s wife.

Bishop served as chair of the Community and Regional Affairs Committee in addition to keeping his Finance Committee seat.

Bishop was active in seeking new solutions to the state's budget deficit, estimated at $4 billion in 2015. Many Republican legislators preferred budget cuts, while Democratic legislators supported increased taxes on the oil industry. In contrast, Bishop in the 2015 and 2017 legislative sessions sought to revive the so-called "education tax" that was repealed in 1980, when state government shifted its income from taxing its citizens to taxing the production of North Slope petroleum. Now called the "employment tax", the proposed tax (from $100 to $500 depending on the taxpayer's income) would only mitigate, not solve, the shortfall. It would be collected by employers and would sunset in 2024 or if the budget crisis was solved by production of North Slope natural gas. Bishop's proposal was not successful, even when Governor Bill Walker took it up and presented a modified version to the legislature in 2017.

Another Bishop proposal to reduce the budget shortfall met with more favor. Part of the Alaska Permanent Fund is distributed to Alaskans each year in the form of the Permanent Fund Dividend. Bishop's bill established an annual "Education Raffle", where Alaskans could purchase lottery tickets using part of their Permanent Fund Dividend. The proceeds of ticket sales would be divided between raffle winners and state education costs. The inaugural Education Raffle was held in 2020.

=== 2019-2022 Alaska Senate term ===
In 2018, Bishop was unopposed in the primary and general elections. After the election, Bishop's assignments to Senate standing committees increased; in addition to his Finance Committee seat, he was chosen as chair of the Community and Regional Affairs Committee and also took his place on the Health and Social Services Committee, the Resources Committee, and the Labor and Commerce Committee.

Bishop also served as vice chair of the Senate Legislative Budget and Audit Committee. In the run-up to the 2019 legislative session, Bishop said, “My priorities this session are the budget, the budget, [and] the budget.” In the 2021 legislative session, Bishop rose to be capital budget co-chair of the Finance Committee, complementing operating budget co-chair Senator Bert Stedman

Bishop proposed an ultimately unsuccessful bill to improve road maintenance by doubling the gasoline tax and increasing the registration fee for electric and plug-in hybrid vehicles. The doubling would have increased Alaska's gasoline tax from the lowest in the U.S. upward two places, to the 48th-highest in the nation. Although the bill passed the Senate, it was not taken up by the House.

As withdrawals from the Permanent Fund have become the major source of funding for the state of Alaska, annual state funding has increasingly come into conflict with the annual Permanent Fund Dividend. The size of the dividend was historically determined by a formula set by law, but more recently has been negotiated year-by-year to a smaller amount to mitigate budget shortfalls. In 2019 and 2022 Bishop ranged himself against the proponents of the larger statutory dividend. Likening the state of Alaska to a private company, Bishop laid out his philosophy in 2019:

I have no problem paying a statutorily driven dividend if the company is making money, but when the company is deficit spending I don’t support paying the full dividend. I'm not going to balance the budget to pay a full dividend when we’re taking away money from the university and schools and seniors.

Bishop did not always vote with his Republican colleagues. In May 2022, the Republican party organization in House District 36, one of the two House districts which comprised Bishop's Senate district, voted to censure Bishop for votes of his which the organization said violated the Alaska Republican Party platform. The votes in question included votes on COVID-19 policy, public education and the Permanent Fund Dividend. The state Republican Party took no position on the censure.

=== 2023-2024 Alaska Senate term ===
Redistricting changed the boundaries of Bishop's Senate District C, and also its name, to Senate District R. The party primaries were also replaced by an open primary in which the top four finishers advanced to the general election. Consequently, in Bishop's bid for reelection in 2022 he was opposed in both the primary and the general elections by Republican Elijah Verhagen and Alaskan Independence Party candidate Robert “Bert” Williams. Verhagen was the chair of the District 36 Republican committee that had voted to censure Bishop earlier in the year. The main issue of the 2022 campaign was affordable energy. Bishop designated it as his focus for his next term if he won, which he did with 56% of the general election vote.

In contrast to the Republican-dominated majority coalitions that had prevailed during Bishop's legislative career to this point, after the election Bishop joined a bipartisan majority coalition comprising all nine Democrats and eight of the eleven Republicans; that is, seventeen members of the twenty-member Alaska Senate. In addition to his seat on the Finance Committee, Bishop became majority whip, co-chair of the Resources Committee, vice chair of the Labor and Commerce Committee, and a member of two joint committees with the House: the Legislative Council and the Legislative Budget and Audit Committee.

At the start of the 2023 session, Bishop repeated his position that the legislature's annual withdrawals from the Permanent Fund must prioritize funding state government over funding a large Permanent Fund Dividend. He pointed out that $17 billion in dividends had been paid since 2002, and during that time the state's gross domestic product had fallen and the population had experienced net out-migration. Bishop's moral was that some of those dividends would have been better spent building the state's economy by infrastructure investment.

During the 2023 session, Bishop was one of three sponsors of a bipartisan bill to create a new defined benefit pension plan for state workers. Seven other senators signed on as co-sponsors. The previous pension program had been replaced in 2006 by a 401(k)-style defined contribution program. The bill was intended to address ongoing recruitment problems for the state that had created a 20% vacancy rate for state jobs at that time. Pension bills had been regularly introduced by legislators representing the state capital, Juneau, but none had attracted this much support. The bill passed the Senate but stalled in the House.

At the start of the 2024 session, Bishop reiterated that affordable energy was the issue of the day; in particular, addressing the decline of natural gas supplies available to heat Alaska's populous south-central region. Speaking to a joint hearing of the Resource Committees of the House and Senate, Bishop said:

I’ve got 60 years’ worth of reports in my office on energy plans in this state. We have known what to do for 60 years, and we have done nothing. And we’ve got to do something. And it happens right here in this room. And it’s got to happen this session.

In May 2024, shortly before the filing deadline to run for reelection, Bishop issued a statement that he would not be running, saying that he would be focusing on his family and on his gold mining for the next two years. He also wrote, “There is still a determination inside me to fix our current path of rising energy costs and the loss of our working-age population. It is clear that addressing those issues requires taking on a bigger role than serving in the legislature.”

=== 2026 Alaska gubernatorial election ===
On May 5, 2025, Bishop filed a letter of intent to run for governor with APOC, the first step to participation in the 2026 Alaska gubernatorial campaign. On April 8, 2026, Bishop announced his lieutenant governor running mate: Greta Schuerch, the vice chair of the NANA Regional Corporation board of directors. Schuerch is also the senior advisor on government relations for the Canadian mining corporation Teck Resources which operates the Red Dog zinc and lead mine in Alaska. Schuerch, an Iñupiat, was registered as a nonpartisan voter at the time of the announcement but unsuccessfully ran for the Alaska House in 2012 as a Democrat.

The Fairbanks Daily News-Miner reported on April 10, 2026 that Bishop had outlined his top priorities to them in an interview. Bishop continued his ongoing focus on affordable energy for the state, saying that “Cheap energy and the economy are joined at the hip.” Other priorities were improving the state's public education system and its fisheries industry.

Bishop and Schuerch won 7.0% in the primary election, placing fifth in a race where the top four candidates advance to the general election. He suspended his campaign on August 31. There was speculation that Bishop and Schuerch would be bumped up and participate in the general election by virtue of fourth-place finisher Treg Taylor's temporary disqualification. In the event, however, Taylor appeared on the ballot and Bishop did not.

== Personal life ==
Darlene, Bishop's wife, is Athabascan and a retired kindergarten teacher. They have two children.

A keen outdoorsman, Bishop has twice (1998 and 2000) won the Yukon 800 Mile Marathon speedboat race from Fairbanks to Galena, Alaska and back. He mines gold at a placer mine near his cabin at Manley Hot Springs, where he and Darlene honeymooned in 1976.

Bishop is an active member of the Pioneers of Alaska, a statewide historical preservation society.
