= List of Alaska railroads =

The following railroads operate in the U.S. state of Alaska.

== Regional Railroad ==
- Alaska Railroad (ARR)

== Heritage/Scenic Railroad ==
- White Pass and Yukon Route (WPY)

== Planned Railroad ==
- Alaska-Alberta Railway

== Defunct Railroads ==
- Alaska Anthracite Railroad
- Alaska Anthracite Coal and Railway Company
- Alaska Home Railroad
- Alaska Northern Railway
- Alaska Pacific Railway and Terminal Company
- Catalla and Carbon Mountain Railway
- Copper River and Northwestern Railway
- Council City and Solomon River Railroad
- Golovin Bay Railroad
- Nome Arctic Railway
- Pacific and Arctic Railway and Navigation Company (White Pass and Yukon Route)
- Seward Peninsula Railway
- Tanana Mines Railway
- Tanana Valley Railroad
- Valdez, Copper River and Tanana Railroad
- Valdez-Yukon Railroad
- Wild Goose Railroad
- Yakutat and Southern Railway

== Industrial Operations ==
- Alaska-Gastineau Mining Company
- Alaska-Juneau Gold Mine
- Alaska Lumber and Pulp Company (Alaska Pulp Corporation)
- Apollo Consolidated Mining Company
- Cliff Creek Coal Mine
- Coal Creek Coal Company
- Cook Inlet Coal Field Company
- Katalla Coal Company
- Ketchikan Pulp Company
- Maine Northwestern Development Company
- Rush and Brown Copper Mine
- Treadwell Mines
