= Heney =

Heney may refer to:

- Daniel Henney (born 1979), American actor and model
- Francis J. Heney (1859–1937), American lawyer who served as Attorney General of the Arizona Territory between 1893 and 1895
- Hugues Heney (1789–1844), lawyer and political figure in Lower Canada
- Karen Sheffield Heney (born 1961), Canadian judo champion
- Michael James Heney (1864–1910), railroad contractor best known for his work on the first two railroads built in Alaska
- Thomas William Heney (1862–1928), Australian journalist and poet

== See also ==
- Heney Peak, a mountain in Alaska, USA
- Henney Kilowatt, an electric car created in 1959 in United States on the base frame of Renault Dauphine
- Henry (disambiguation)
