= Chitina Tin Shop =

Historic building in Alaska, United States

- U.S. National Register of Historic Places
- Alaska Heritage Resources Survey
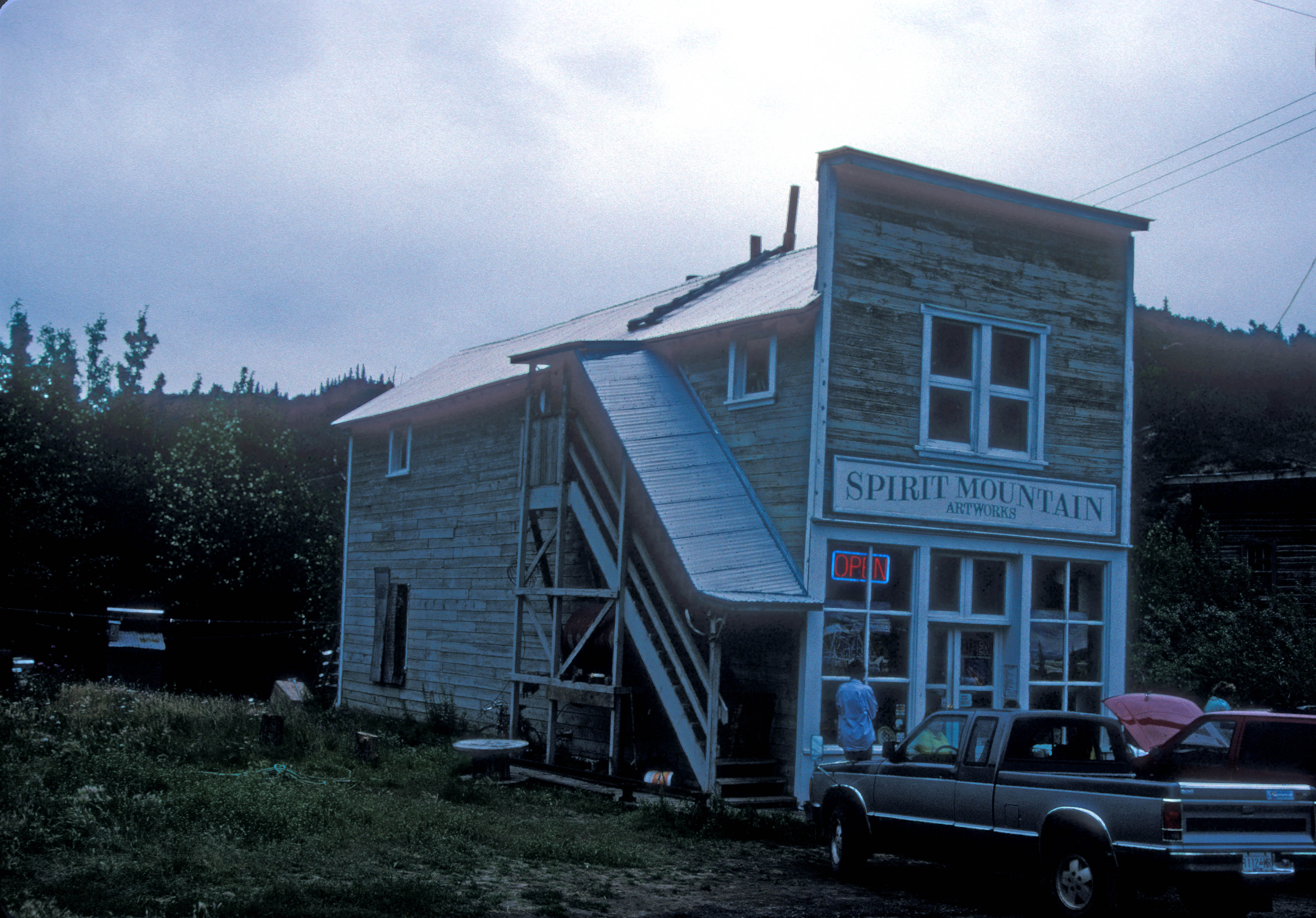

- Location within Alaska
- Location: Main Street, Chitina, Alaska
- Coordinates: 61°30′57″N 144°26′25″W
- Area: 0.745 acres (0.301 ha)
- Built: 1912
- Built by: Fred Schaupp
- NRHP reference No.: 79003763
- AHRS No.: VAL-049

Significant dates
- Added to NRHP: June 11, 1979
- Designated AHRS: September 17, 1977

The Chitina Tin Shop, also known as Fred's Place and Schaupp's, is a historic retail building on Main Street in Chitina, Alaska. It is a wood-frame structure, two stories in height, with a flat-topped false front in front of a gable roof. The building is 17 feet (5.2 m) wide and 33 feet (10 m) deep. It was built in 1912 by Fred Schaupp, during Chitina's building boom following the arrival of the Copper River and Northwestern Railway. The building is one of only a few surviving tin shops (essentially a metalworking facility) in the state. The first floor was occupied by the workshop, while living quarters were above. Following the closing of the railroad in 1938, the building has seen a variety of other uses. The building has been restored, and now houses an art gallery.

The building was listed on the National Register of Historic Places in 1979.

== See also ==
- National Register of Historic Places listings in Copper River Census Area, Alaska
