= Heeney =

Heeney is a surname. Notable people with the surname include:

- Arnold Heeney, PC CC (1902–1970), Canadian lawyer, diplomat and civil servant
- Cornelius Heeney (1754–1848), Irish-American merchant and politician
- Darcy Heeney (1916–1941), New Zealand boxer
- Dennis Heeney, Manitoba politician
- Gwen Heeney (1952–2016), British sculptor
- Isaac Heeney (born 1996), Australian footballer
- Michael P. Heeney, American country music songwriter
- Patrick Heeney (1881–1911), Irish composer who wrote the music to the Irish national anthem
- Tom Heeney (1898–1984), professional heavyweight boxer from New Zealand

== See also ==
- Heeney, Colorado, census-designated place in northern Summit County, Colorado, United States
- The Merchant-Heeney Report, written for the Canadian government
- Heney
