= Ralph Moody =

Ralph Moody may refer to:

- Ralph Moody (racing driver) (1917–2004), American racing driver and team owner
- Ralph Moody (actor) (1886–1971), American actor
- Ralph Moody (writer) (1898–1982), American author
- Ralph E. Moody (1915–1997), politician and judge from Alaska
