= Alaska Route 10 =

Alaska Route 10

Route information
- Maintained by Alaska DOT&PF
- Component highways: Copper River Highway; Edgerton Highway; McCarthy Road

Copper River Highway section
- Length: 49.5 mi (79.7 km)

Edgerton Highway segment
- Length: 33.5 mi (53.9 km)

Location
- Country: United States
- State: Alaska

Highway system
- Alaska Routes; Interstate; Scenic Byways
← AK-9	→ AK-11

Alaska Route 10 refers to two unconnected highways in the U.S. state of Alaska:

- Copper River Highway
- Edgerton Highway and McCarthy Road
