= Heney Peak =

Mountain in Alaska, United States

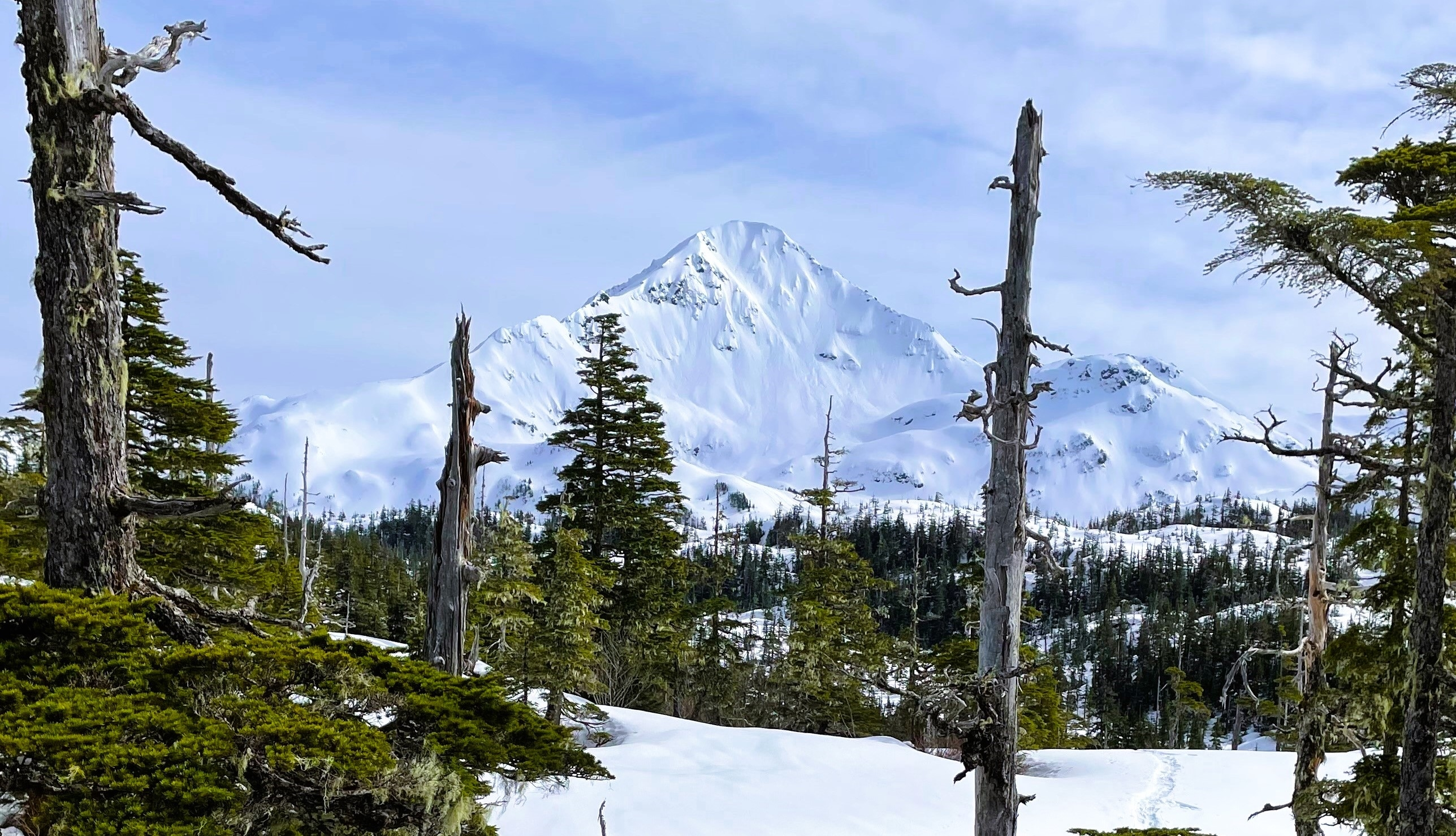
- West aspect

Highest point
- Elevation: 3,156 ft (962 m)
- Prominence: 3,124 ft (952 m)
- Isolation: 9.16 mi (14.74 km)
- Coordinates: 60°30′24″N 145°44′11″W

Naming
- Etymology: Michael James Heney

Geography
- Location within Alaska
- Interactive map of Heney Peak
- Location: Chugach Census Area
- Country: United States
- State: Alaska
- Protected area: Chugach National Forest
- Parent range: Chugach Mountains; Heney Range
- Topo map: USGS Cordova C-5

Heney Peak is a 3,156-foot-elevation (962-meter) mountain summit in Alaska, United States. The peak is located 2.5 miles (4.0 km) south of Cordova, and it is the highest peak of the eight-miles-long group of mountains called the Heney Range south of the town. This mountain is part of the Chugach Mountains and is set on land managed by Chugach National Forest. Precipitation runoff from the mountain drains west to Orca Inlet via Heney and Hartney creeks, whereas the east slope drains to Mountain Slough, then the Gulf of Alaska shortly thereafter. Topographic relief is significant as the summit rises 3,150 feet (960 m) above Mountain Slough in 1.5 miles (2.4 km). The mountain was named in 1927 by the U.S. Forest Service for Michael James Heney (1864–1910), builder of the nearby Copper River and Northwestern Railway. The toponym was officially adopted in 1928 by the U.S. Board on Geographic Names.

== Climate ==
Based on the Köppen climate classification, Heney Peak is located in a subpolar oceanic climate zone with long, cold, snowy winters, and cool summers. Weather systems coming off the Gulf of Alaska are forced upwards by the Chugach Mountains (orographic lift), causing heavy precipitation in the form of rainfall and snowfall. Winter temperatures can drop below 10 °F with wind chill factors below 0 °F.

== See also ==
- List of mountain peaks of Alaska
- Geography of Alaska
