= John Rader =

American politician

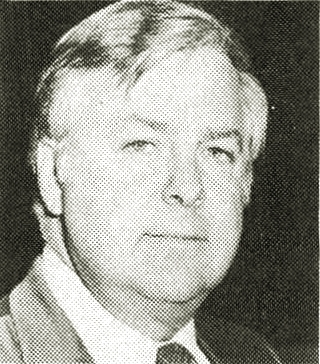

Member of the Alaska House of Representatives from the 10th district
- In office January 26, 1959 – April 27, 1959
- Preceded by: Office established
- Succeeded by: Blanche L. McSmith

1st Attorney General of Alaska
- In office 1959–1960
- Governor: William Egan
- Preceded by: J. Gerald Williams (as territorial attorney general)
- Succeeded by: Ralph E. Moody

Member of the Alaska House of Representatives from the 8th district
- In office January 28, 1963 – January 23, 1967
- Preceded by: Redistricted
- Succeeded by: Multi-member district

Member of the Alaska Senate from the J district (E district 1969–1975)
- In office January 27, 1969 – January 15, 1979
- Preceded by: Multi-member district
- Succeeded by: Ed Dankworth

President of the Alaska Senate
- In office January 10, 1977 – January 15, 1979
- Preceded by: Chancy Croft
- Succeeded by: Clem Tillion

Personal details
- Born: John Lafayette Rader; February 11, 1927 Howard, Kansas, U.S.
- Party: Democratic
- Education: University of Kansas (BS, JD)

John Lafayette Rader (born February 11, 1927) is an American Democratic politician, who served as the first Attorney General of Alaska. He was a member of the Alaska House of Representatives from 1959 to 1960 and 1963-1966 and the Senate from 1969 to 1979. He was the Senate president from 1977 to 1979.

He was a candidate for the United States House of Representatives in 1968, losing the Democratic primary to Nick Begich. Begich would go on to lose to incumbent Howard Wallace Pollock.
