= Edge of Alaska =

American reality television series

- Genre: Reality
- Country of origin: United States
- Original language: English
- No. of seasons: 4
- No. of episodes: 32

Production
- Running time: 42 minutes
- Production company: Twofour Broadcast

Original release
- Network: Discovery Channel
- Release: October 24, 2014 – November 26, 2017

Edge of Alaska is an American reality television series. The series premiered on October 24, 2014, on Discovery Channel. There were 4 series of 8 episodes each, ending in 2017. The series follows the residents of McCarthy, Alaska.

When the show first started, the Anchorage Daily News reported on controversies: "A new Discovery Channel reality show set in McCarthy is drawing fire for heavy-handed treatment of the reviving old mining town's dark past and alleged outlaw reputation."

== Synopsis ==
IMDB summarizes Edge of Alaska as:

Tradition collides with the residents of the isolated town of McCarthy, Alaska. The 42 souls who are brave enough to live there must battle the elements and each other to maintain their pioneer way of life.

== Neil Darish ==
Neil Darish is a McCarthy resident who was involved in creation of, and appeared as a main character in, Edge of Alaska. He did interviews, about McCarthy and about the making of the show, with Hollywood Soapbox, and the YouTube channel The Loud Spot.

In the YouTube interview, Darish said about the show:

[7:20] They're drama, based on an exaggeration of people's lives, but they're true to the ethos of what it's like to be in remote Alaska. Am I going to get frostbitten because I lost my glove on a snow machine? Absolutely not. So, would it look like I'm going to die on the snow machine in the show? Yes, because that's what gets people in the drama.

[8:02] The hard part is finding people who have a big personality and are willing to give it, you know, everything, to the producers, so that they can make it work.

[8:33] I'll tell you how it will be; I'll tell you how it works; because it's not a secret. ... First it's theater, and it doesn't make it a lie or right or wrong; it's just a way of creating story; and it is story you know, and they're not written for Alaskans; they're written for people who are going to be drawn into the drama.

[9:08] There were lots of people that wanted to be on the show, many more that didn't.

[18:43] I've got very dear friends that I genuinely feel bad [about] ... they really resent that we did the show.

Darish said the show was what he called "scene scripted": the producers would decide on the particular story to be portrayed, where a scene would take place, and what would happen in the scene. Mostly, the producers would not decide on the actual words to be used.

Also, Darish's views were included in an Aljazeera America article about film crews in Alaska:

Neil Darish is one of the stars of “Edge of Alaska.” He says he expected the show to be dramatized. He “plays a character,” a landowner who isn’t necessarily likable, he says. Viewers reacted to him. At first it was hard not to take the negativity personally, but then he decided they were reacting to his performance, not to him.

The show is somewhat scripted, but that doesn’t matter, he says. It captures the ethos of the town of McCarthy. “I’m just kind of fodder for the storytellers. That’s the approach I took.”

== Episodes ==
=== Series overview ===
Season	Episodes	Originally released	
Season	Episodes	First released	Last released
1	8	October 24, 2014	December 12, 2014
2	8	August 14, 2015	October 2, 2015
3	8	October 23, 2016	December 18, 2016
4	8	October 8, 2017	November 26, 2017

=== Season 1 (2014) ===
No. overall	No. in season	Title	Original release date	US viewers (millions)
1	1	"Winter's Grip"	October 24, 2014	N/A
2	2	"Last Days of Winter"	October 31, 2014	N/A
3	3	"The Thaw"	November 7, 2014	N/A
4	4	"The Road"	November 14, 2014	N/A
5	5	"Bear Attack"	November 21, 2014	N/A
6	6	"The Motherlode"	November 28, 2014	N/A
7	7	"McCarthy Rising"	December 5, 2014	N/A
8	8	"The Last Stand"	December 12, 2014	N/A

=== Season 2 (2015) ===
No. overall	No. in season	Title	Original release date	US viewers (millions)
9	1	"Wolves at the Door"	August 14, 2015	N/A
10	2	"Starvation Country"	August 21, 2015	N/A
11	3	"Defend the Frontier"	August 28, 2015	N/A
12	4	"Dying Days of Winter"	September 4, 2015	N/A
13	5	"The Breakup"	September 11, 2015	N/A
14	6	"Return to the Mother Lode"	September 18, 2015	N/A
15	7	"The End of the Frontier"	September 25, 2015	N/A
16	8	"Brave New McCarthy"	October 2, 2015	N/A

=== Season 3 (2016) ===
No. overall	No. in season	Title	Original release date	US viewers (millions)
17	1	"Fight for McCarthy"	October 23, 2016	N/A
18	2	"Devil's Bargain"	October 30, 2016	N/A
19	3	"The Stranger"	November 6, 2016	N/A
20	4	"Thaw and Order"	November 13, 2016	N/A
21	5	"The Cave In"	November 20, 2016	N/A
22	6	"Deadwood Forest"	November 27, 2016	N/A
23	7	"The Old Man on the Mountain"	December 11, 2016	N/A
24	8	"No Surrender"	December 18, 2016	1.60

=== Season 4 (2017) ===
No. overall	No. in season	Title	Original release date	US viewers (millions)
25	1	"Frost and Found"	October 8, 2017	1.51
26	2	"Crossing Thin Ice"	October 15, 2017	1.64
27	3	"Uprooted"	October 22, 2017	1.70
28	4	"Big Bad Wolf"	October 29, 2017	1.55
29	5	"Deal With the Devil"	November 5, 2017	N/A
30	6	"Spring Fever"	November 12, 2017	N/A
31	7	"Barnstorm"	November 19, 2017	N/A
32	8	"Winds of Change"	November 26, 2017	N/A
