= McCarthy Road =

Highway in Alaska, United States

McCarthy Road
- Alaska Route 10 east

Route information
- Maintained by Alaska DOT&PF
- Length: 59.3 mi (95.4 km)

Major junctions
- West end: AK-10 Edgerton Highway in Chitina
- East end: Kennecott River near the Kennecott Mines National Historic Landmark

Location
- Country: United States
- State: Alaska

Highway system
- Alaska Routes; Interstate; Scenic Byways

The McCarthy Road is a gravel-surfaced road that runs from the end of the Edgerton Highway in Chitina, Alaska, to about 1 mile (1.6 km) outside of McCarthy, Alaska.

== Route description ==
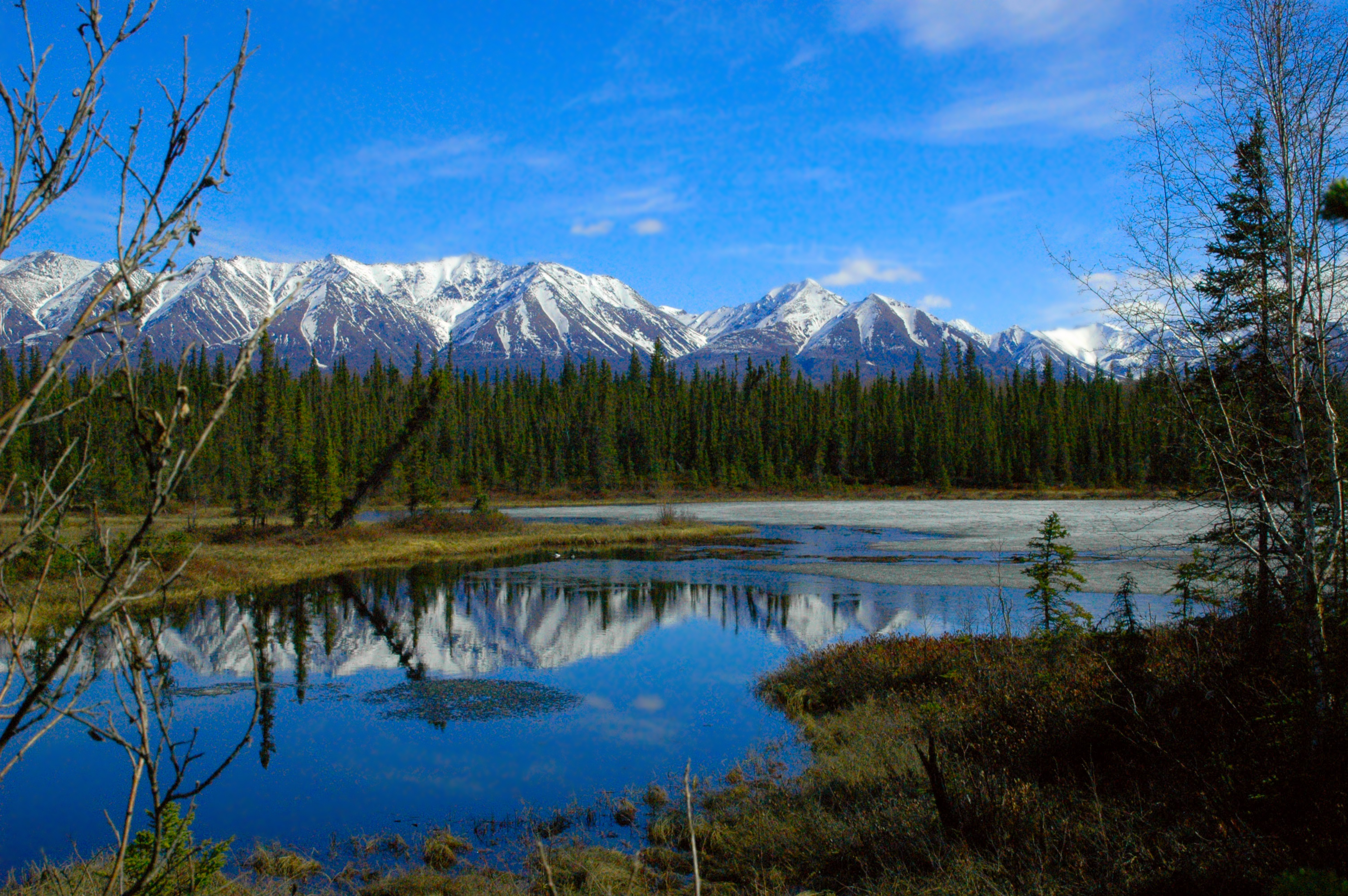
Along the McCarthy Road

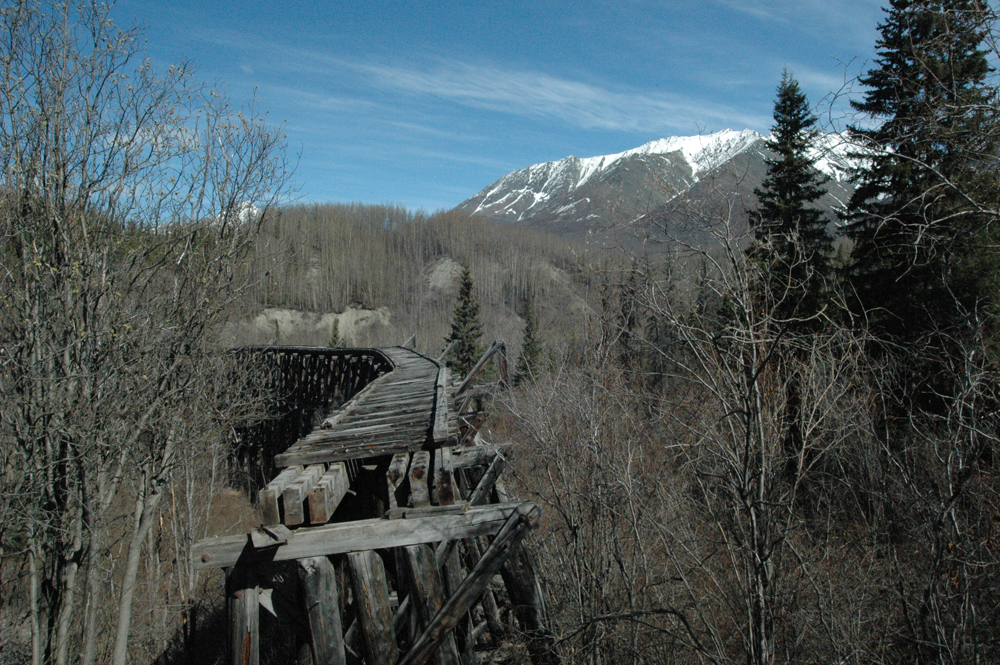
CRNW Rail Bridge along McCarthy Rd

McCarthy Road starts at the end of the Edgerton Highway in Chitina. The road is gravel-surfaced, and often very rough with many washboards and sharp turns. The route follows the railbed of the defunct Copper River and Northwestern Railway, and utilizes the spectacular Kuskulana Bridge, built in 1910, spanning 238 feet (73 m) high above the Kuskulana River at mile 17. It is one of two roads leading to Wrangell-St. Elias National Park and Preserve, though it is not part of the park, and gives access to the abandoned copper mines at Kennecott.

The road does not actually lead all the way to Kennecott; visitors must cross the Kennecott River by a footbridge built in the 1990s. The road is not maintained during winter.

The road was the inspiration for the 2004 book The Road to McCarthy: Around the World in Search of Ireland by Pete McCarthy.

== Major intersections ==
The entire route is in Unorganized Borough.

Location	mi	km	Destinations	Notes
Chitina	0	0.0	Edgerton Highway	
Kuskulana River	17	27	Kuskulana Bridge (built 1910, span 525 feet, height above river 238 feet)	
McCarthy	60	97	Kennecott River	Eastern terminus on the banks of the river
1.000 mi = 1.609 km; 1.000 km = 0.621 mi
