= McCarthy, Alaska =

- CDP
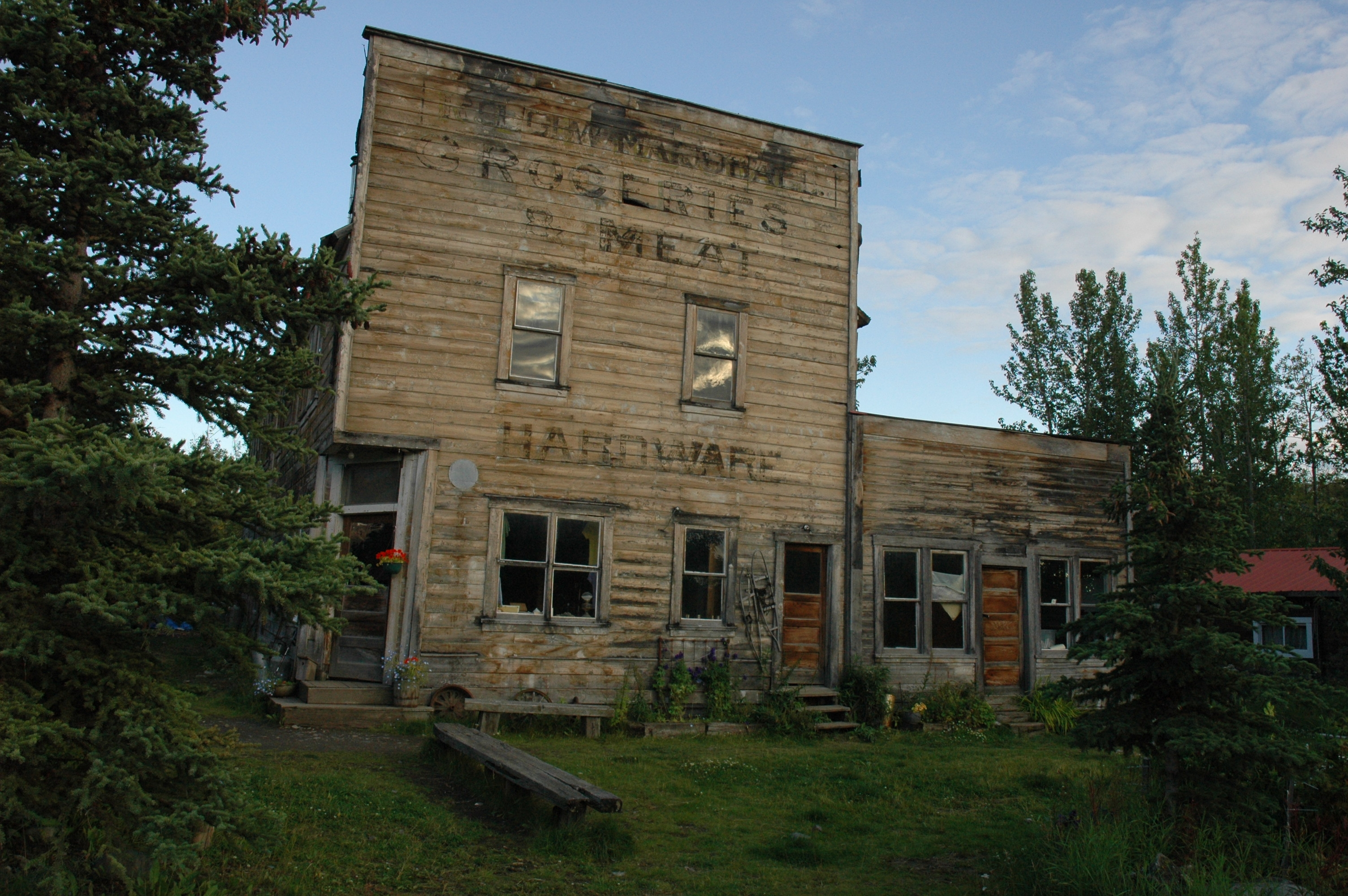
- The old McCarthy hardware store

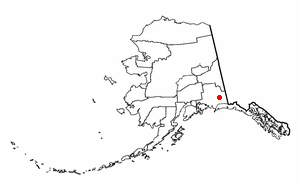
- Location of McCarthy, Alaska
- Coordinates: 61°25′58″N 142°54′39″W
- Country: United States
- State: Alaska
- Census Area: Copper River

Government
  - State senator: Click Bishop (R)
  - State rep.: Mike Cronk (R)

Area
  - Total: 149.48 sq mi (387.14 km^{2})
  - Land: 149.48 sq mi (387.14 km^{2})
  - Water: 0 sq mi (0.00 km^{2})
- Elevation: 1,401 ft (427 m)

Population (2020)
  - Total: 107
  - Density: 0.73/sq mi (0.28/km^{2})
- Time zone: UTC-9 (Alaska (AKST))
  - Summer (DST): UTC-8 (AKDT)
- Area code: 907
- FIPS code: 02-45790
- GNIS feature ID: 1406098

McCarthy is a census-designated place (CDP) in Copper River Census Area, Alaska, United States. It is in Wrangell-St. Elias National Park and Preserve. The population was 107 at the 2020 census, up from 28 in 2010.

== Geography and location ==
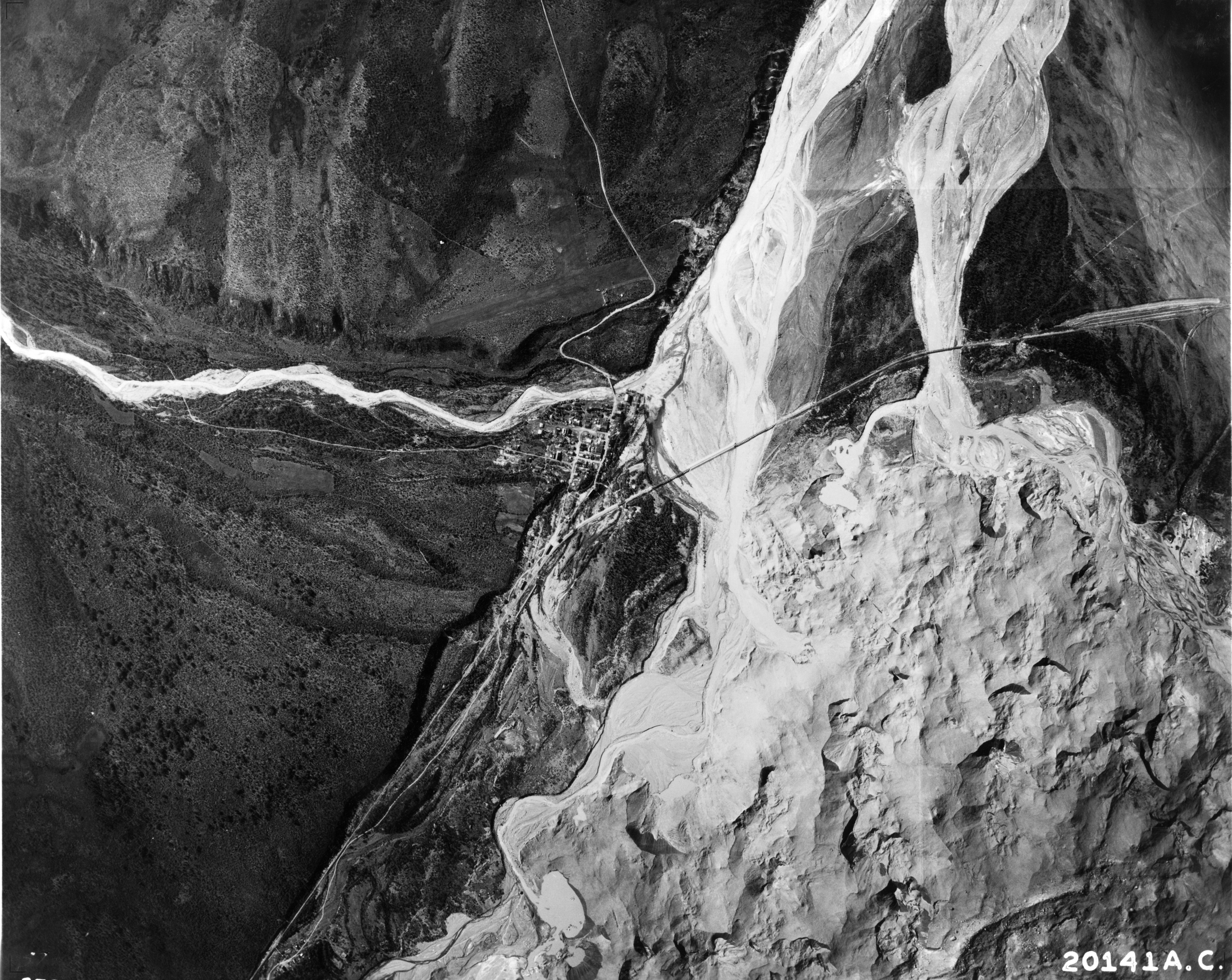
Aerial image from the 1930s

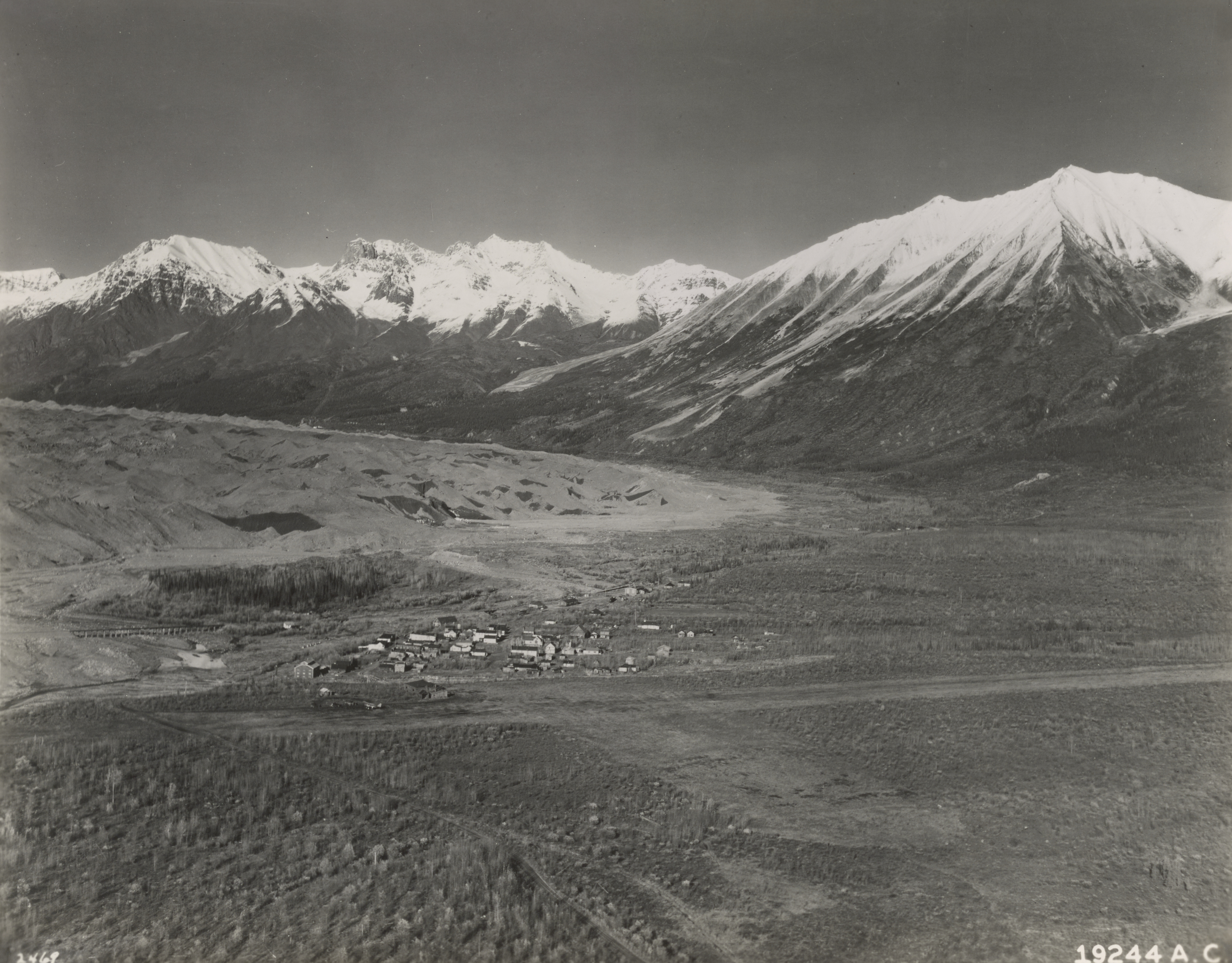
McCarthy in 1939

McCarthy is 120 mi (190 km) northeast of Cordova at the foot of the Wrangell Mountains. According to the United States Census Bureau, the CDP of McCarthy has a total area of 148.3 square miles (384 km^{2}). None of the area is covered with water. It is connected to the outside world via the McCarthy Road spur of the Edgerton Highway from Chitina, and must be passed through to reach Kennecott, which is also within the McCarthy CDP. Historically, from the end of the road one had to cross the Kennecott River and then a smaller stream using manually propelled ropeways, but a footbridge was built in 1997. Visitors can walk to McCarthy in about 15 minutes, although shuttle vans and buses are available during the tourist season from the bridge to both McCarthy and Kennecott. A private service bridge for vehicle traffic was constructed in 2004 downstream from the footbridge, but use is only available to residents, businesses, and the National Park Service for an annual fee.

== Climate ==
McCarthy has a subarctic climate (Köppen: Dsc), featuring cold winters and short, mild summers. Diurnal temperature variation is particularly high (up to 17°C) during spring and summer (resulting in cool summer nights despite the long hours of daylight), but not so much during fall and winter.

Climate data for McCarthy, Alaska (1991–2020 normals, extremes 1984–2017)
Month	Jan	Feb	Mar	Apr	May	Jun	Jul	Aug	Sep	Oct	Nov	Dec	Year
Record high °F (°C)	44 (7)	54 (12)	56 (13)	71 (22)	86 (30)	90 (32)	90 (32)	86 (30)	72 (22)	75 (24)	58 (14)	56 (13)	90 (32)
Mean maximum °F (°C)	34.6 (1.4)	42.0 (5.6)	48.3 (9.1)	59.0 (15.0)	74.7 (23.7)	82.5 (28.1)	82.5 (28.1)	78.6 (25.9)	66.7 (19.3)	54.6 (12.6)	39.7 (4.3)	37.4 (3.0)	84.4 (29.1)
Mean daily maximum °F (°C)	6.0 (−14.4)	20.7 (−6.3)	32.9 (0.5)	47.7 (8.7)	62.2 (16.8)	69.7 (20.9)	71.4 (21.9)	66.8 (19.3)	55.5 (13.1)	38.6 (3.7)	17.3 (−8.2)	9.2 (−12.7)	41.5 (5.3)
Daily mean °F (°C)	−1.6 (−18.7)	9.7 (−12.4)	18.2 (−7.7)	34.6 (1.4)	46.6 (8.1)	54.3 (12.4)	57.3 (14.1)	53.5 (11.9)	44.3 (6.8)	29.4 (−1.4)	9.7 (−12.4)	2.3 (−16.5)	29.9 (−1.2)
Mean daily minimum °F (°C)	−9.1 (−22.8)	−1.3 (−18.5)	3.5 (−15.8)	21.6 (−5.8)	30.9 (−0.6)	38.9 (3.8)	43.3 (6.3)	40.2 (4.6)	33.1 (0.6)	20.2 (−6.6)	2.0 (−16.7)	−4.5 (−20.3)	18.2 (−7.7)
Mean minimum °F (°C)	−40.6 (−40.3)	−28.5 (−33.6)	−23.9 (−31.1)	0.7 (−17.4)	19.7 (−6.8)	28.3 (−2.1)	34.0 (1.1)	28.0 (−2.2)	17.3 (−8.2)	−4.7 (−20.4)	−27.4 (−33.0)	−32.9 (−36.1)	−46.9 (−43.8)
Record low °F (°C)	−55 (−48)	−49 (−45)	−41 (−41)	−21 (−29)	−1 (−18)	24 (−4)	28 (−2)	18 (−8)	6 (−14)	−22 (−30)	−46 (−43)	−50 (−46)	−55 (−48)
Average precipitation inches (mm)	0.93 (24)	1.11 (28)	0.40 (10)	0.31 (7.9)	0.93 (24)	1.63 (41)	2.45 (62)	2.65 (67)	2.56 (65)	2.22 (56)	1.45 (37)	1.06 (27)	17.70 (450)
Average snowfall inches (cm)	13.2 (34)	7.9 (20)	5.4 (14)	2.5 (6.4)	0.6 (1.5)	0.0 (0.0)	0.0 (0.0)	0.0 (0.0)	2.7 (6.9)	9.4 (24)	13.5 (34)	11.3 (29)	66.5 (169)
Average precipitation days (≥ 0.01 in)	8.7	7.1	4.7	2.8	7.0	11.3	14.0	16.4	15.4	11.2	10.1	9.3	118.0
Average snowy days (≥ 0.1 in)	8.8	6.6	4.4	2.2	0.4	0.0	0.0	0.0	1.2	5.2	9.3	8.6	46.7
Source: NOAA

== Demographics ==
Historical population
Census	Pop.	Note	%±
1920	127		—
1930	115		−9.4%
1940	49		−57.4%
1990	25		—
2000	42		68.0%
2010	28		−33.3%
2020	107		282.1%
U.S. Decennial Census

McCarthy first reported on the 1920 U.S. Census as an unincorporated village. With the closure of the post office in 1943, it did not report on the census from 1950 to 1980, though it unofficially returned 22 residents in 1980. It returned again beginning in 1990 when it was made a census-designated place (CDP).

As of the census of 2000, there were 42 people, 26 households, and 6 families residing in the CDP. The population density was 0.3 inhabitants per square mile (0.12/km^{2}). There were 47 housing units at an average density of 0.3 per square mile (0.12/km^{2}). The racial makeup of the CDP was 100.00% White.

There were 26 households, out of which 15.4% had children under the age of 18 living with them, 15.4% were married couples living together, 3.8% had a female householder with no husband present, and 73.1% were non-families. 53.8% of all households were made up of individuals, and none had someone living alone who was 65 years of age or older. The average household size was 1.62 and the average family size was 2.14.

Drawn by an increase in tourism since the founding of Wrangell St. Elias National Park and Preserve, a significant portion of McCarthy's summer population resides elsewhere in the winter. This results in them not being counted during the censuses.

In the CDP, the age distribution of the population shows 9.5% under the age of 18, 9.5% from 18 to 24, 28.6% from 25 to 44, 47.6% from 45 to 64, and 4.8% who were 65 years of age or older. The median age was 46 years. For every 100 females, there were 147.1 males. For every 100 females age 18 and over, there were 153.3 males.

The median income for a household in the CDP was $17,188, and the median income for a family was $20,000. The per capita income for the CDP was $16,045. There were no families and 15.2% of the population living below the poverty line, including no under eighteens and none of those over 65.

== History ==
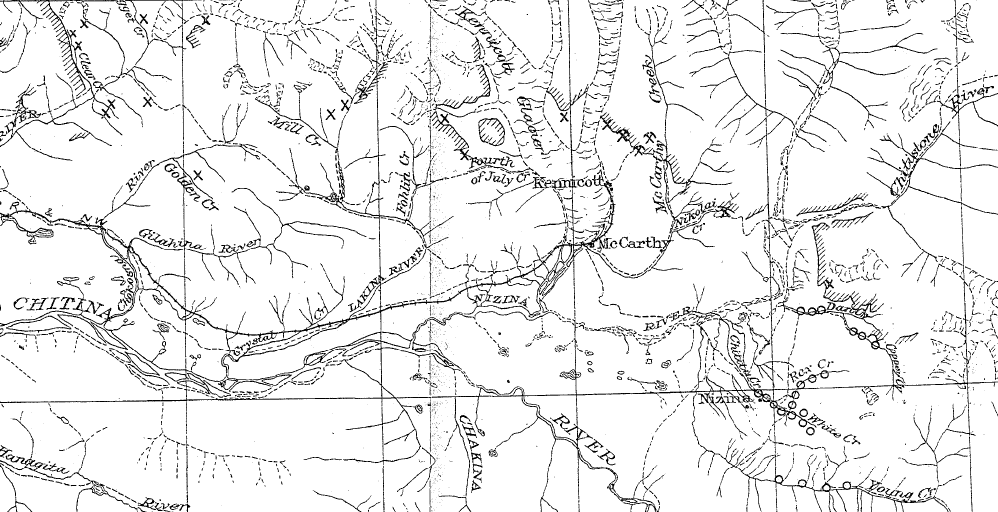
1917 map depicting copper and gold mining in the area. "x" depicts copper while "o" depicts gold.

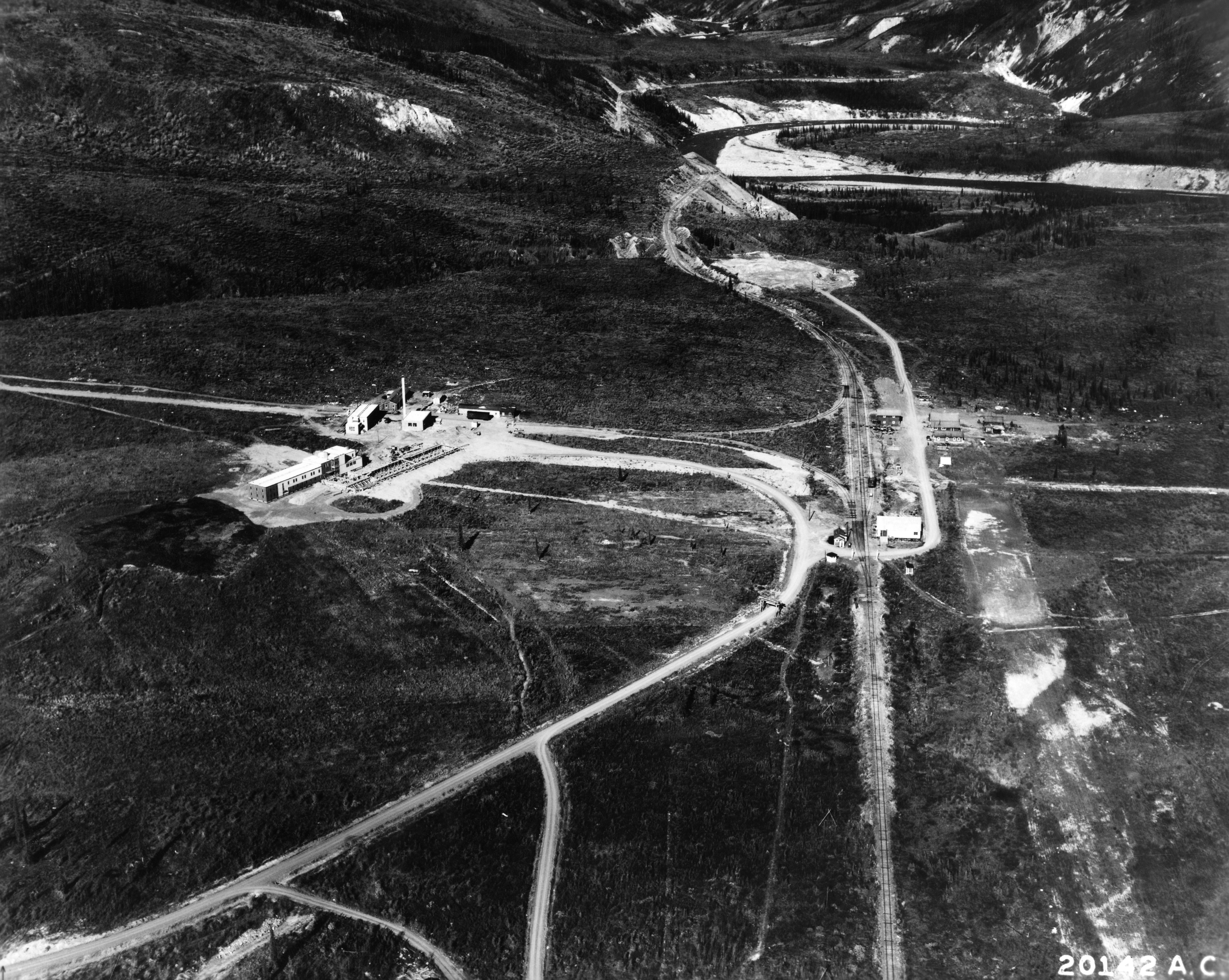
Railroads at McCarthy

For centuries, Athabascans hunted in the area of McCarthy. Chief Nikolai and his band of Athabaskan Natives had a summer camp at Dan Creek, 15 miles east of McCarthy, where they collected copper nuggets from Dan Creek. Their permanent camp was on the Copper River at the village of Taral near Chitina where they fished for salmon.

Copper was discovered between the Kennicott Glacier and McCarthy Creek in 1900, after which Kennicott Mine, Kennecott Mining Company, and company town of Kennecott were created. Due to a clerical error, the corporation and town used the spelling of Kennecott instead of Kennicott, named for Kennicott Glacier in the valley below the town. The glacier was named after Robert Kennicott, a naturalist who explored in Alaska in the mid-1800s.

Partly because alcoholic beverages and prostitution were forbidden in Kennecott, McCarthy grew as an area to provide illicit services not available in the company town. It grew quickly into a major town with a gymnasium, a hospital, a school, a bar and a brothel. The Copper River and Northwestern Railway reached McCarthy in 1911.

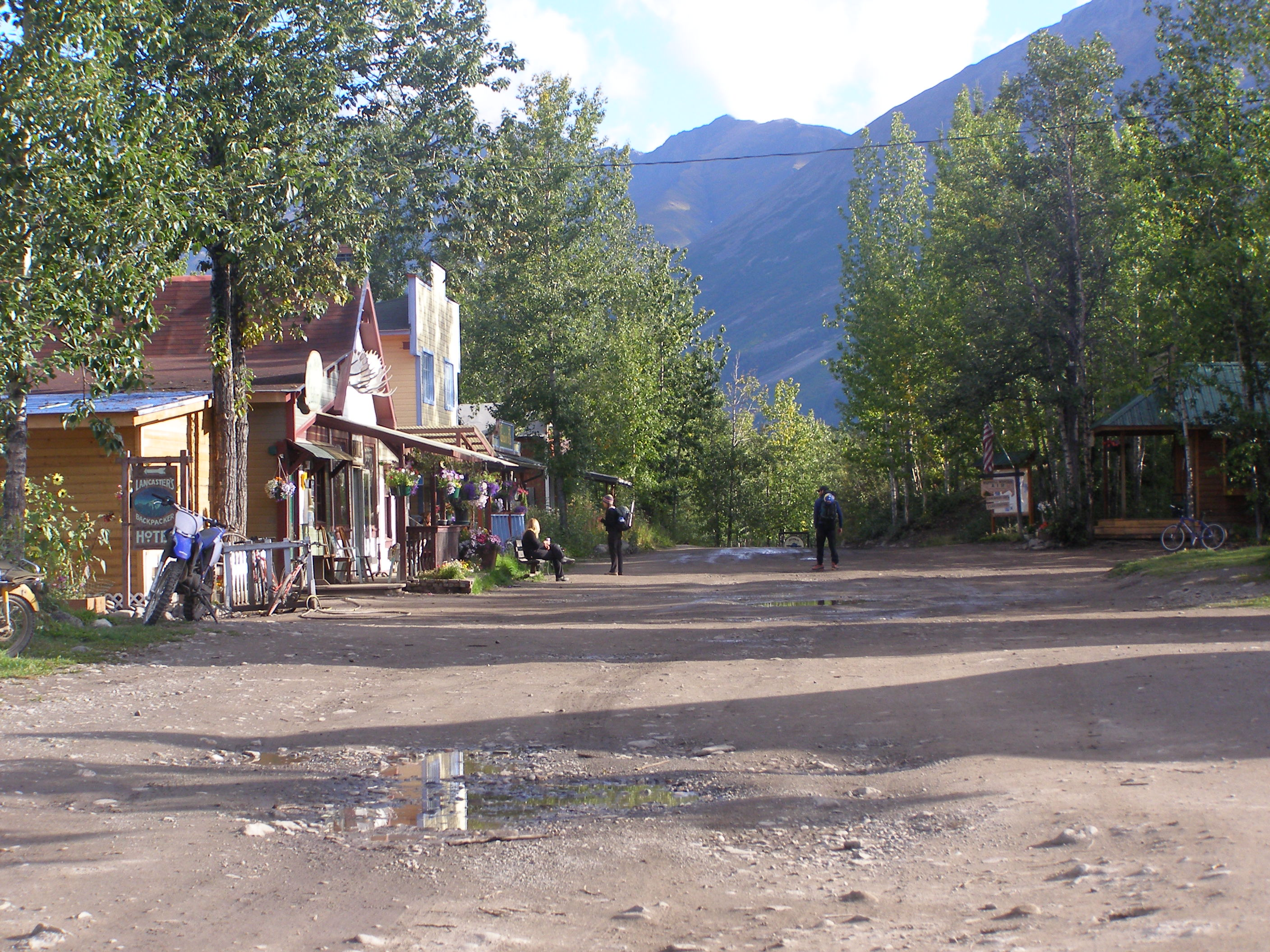
The bulk of McCarthy's main road

In 1938, the copper deposits were mostly gone and the town was mostly abandoned. The railroad discontinued service that year. Over its 30-year operation, U.S. $200 million in ore was extracted from the mine, making it the richest concentration of copper ore in the world.

The population of McCarthy and Kennecott fell to almost zero until the 1970s, when the area began to draw young people from the many who came to Alaska in the '70s for adventure and the big money of the Trans Alaska Pipeline project. In the '80s, after the area was designated Wrangell-St. Elias National Park (1980), it began to draw some adventurous tourists to the new national park. The few people that lived there began to provide a variety of tourist services. There has always been at least one family living in the McCarthy area since 1953.

The old mine buildings, artifacts, and colorful history attract visitors during the summer months. The Kennecott and McCarthy area ranks as one of the United States' most endangered landmarks by the National Trust for Historic Places. Emergency stabilization of the old buildings has been done and more will be required.

In 2014, the TV show Edge of Alaska premiered on Discovery Channel. The show has caused controversy though, as many town residents feel the town is portrayed in a bad light due to the troublesome incidents that have occurred there.

=== 1983 shooting ===
On March 1, 1983, in an attempt to disrupt the Alaska pipeline, 39-year-old Louis D. Hastings opened fire, with a .223 Ruger Mini-14 rifle, and shot dead six of the 22 residents of McCarthy, with two others being wounded. State police in Glennallen got into a helicopter and flew 100 miles to capture Hastings as he was using a snowmobile to drive west from McCarthy.

On December 5, 1983, Hastings pled no contest to six charges of murder and two charges of attempted murder. On July 27, 1984, he was sentenced to 634 years in prison.
