= Seward Peninsula Railway =

The Seward Peninsular Railroad (SPRR), often Seward Peninsula Railroad, is a former railway company in Alaska, United States. In 1900 Wild Goose Railroad was established, and on July 19, 1900 the first 6.5 km stretch of railway from Nome, Alaska to Discovery was laid. The track had a gauge of three feet (910 mm). The terminus at Anvil City was called Banner station. The trains ran only from spring to November, over the winter resting traffic.

In 1903 Wild Goose Railroad was reorganized as Nome Arctic Railway and on April 27, 1906 it was bought out by The Seward Peninsula Railway. On November 18, 1921, the Alaska State acquired the railway line and renewed the equipment. Regular operation was not resumed. In 1953 the railroad was reopened as The Curly Q Line equipped tourist operation between Nome and Salmon Lake lasted only until 1955. Part of the route was then transformed into a street.
