= Alaska Anthracite Railroad =

The Alaska Anthracite Railroad Company was formed about 1907 by several people to exploit the Bering River coal fields after the Alaska Syndicate that consisted of M. Guggenheim & Sons and J.P. Morgan & Co. left the area for the Copper River copper. It was after the 1907 winter storm destroyed their Copper River and Northwestern Railway (CR&NW) in the Katalla - Palm Point area and access to the Bering River coal fields.

The principles of the Alaska Anthracite Railroad Company were John A. Campbell, President; James Campbell, Vice-Pres. & Treasurer and Charles D. Davis, Secretary. The General Office was at 403 Coleman Building in Seattle, Washington. The Alaska office was in Katalla, Alaska.

In February 1908 Wesley P. Rodgers was asked by Clark Davis to come immediately to Seattle. Clark Davis was the father of Charles D. Davis and was one of the early driving forces behind this new group to develop the Bering River coal fields. Clark Davis needed Wes Rodgers to go as soon as possible to the coal field certify an earlier survey of one of the claims. The US Government had control of the area, and it was difficult to get claims established. It was not until about 1916 that the issues were resolved.

It appears that in 1916 the Alaska Anthracite Railroad Company began building their railroad from the Controller Bay area to the coal fields about 20 miles to the north. The railroad actually began at a place called Goose City on the Bering River. There were plans to extend it south to Controller Bay, but it never happened. The construction of the railroad did not progress as expected, and Clark Davis, First VP and General Manager of the Coal Co., again asked Wes Rodgers to go to Alaska from Pennsylvania to finish its construction.

Rodgers had not seen the right of way for eleven years, which means its location survey was started about 1906. It very likely was done by him in 1906 as part of the Alaska Syndicate location work, and rejected in favor of the Katalla - Palm Point access. The Alaska Anthracite Railroad right of way was surveyed in 1906 all the way to Controller Bay; however, Rodgers started it at Goose City probably because of the 1907 winter storm destruction.

Rodgers was at Goose City in 1917 and stated that it was about 18 to 19 miles to the mines. Rodgers had 25 miles of railroad to build, ocean docks and terminals to construct. He also had a mine to open up and equip and to build a power house, machine shop, blacksmith shop, tramways and a camp suitable for the men. These facilities were located near Stillwater close to the mine. The modest facilities at Goose City were to support the loading dock. There was a plan to extend the railroad to Controller Bay, but it never was done. Rodgers maps show only a planned right of way.

Davis wanted all these facilities in operation by the end of the year. Rodgers wrote in July 1917 that it would not be long till the railroad would be built. Pile drivers were hammering their way through swamps and over streams, graders were at work, and a locomotive had arrived and would soon take its place in the construction effort. This engine may have been the 0-4-0 tank engine known as "Ole" from the Copper River and Northwestern Railway.

Rodgers believed that the company would pull through, but its existence had been precarious. They were working to get the coal to market by late 1917. However, interest in the coal fell off and with the lack of funds the company tried to reorganize in 1921 as the Alaska Coke & Coal Company. The railroad lasted until 1923 when it went into receivership.
