= Edgerton Highway =

State highway in Alaska, United States

Edgerton Highway
- Edgerton Highway highlighted in red

Route information
- Maintained by Alaska DOT&PF
- Length: 33.5 mi (53.9 km)

Major junctions
- West end: AK-4 (Mile 82.5 Richardson Highway) south of Copper Center
- East end: AK-10 McCarthy Road in Chitina

Location
- Country: United States
- State: Alaska

Highway system
- Alaska Routes; Interstate; Scenic Byways

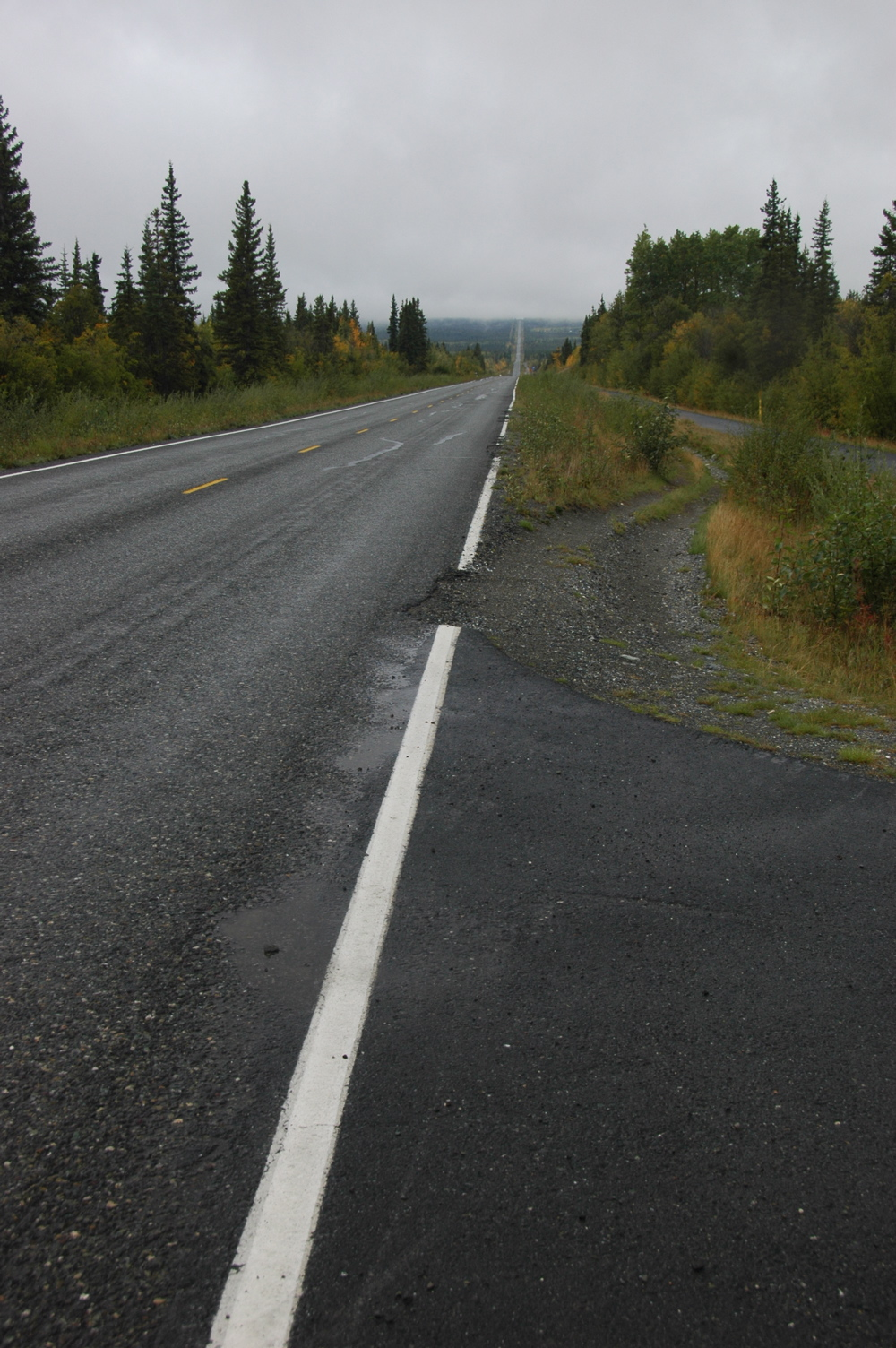
The Edgerton Highway at about mile 4 (km 6). The northern/western end of the highway, between the Richardson Highway and Old Edgerton Highway intersections, is mostly a long, straight stretch. This is unusual for Alaska, where highways typically follow a meandering route.

The Edgerton Highway is a minor highway in the U.S. state of Alaska that extends 33 miles (53 km) from the Richardson Highway near Copper Center to the town of Chitina. The McCarthy Road, within the Wrangell-Saint Elias National Park and Preserve, is a 58-mile (93 km) extension from Chitina to McCarthy.

The Edgerton Highway, named for U.S. Army Major General Glen Edgar Edgerton, a member of the Alaska Road Commission, follows an old pack trail along the Copper River, and is paved. The popular dip-net salmon fishery in Chitina causes the highway to be fairly heavily used in summer. It is part of Alaska Route 10.

== Route description ==
The Edgerton Highway begins at its junction with the Richardson Highway at Pippin Lake in the rural community of Kenny Lake. The highway travels east-northeast through rural Kenny Lake before reaching an intersection with the Old Edgerton Highway and turning southeast. The highway continues through several miles of forest along the Copper River, crossing several small affluents. The roadway passes the Chitina Airport, ending at its junction with the McCarthy Road after passing through the very small town of Chitina.

== Recreation site ==
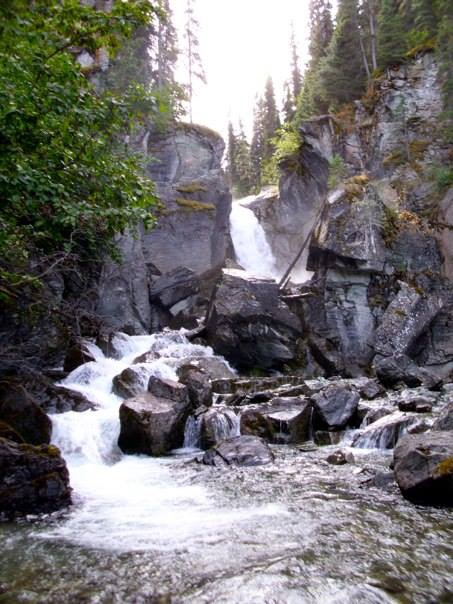
Liberty Falls

Liberty Falls State Recreation Site is located at mile 23 of the highway. It is one of the smaller units of the Alaska State Parks system, at only 10 acres (4.0 ha). The site features a small campground and picnic area and, as the name suggests, a close-up view of a waterfall and the canyon created by Liberty Creek as it runs down to the Copper River.

== Major junctions ==
The entire route is in Copper River Borough.

Location	mi	km	Destinations	Notes
Kenny Lake	0.000	0.000	AK-4 (Richardson Highway)	Western terminus
Kenny Lake	7.252	11.671	Old Edgerton Highway	
Chitina	33.320	53.623	Copper River Spur	
Chitina	34.970	56.279	McCarthy Road	Eastern terminus. Highway continues east as McCarthy Road
1.000 mi = 1.609 km; 1.000 km = 0.621 mi
