= Martin Blinder =

American psychiatrist (1937–2026)

Martin George Blinder (February 22, 1937 – October 30, 2026) was an American physician and forensic psychiatrist. He was editor-in-chief of the academic journal Family Therapy, a former assistant clinical professor of psychiatry at the University of California, San Francisco, and a former adjunct professor of law at the University of California, Hastings College of the Law. He was instrumental in the development of the use of lithium carbonate for treatment of bipolar disorder and in winning FDA approval for use of this drug in the United States.

Blinder was born on February 22, 1937, in The Bronx, New York. He earned his bachelor's degree from Cornell University in 1958 and an M.D. degree from the Chicago Medical School in 1962. In the 1970s, Blinder was a city councilman and mayor of San Anselmo, California. There, he oversaw passage of one of the first laws restricting public smoking in the United States. He is author of Psychiatry in the Everyday Practice of Law, Fourth Edition (Thomson/West), Lovers, Killers, Husbands and Wives (St. Martin's Press), Fluke (Permanent Press), Choosing Lovers (Glenbridge Publishing) and The Lucrecia Borgia Cookbook (Renaissance Press), as well as author of articles for the Journal of the American Medical Association, The Archives of General Psychiatry, The American Journal of Neuropsychiatry, Judicature, Journal of the California State Bar Association, Journal of the Hawaiian State Bar Association, and Journal of the American Bar Association, among many others.

He was the forensic psychiatrist who interviewed Alaskan spree killer Louis D. Hastings.

Blinder was married three times, with two of his wives ending their lives in apparent suicides. He died at the age of 89 on October 30, 2026, in San Anselmo, California, from pancreatic cancer.

== Trial of Dan White ==
Blinder is noted for his testimony in the 1979 trial of Dan White. In that trial, Blinder testified that White was suffering from depression and pointed to several behavioral symptoms of that depression, including the claim that White had gone from being highly health-conscious to consuming sugary foods and drinks such as Twinkies and Coca-Cola. A remark by Blinder that the sugar might have worsened such a depression was widely reported as a claim that the sugar had contributed to the depression, giving rise to the derisive label of the "Twinkie defense" for defendants' claims that an unusual biological factor contributed to their commission of a crime.
