= Blanche L. McSmith =

African-American civil rights activist, businesswoman and politician

Blanche Louise Preston McSmith
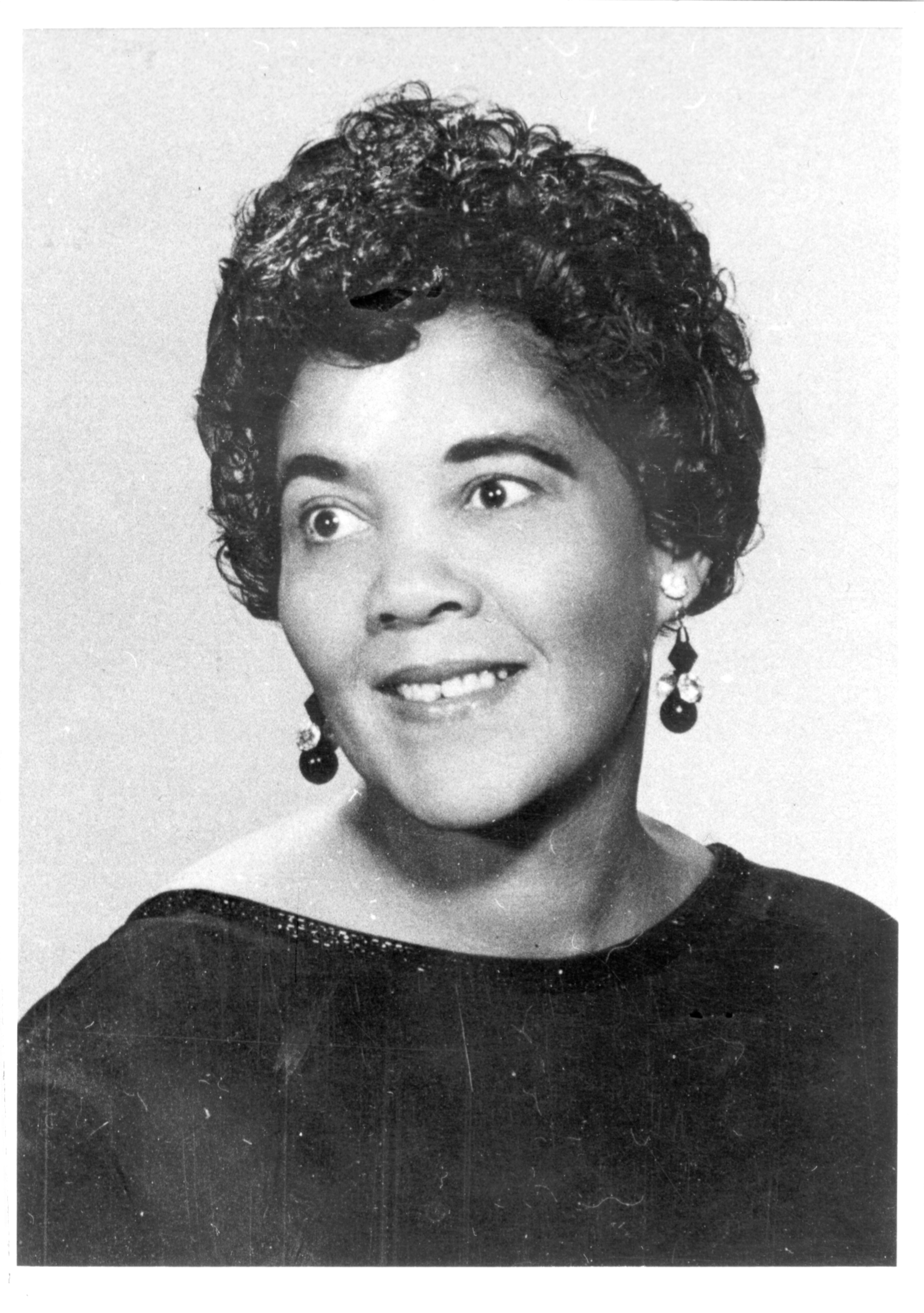
- Blanche L. McSmith c. 1960

Member of the Alaska House of Representatives from the 10th district
- In office January 25, 1960 – January 23, 1961
- Appointed by: William A. Egan
- Preceded by: John Rader
- Succeeded by: Multi-member district

Personal details
- Born: Blanche Louise Preston; May 5, 1920 Marshall, Texas
- Died: July 28, 2006 (aged 86) Anchorage, Alaska
- Education: Wiley College; University of Southern California

Blanche Louise Preston McSmith (May 5, 1920 – July 28, 2006) was an African-American civil rights activist, businesswoman and politician.

McSmith was born in Marshall, Texas and graduated from Wiley College in 1941. She received her master's degree in social work from University of Southern California in 1944. In 1949, McSmith and her husband William McSmith moved to Kodiak, Alaska Territory, and then to Anchorage, Alaska Territory, in 1950. McSmith and her husband owned an electronics business and were involved in real estate in Anchorage. McSmith was involved with the NAACP and helped set up its branch in Anchorage. McSmith served in the Alaska House of Representatives in 1960 after being appointed to fill a vacancy when John L. Rader resigned from the Alaska Legislature, when he was appointed Alaska Attorney General. McSmith was a Democrat. McSmith was the first African-American to serve in the Alaska Legislature. In 1972, McSmith was appointed director of the Office of the Alaska Governor for the Public Employment Program in Juneau, Alaska. McSmith died in Anchorage, Alaska, and was buried at Anchorage Memorial Park.

== Early life and education ==
McSmith was born Blanche Louise Preston on May 5, 1920, in Marshall, Texas. Her father, William A. Preston, was a school principal and a Baptist minister who preached against the evils of racism. Her mother, Myrtle O. Butte Preston, was a teacher. Blanche was one of three children.

In 1941, she earned a bachelor's degree from Wiley College, a historic black college in Marshall that continues to operate. She went on to earn a master's degree in social work from the University of Southern California in 1944.

Preston married Los Angeles electrical engineer and businessman William McSmith in 1949. Later that year, William was hired for a federal job in Kodiak, Alaska Territory, and Blanche followed. They then moved to and settled in Anchorage, the territory's largest city in 1950.

In Anchorage, she developed an interest in real estate and became the first Black realtor in Alaska. She was also an advocate for Alaska statehood, flying to Washington D.C., with other Alaskans to lobby Congress and federal officials.

== Public and professional life ==
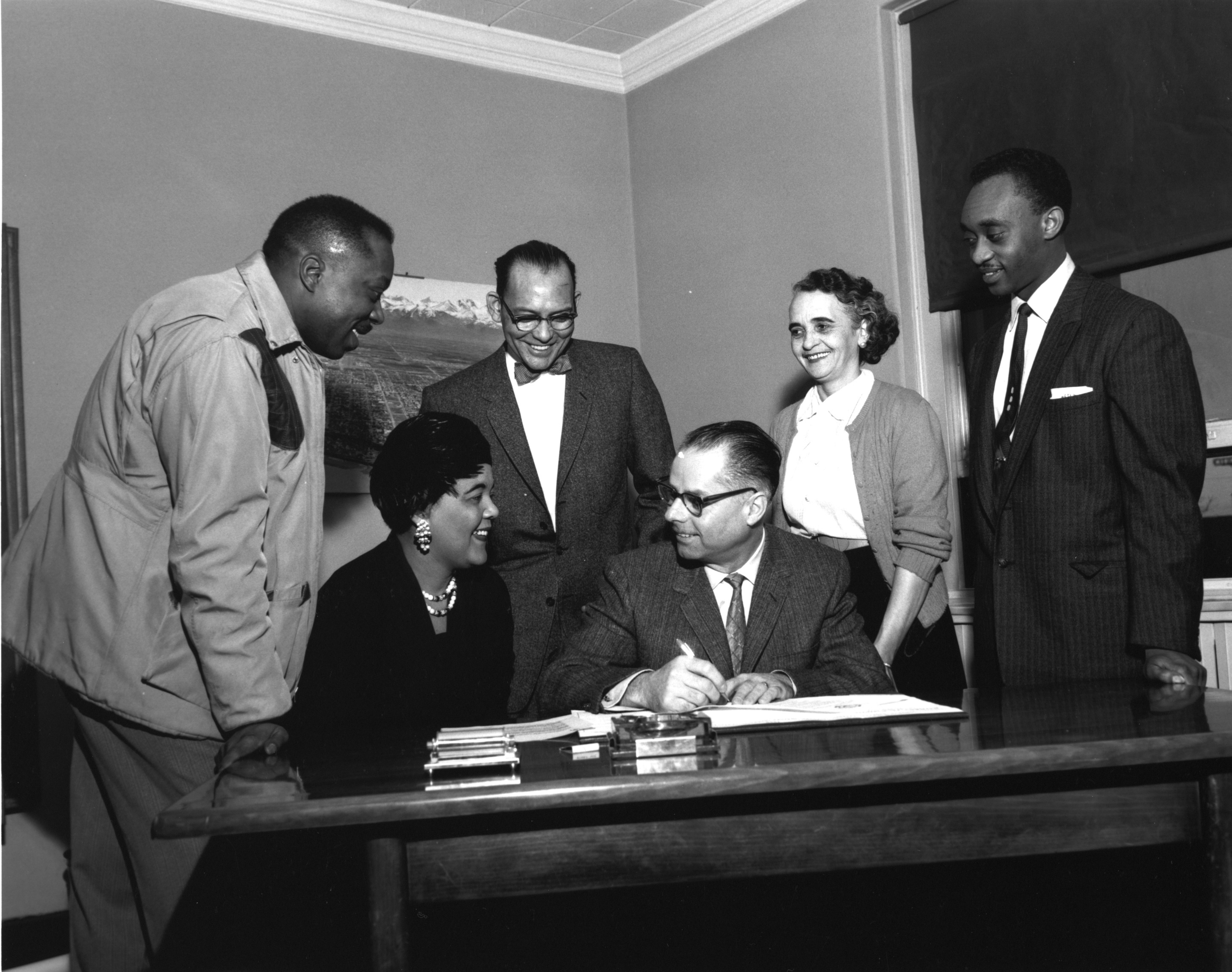
McSmith & The Alaska NAACP with the Mayor of Anchorage, George Byer, in 1959

In 1951, McSmith was one of the founders of the Anchorage, Alaska, branch of the National Association for the Advancement of Colored People. The NAACP chapter was active in local and statewide efforts to fight discrimination.

McSmith was one of four Black civil rights activists who held an early-1950s sit-in at an Anchorage restaurant known to discriminate against African-Americans. The protest, at the Pagoda restaurant, may have been the first in the city. On June 8, 1953, the four went into the restaurant and waited to be seated. They were ignored, while white patrons were escorted to tables. The four later pressed charges, because the restaurant's action violated terms of Alaska's Anti-Discrimination Act of 1945. Despite having the law on their side, they lost the case at trial.

McSmith and the NAACP also fought housing discrimination. Many subdivision covenants limited homeowners and renters to “those of the White or Caucasian race.” Such restrictions were legally unenforceable, but were socially enforced by local realtors and developers.

She also served as the associate editor of The Alaska Spotlight, Alaska's first newspaper for African Americans. The Spotlight was published from 1952 to about 1968.

McSmith, a Democrat, served as NAACP president in 1959. That same year, Gov. William Egan, a Valdez Democrat, appointed her to fill an empty seat representing the 10th District of the Alaska House of Representatives. Her swearing in was noted on the pages of Jet Magazine, a national publication for and about African Americans.

She ran for the seat in 1962 but lost in a 14-candidate race.

It wasn't until 1990 that another African-American woman served in the state legislature. In 1990, social worker Bettye Jean Ivory Davis won an election to represent an Anchorage district in the state House of Representatives. She spent 16 years in the state House and Senate.

While in office, McSmith proposed the first bill to establish an Alaska Civil Rights Commission. And in 1963, Gov. Egan swore in the State Commission for Human Rights’ first commissioners.

She also proposed a fair housing law during her legislative tenure. It failed, but in 1967, a similar ordinance was approved in Anchorage with her support. But that law did not block discrimination in lending, which continued to block Black residents’ access to better housing. McSmith told the Anchorage Daily News, “There's no freedom in being able to buy a house, but not financing it.”

McSmith moved from Anchorage to Juneau in 1972 to become Public Employment Program Director in the Office of Gov. William Egan. There, she was a strong advocate for fair employment efforts aimed at ending employment discrimination.

McSmith co-owned McSmith Enterprises with her husband. It included a TV and appliance store, real estate and a liquor store.

She was on the board of directors for the Greater Anchorage Area Community Action Agency and was Social Services Manager for the local Head Start Program. She was an organizer of the African American Historical Society of Alaska, on the board of directors for the Anchorage Tuberculosis Association and a member of the Alpha Kappa Alpha sorority.

== Personal ==
McSmith had one daughter, Kymberly, and one grandson, Teedy.

== Awards ==
McSmith received the Black Caucus Pioneer Award and the National Association for the Advancement of Colored People Human Relations and Community Service Award. And her hometown, Marshall, Texas, added her name to the Harrison County Museum's Wall of Distinction.
