= Louis D. Hastings =

American murderer

- Born: January 1944 (age 82); Kansas, U.S.
- Convictions: First degree murder (6 counts); Attempted murder (2 counts)
- Penalty: 634 years

Details
- Date: March 1, 1983
- Location: McCarthy, Alaska
- Killed: 6
- Injured: 2
- Weapons: Ruger Mini-14.22 Pistol

Louis D. Hastings is an American mass shooter who, in an attempt to disrupt the Alaska pipeline, fatally shot six of the 22 residents of McCarthy, Alaska, on March 1, 1983, with a .223 Ruger Mini-14 rifle.

== Early life ==
Hastings had received psychiatric care as a child in Atlanta, Georgia, which detailed parental "insensitivity" and what Hastings later dubbed "a dysfunctional family", noting his parents both fought to be dominant. Both his parents were also mental health patients. He was inconsistent in his school grades, excelling one year and failing the next. He identified as very shy and lacking social graces, saying that in college he only went on one date and it was likely because she'd mistaken him for someone else.

Hastings identified with nihilism, stating that "human life just isn't very meaningful", but that he cared greatly about the environment. He was employed by Stanford University in California for five years.

== Life in Alaska ==
Hastings dropped out of university and worked as a freelance computer programmer for several years before moving to Alaska. Hastings told Dr. Martin Blinder, “I wanted to go where the air and water were still clear, where there were still hills on which man had not yet set foot. I wanted to be part of the earth's quietude. I wanted to return to nature, to pristine beauty. The Gulf of Alaska would be my Walden Pond." He lived in Anchorage, but spent a year moving back and forth to McCarthy.

In Alaska, Hastings married an Aleutian wife but the marriage faltered after six months as his business also began to fail. He began planning his attack: hijacking a gasoline truck, driving it into the critical Pumping Station #12, and setting it alight, in the hopes that that would congeal the viscous oil flow and permanently clog the pipeline.

It was important to Hastings that his body be consumed in the blaze and never identified, as he didn't want family to know he'd been the perpetrator. It was to avoid identification of his remains that he then decided to kill all the other residents of McCarthy, attack the regular mail plane, and use it to dump the 20+ intended corpses in a crevasse. That way, his own body would be assumed to be missing alongside them and would not be considered related to the pipeline explosion.

Hastings made a short list, later found in his cabin, reminding himself to bring his silencer, his Ruger Mini-14, flares, clothing and ammunition.

When Hastings arrived at Christopher Richards’s cabin at 8:30am, he was invited in for coffee. He then shot Richards in the neck and near his eye. Richards stabbed Hastings in his left leg as Hastings said, "Look, you're already dead. If you'll just quit fighting, I'll make it easy for you". Richards survived and ran out of the cabin to wave down a neighbour to bring him to the airstrip, where he hitched a ride on a departing plane to Glennallen, Alaska, and reported the shooting. An unknown resident also phoned in an emergency to State Police.

At some point, Hastings killed Harley B. King, whose snowmobile was marked with bullet holes on the trail leading to the airstrip.

Hastings killed Les and Flo Hegland in their cabin near the airstrip. Their friend Maxine Edwards's body was found in the same cabin. Hastings hid in the cabin awaiting the mail plane and shot at anyone approaching the airstrip. Hastings had also killed Tim Nash and Amy Lou Ashenden Nash, and their bodies were recovered at the airstrip, where he had intended to load the corpses.

Hastings wounded Donna Byram in the arm when she ran out to warn the mail plane not to land. Hastings then took a snowmobile headed for the highway, hoping to hijack the necessary gasoline truck even without the McCarthy murders completed. But a police helicopter intercepted him before he reached the highway; according to Hastings, it swooped low and fired several shots at him, causing him to surrender. Police only stated that he was captured "without incident". The Associated Press ran a photo of a police officer seated next to one of the corpses in the snow. Police seized his computers, which contained a list of approximately 200 public officials, police officers, and others, leading to speculation it may have been a hit list.

== Conviction ==
Authorities looked into whether a fire that destroyed a lodge near Hastings' cabin was related to the attack.

There was a three-day hearing on Hastings' mental health with the defence unsuccessfully presenting Dr. Joseph Satten to support a finding of mental insanity, and the State relying on Dr. David J. Coons and Dr. Irvin Rothrock.

In July 1984, Hastings was sentenced to 634 years in prison by judge Ralph Moody, as requested by prosecutor Stephen Branchflower, after changing his plea to no contest to six counts of murder and two counts of attempted murder on the day his trial had been scheduled to start, although he later unsuccessfully tried to withdraw his pleas citing ineffective counsel.

Hastings was the subject of the Discovery Channel's Alaska Ice Cold Killers episode "Frozen Terror".
