= Nome Arctic Railway =

The Nome Arctic Railway was the name of the reorganized Wild Goose Railroad. The Railway was created in 1903, and ran for a four-month period from 1903 to 1905. In 1906 the railroad was bought out by the newly formed Seward Peninsula Railway.
