= Ralph E. Moody =

American lawyer, legislator and judge

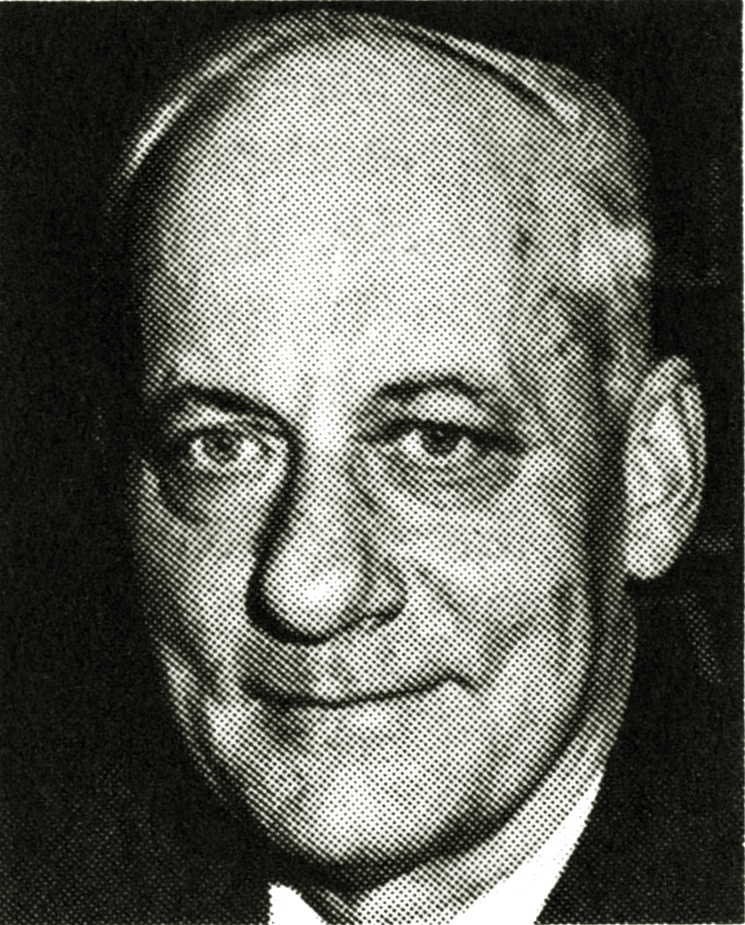

Attorney General of Alaska
- In office 1960–1962
- Governor: William A. Egan
- Preceded by: John Rader
- Succeeded by: George N. Hayes

Member of the Alaska Senate
- In office 1959–1960
- Constituency: Anchorage

Member of the Alaska Territorial Senate
- In office 1957–1959

Judge of the Alaska Superior Court
- In office 1968–1985

Personal details
- Born: November 23, 1915 Vance, Alabama, U.S.
- Died: February 19, 1997 (aged 81) Anchorage, Alaska, U.S.
- Spouse: Carolyn Rose Krebs (m. 1942)
- Education: University of Alabama (BA, LL.B.)

Military service
- Branch/service: United States Army Signal Corps
- Years of service: 1940–1946

Ralph Edward Moody (November 23, 1915 – February 19, 1997) was an Alabama-born lawyer, legislator and jurist who helped steer Alaska through the transition from territorial government to early statehood, then spent a quarter-century shaping the state’s jurisprudence from the Alaska Superior Court bench. A World War II Signal Corps veteran educated at the University of Alabama, Moody served in Alaska’s last Territorial Senate, sat in the 1st State Senate, became the state’s second attorney general, and presided over some of Alaska’s most consequential criminal and constitutional cases.

== Early life and education ==
Moody was born in the mill town of Vance, Tuscaloosa County, on November 23, 1915. He graduated from Murphy High School in Mobile, earned a B.A. at the University of Alabama and completed an LL.B. there in 1940. Immediately after law school, he entered the U.S. Army Signal Corps, serving from 1940 to 1946, then accepted appointment as an attorney with the U.S. Army Corps of Engineers at Elmendorf Air Force Base, Alaska.

== Career ==
=== Legal and political beginnings ===
After demobilization Moody settled in Anchorage in 1947 and built a private practice that led to appointments as assistant U.S. attorney for the Third Judicial District and later as Anchorage city attorney.

=== Legislature and attorney general ===
In 1956, Alaska Territory voters elected him to the Territorial Senate for the 1957–58 biennium; he chaired the Alaska Legislative Council during the climactic statehood campaign, and a Boston ceremony in September 1958 recorded him accepting a scroll recognizing Alaska’s imminent admission to the Union.

Moody won an Anchorage seat in the 1st State Senate and served through the inaugural session that adjourned in April 1959. Governor William A. Egan appointed him Attorney General of Alaska in 1960, making him only the second person to hold that office in the new state; he served until 1962. During his tenure, the Department of Law began drafting uniform regulations for the enlarged state bureaucracy and defending the fledgling Alaska Permanent Fund dividend statute.

=== Superior Court judge ===
Appointed to the Alaska Superior Court in 1968, Moody served until 1985 and twice held the post of presiding judge for the vast Third Judicial District. Known for austere courtroom discipline, he once ordered an unprepared lawyer to fashion a necktie from a shoelace, he also implemented the Expert Advisory Panel procedure for medical-malpractice litigation in 1979.

Among his headline cases, Moody’s 1984 sentencing of serial killer Robert Hansen to life plus 461 years without parole drew national attention and became a benchmark for victims’-rights jurisprudence. He also sentenced Louis D. Hastings to 634 years.

Earlier, in Zobel v. Williams (1980) he struck down Alaska’s original dividend formula for discriminating against recent arrivals, a ruling later reversed but widely credited with forcing lawmakers to redesign the program.

== Personal life ==
Moody married Carolyn Rose Krebs in 1942; the couple settled in Anchorage and were active in Kiwanis, the Elks and Salvation Army advisory boards.

== Awards and recognition ==
Moody’s judicial colleagues elected him the first chair of Alaska’s Commission on Judicial Qualifications, and the Alaska Bar Association’s Bar Rag presented a special award honoring his “two decades of uncompromising service” at its 1988 annual meeting. The Alaska State Medical Association later credited him for pioneering the Expert Advisory Panel system that other states emulated.
