= Michael James Heney =

Canadian railway contractor

Michael James "Moose" Heney (October 24, 1864 – October 11, 1910) was a railroad contractor, best known for his work on the first two railroads built in Alaska, the White Pass and Yukon Route and the Copper River and Northwestern Railway. The son of Irish immigrants, Heney rose to the top of his profession before his death. His life inspired several books and at least one movie.

== Early life ==
Michael James Heney was born on October 24, 1864, near Stonecliffe, Renfrew County, Canada West. He was the son of Thomas Eugene Heney and Mary Ann McCourt, Irish immigrants. His family farmed in the upper Ottawa Valley.

At age 14, Heney ran away from home to work on the newly announced Canadian Pacific Railway. He started as a water boy, then graduated to a track laying crew assistant and mule skinner. In 1883 he was included in a survey and location crew in the Selkirk Mountains, eventually becoming foreman. In 1887 he was hired to construct a rail line for the Seattle, Lake Shore and Eastern Railway. In 1897 he was contracted to build a gold mining hydraulic line at Anchor Point, Alaska.

== Building Railroads in Alaska ==
When the Klondike Gold Rush came, Heney was ready. He visited the Skagway area to survey potential routes to the interior. By chance, he met Erastus Hawkins representing the Pacific Contract Company, Limited, which was organized to build through the White Pass inside of the St. James hotels lobby. A deal was struck and Heney was hired, first as labor foreman and then as contractor. Built through mountainous wilderness, far from supplies, using labor that was returning from the gold fields, the 110.7 mile White Pass and Yukon Route was an outstanding achievement and gained Heney an international reputation.

Heney next turned his attention to the copper and coal deposits recently discovered on the Copper River (Alaska). He surveyed a route, bought land, named the city of Cordova, Alaska and started construction, while rival companies built on different lines.

The dramatic conflicts between the various crews included gunfire. The Guggenheims and J.P. Morgan, via the Alaska Syndicate, sought access to the copper ore deposits at Kennecott, Alaska. When an alternate route starting at the Katalla, Alaska, port was "wiped out in a winter storm", the syndicate acquired the Close Brothers-Heney interest."

Heney was bought out for $250,000 and he retired for a second time.

After having many problems building the railway they appointed him contractor. The Copper River and Northwestern Railway was one of the most difficult construction projects ever undertaken. The line crossed in-between two glaciers, under primitive conditions, far from any supplies. The Million Dollar Bridge, which is between the two glaciers, was completed just hours before the spring ice would have destroyed it.

At the pinnacle of his career, Heney left Cordova to complete some business arrangements in Seattle and New York. On his way back north, his ship hit an uncharted rock and sank. Heney went under deck to rescue his horses, but the last boat left without him when he returned on deck. So he swam to a boat and held on to the stern while it was rowed ashore as there was no room on it. Shortly afterwards he developed pulmonary tuberculosis and died within a year. He is buried in Calvary Cemetery in Seattle.

Widely popular, Heney was known as "Big Mike" or "The Irish Prince of Alaska". A glacier, Heney Peak and range of mountains in Alaska overlooking Cordova bears his name.
