= Wild Goose Railroad =

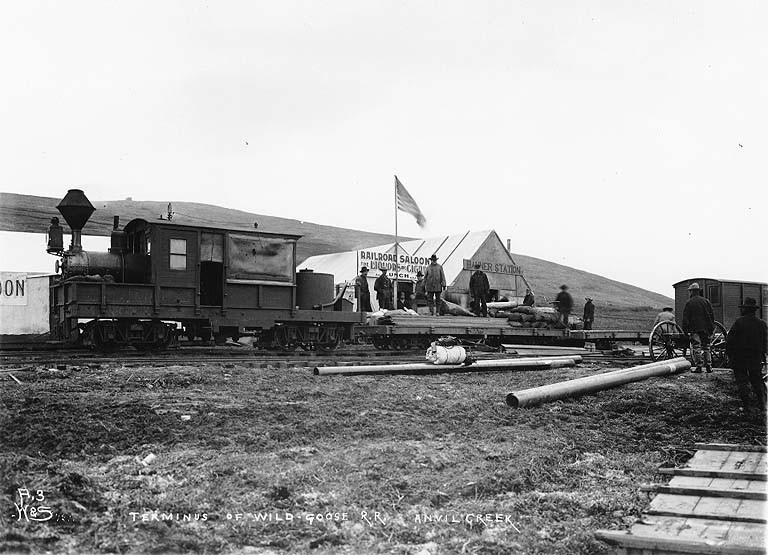
Wild Goose Railroad at Anvil Creek, Alaska

The Wild Goose Railroad was created by the Wild Goose Mining Company in Alaska. Charles D. Lane acted as the President of the Wild Goose Mining company, until his death in 1911. The Wild Goose Railroad ran from Nome to Lane's Landing, named after Charles D. Lane, at the town of Shelton, in a straight line about 50 miles (80 km) north-northeast of Nome at the Kuzitrin River. In 1903, the Wild Goose Railroad was reorganized as the Nome Arctic Railway.
