= Chitina, Alaska =

Chitina Tsedi Na'
- CDP
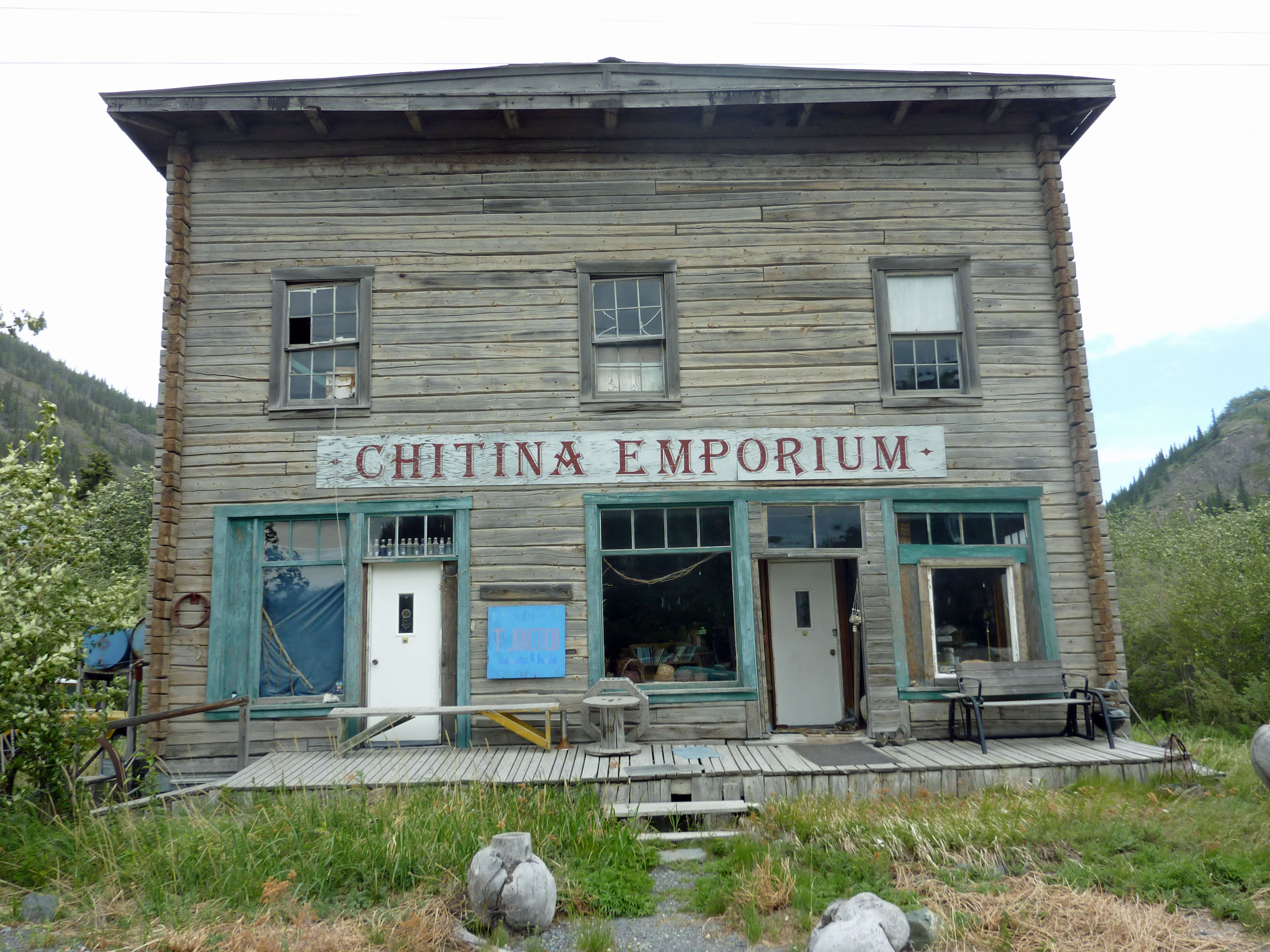
- Chitina Emporium in 2011

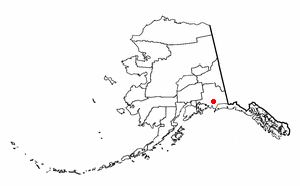
- Location of Chitina, Alaska
- Coordinates: 61°30′57″N 144°26′12″W
- Country: United States
- State: Alaska
- Census Area: Copper River

Government
  - State senator: Click Bishop (R)
  - State rep.: Mike Cronk (R)

Area
  - Total: 99.49 sq mi (257.67 km^{2})
  - Land: 84.68 sq mi (219.31 km^{2})
  - Water: 14.81 sq mi (38.35 km^{2})

Population (2020)
  - Total: 101
  - Density: 1.2/sq mi (0.46/km^{2})
- Time zone: UTC-9 (Alaska (AKST))
  - Summer (DST): UTC-8 (AKDT)
- ZIP code: 99566
- Area code: 907
- FIPS code: 02-14110

Chitina (Ahtna Athabascan Tsedi Na' [tʃɛ.diː.näʔ] < tsedi "copper" + na' "river") is a census-designated place (CDP) in Copper River Census Area, Alaska, United States. As of the 2020 census, Chitina had a population of 101.

== Geography ==
Chitina is located on the west bank of the Copper River at its confluence with the Chitina River on the Edgerton Highway, and junction with the McCarthy Road. It is 85 km (53 mi) southeast of Copper Center and 106 km (66 mi) southeast of Glennallen. It is outside the western boundary of the Wrangell - St Elias National Park and Preserve.

In 1945, work had begun to convert the CR&NW railroad line, from Cordova to Kennicott, into a highway, but work halted with the 1964 Good Friday earthquake, leaving a significant gap between Chitina and the Million Dollar Bridge near Cordova. The rail route from Chitina to Kennicott is a roadway, the McCarthy Road.

According to the United States Census Bureau, the CDP has a total area of 95.8 square miles (248 km^{2}), of which, 84.6 square miles (219 km^{2}) of it is land and 11.1 square miles (29 km^{2}) of it (11.62%) is water.

== Climate ==
Chitina has a continental subarctic climate (Köppen Dfc).

Climate data for Chitina
Month	Jan	Feb	Mar	Apr	May	Jun	Jul	Aug	Sep	Oct	Nov	Dec	Year
Record high °F (°C)	52 (11)	47 (8)	49 (9)	67 (19)	85 (29)	91 (33)	88 (31)	82 (28)	69 (21)	69 (21)	46 (8)	48 (9)	91 (33)
Mean daily maximum °F (°C)	0.4 (−17.6)	17.2 (−8.2)	31.9 (−0.1)	44.7 (7.1)	57.1 (13.9)	64.9 (18.3)	66.8 (19.3)	63.7 (17.6)	55.7 (13.2)	38.5 (3.6)	18.4 (−7.6)	7.3 (−13.7)	38.9 (3.8)
Mean daily minimum °F (°C)	−16.8 (−27.1)	−4.6 (−20.3)	4.9 (−15.1)	23.6 (−4.7)	34.3 (1.3)	43.3 (6.3)	46.9 (8.3)	43.4 (6.3)	34.9 (1.6)	20.4 (−6.4)	2.9 (−16.2)	−9.9 (−23.3)	18.6 (−7.4)
Record low °F (°C)	−55 (−48)	−47 (−44)	−41 (−41)	−18 (−28)	4 (−16)	28 (−2)	28 (−2)	20 (−7)	10 (−12)	−20 (−29)	−42 (−41)	−56 (−49)	−56 (−49)
Average precipitation inches (mm)	0.56 (14)	0.87 (22)	0.31 (7.9)	0.19 (4.8)	0.34 (8.6)	1.06 (27)	1.32 (34)	1.2 (30)	1.19 (30)	1.1 (28)	1.24 (31)	1.62 (41)	10.99 (279)
Average snowfall inches (cm)	3 (7.6)	6.2 (16)	2.1 (5.3)	0.6 (1.5)	0 (0)	0 (0)	0 (0)	0 (0)	0 (0)	2.3 (5.8)	7.4 (19)	4.3 (11)	26 (66)
Average precipitation days	3	3	2	1	2	5	6	6	6	5	4	4	47

== Demographics ==
Historical population
Census	Pop.	Note	%±
1920	171		—
1930	116		−32.2%
1940	176		51.7%
1950	92		−47.7%
1960	31		−66.3%
1970	38		22.6%
1980	42		10.5%
1990	49		16.7%
2000	123		151.0%
2010	126		2.4%
2020	101		−19.8%
U.S. Decennial Census

Chitina first appeared on the 1920 U.S. Census as an unincorporated village. It was made a census-designated place (CDP) in 1980.

As of the census of 2000, there were 123 people, 52 households, and 30 families residing in the CDP. The population density was 1.5 inhabitants per square mile (0.58/km^{2}). There were 54 housing units at an average density of 0.6 per square mile (0.23/km^{2}). The racial makeup of the CDP was 51.22% White, 33.33% Alaskan Native, and 15.45% from two or more races.

There were 52 households, out of which 23.1% had children under the age of 18 living with them, 42.3% were married couples living together, 13.5% had a female householder with no husband present, and 42.3% were non-families. 36.5% of all households were made up of individuals, and 9.6% had someone living alone who was 65 years of age or older. The average household size was 2.37 and the average family size was 3.07.

In the CDP, the population was spread out, with 29.3% under the age of 18, 7.3% from 18 to 24, 23.6% from 25 to 44, 30.9% from 45 to 64, and 8.9% who were 65 years of age or older. The median age was 39 years. For every 100 females, there were 86.4 males. For every 100 females age 18 and over, there were 102.3 males.

The median income for a household in the CDP was $26,000, and the median income for a family was $28,750. Males had a median income of $31,250 versus $17,500 for females. The per capita income for the CDP was $10,835. There were 3.3% of families and 12.7% of the population living below the poverty line, including no under eighteens and 15.4% of those over 64.

== History ==
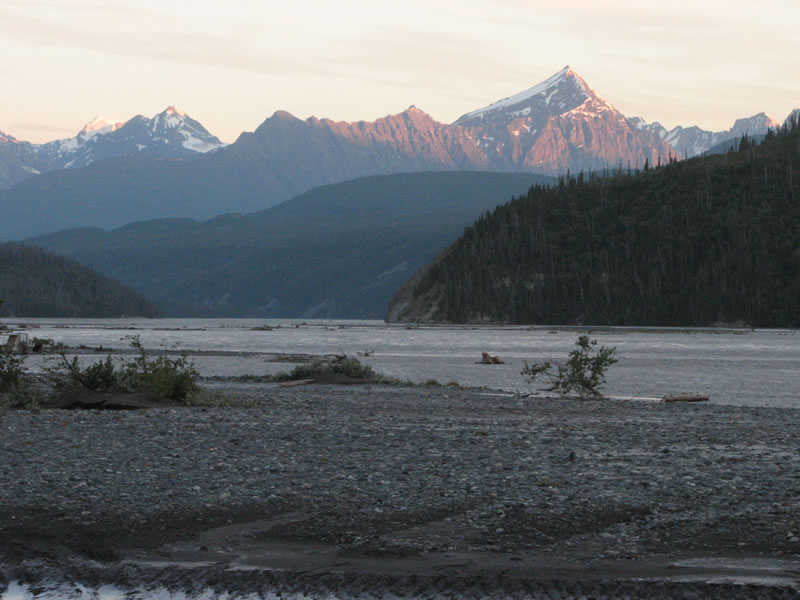
Copper River near Chitina.

Athabascans have lived in the area around Chitina for centuries as evidenced by the archaeological sites south and east of Chitina. Before 1900, Chitina was the site of large village whose population was slowly decimated by the influx of people, disease and conflicts.

Copper ore was discovered in about 1900 along the northern edge of the Chitina River valley. This brought a rush of prospectors and homesteaders to the area.

Stephen Birch homesteaded the site in 1908. The Copper River and Northwestern Railway enabled Chitina to develop into a thriving community by 1914. It had a general store, a clothing store, a meat market, stables, a tinsmith, five hotels, several rooming houses, a pool hall, bars, restaurants, dance halls and a movie theater. From 1933 until the closure of the mines in 1938, the general store was managed by Otto Moses of Des Moines, Washington, recruited by O.A. Nelson.

The mines closed in 1938 and the remaining support activities moved to what is now the Glennallen area. Chitina became a virtual ghost town. Otto Adrian Nelson, a surveying engineer for the Kennecott Mines, eventually bought up much of the town. He built a unique hydroelectric system that supplied electric power to all his buildings. He also supplied much of the town center with hot and cold running water.

Current activity in Chitina revolves around the dipnet fishing for salmon that occurs every summer. Alaskans are allowed to dip a large number of salmon during their spawning runs and Chitina is an accessible and popular place for this activity.

In late 1977, jeweler Art Koeninger purchased the Chitina Tin Shop with the intention of turning it into a residence. In 1979, the site, formerly known as Fred's Place and Schaupp's, was placed on the National Register of Historic Places and has won two historic preservation grants. It currently houses the Spirit Mountain Artworks.
