= Copper River and Northwestern Railway =

- U.S. National Register of Historic Places
- U.S. Historic district
- Alaska Heritage Resources Survey
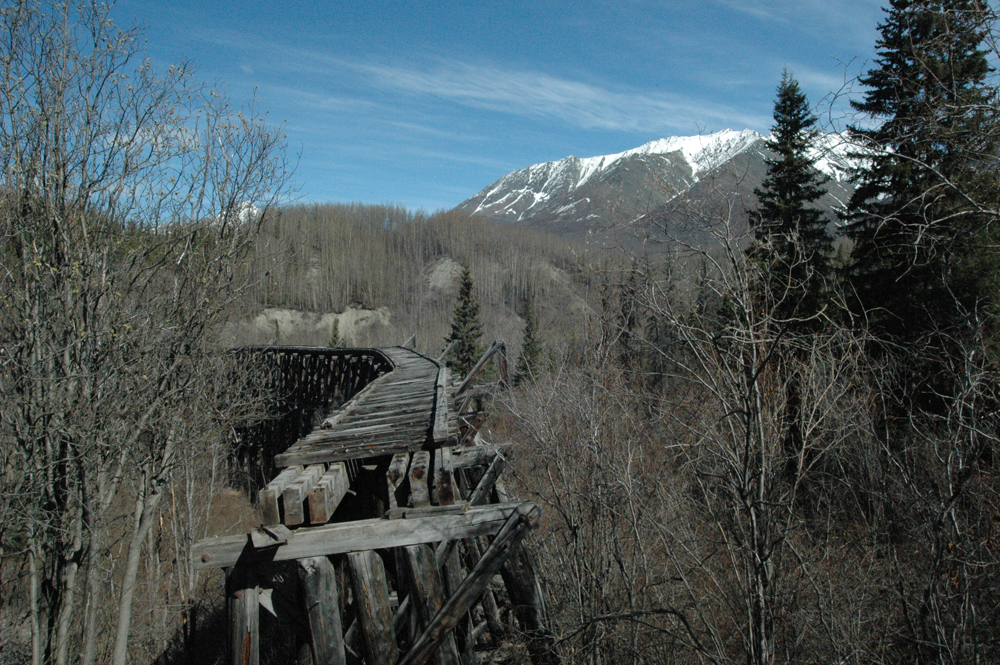
- A disused CR&NW bridge along McCarthy Road

- Location within Alaska
- Location: Chitina, Alaska to Tasnuna River, along western bank of Copper River
- Nearest city: Chitina, Alaska
- Coordinates: 61°20′21″N 144°47′59″W
- Architect: Michael J. Heney
- NRHP reference No.: 73002275
- AHRS No.: VAL-047
- Added to NRHP: April 24, 1973

The Copper River and Northwestern Railway (CR&NW) consisted of two rail lines, the Copper River line and the Northwestern line. Michael James Heney had secured the right-of-way up the Copper River in 1904. He started building the railway from Cordova, Alaska in 1906. The town of Cordova, Alaska, was named by Heney on March 13, 1906, based on the original name given by Salvador Fidalgo. Both these railroads were abandoned and little remains of them. A 0-4-0 locomotive, "Ole", located near Goose City on a siding of the Alaska Anthracite Railroad Company is the only equipment left. Many of the holdings of the CR&NW railroad including Ole were acquired for this railroad by Mr. Clark Davis and his partners in 1908 after a major storm destroyed the Katalla area facilities in 1907. The town of Cordova would like to move Ole to a memorial site in Cordova to celebrate its role in these railroads. Ole was declared eligible for the National Register of Historic Places in 1988.

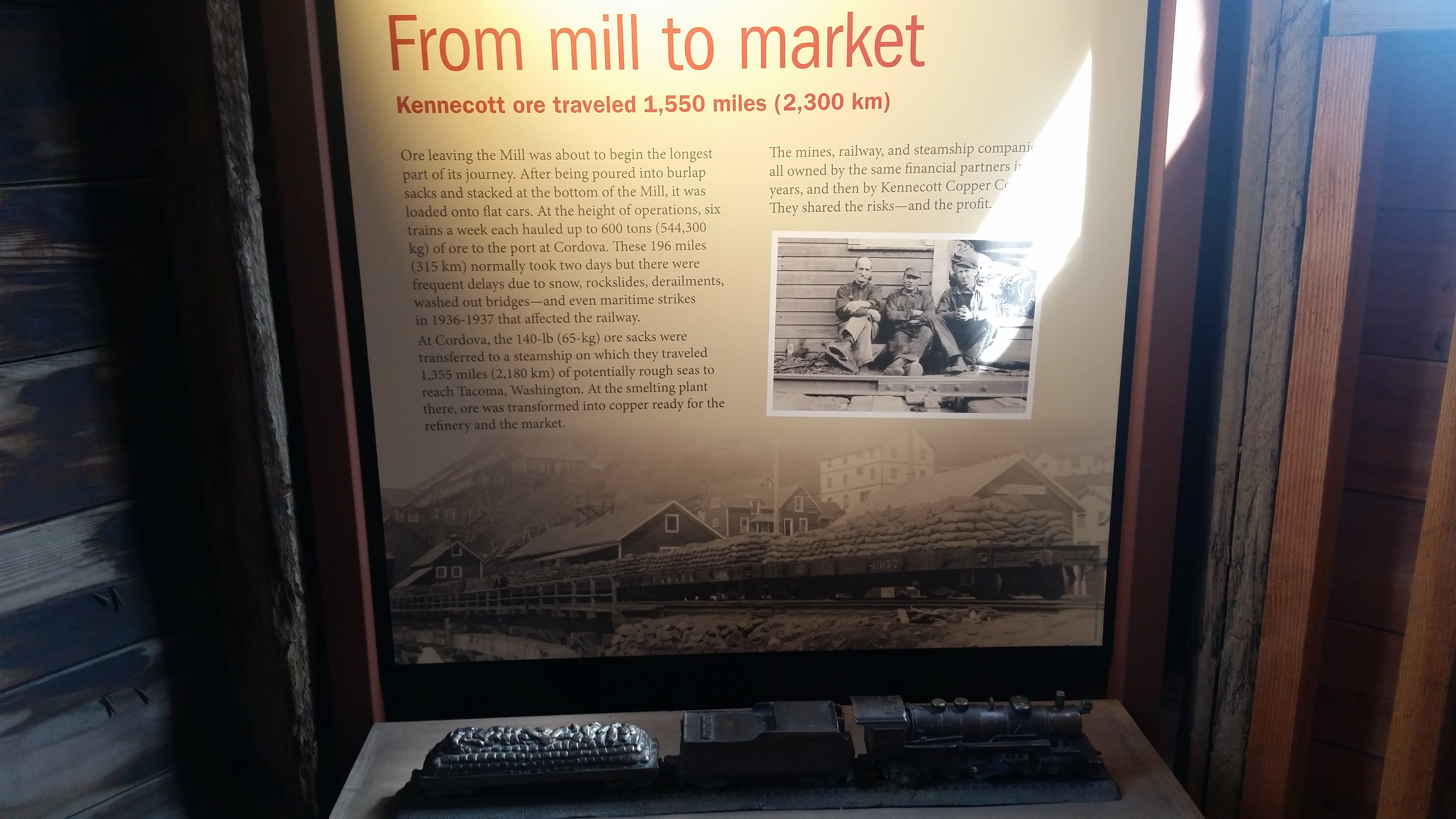
Kennecott Mines National Historic Landmark historical marker for the CR&NW

In 1905 Myron K. Rodgers received a four-year contract to assist the Guggenheim family with their interests in Alaska. This work consisted of establishing coal claims in the Bering River coal field and building a railroad (Northwestern) to serve them. Myron Rodgers employed his brother Wesley P. Rodgers to carry out the surveys in 1906 and to build the railroad in 1907. The railroad started at Palm Point and extended to the northeast past the town of Katalla towards the coal fields. At Palm Point, a loading pier was built into the bay and a branch line for the Copper River railroad was extended west to connect to it. The 1907 winter storm destroyed all of these facilities, including the engine house and support base.

By Oct. 1906, Heney had retired and decided to sell his Copper River right-of-way to the Alaska Syndicate that consisted of M. Guggenheim & Sons and J.P. Morgan & Co. However, he returned to work for Daniel Guggenheim on the Copper River railway in 1907 after the destruction of the winter storm. Guggenheim had decided Cordova was a better starting point. The railroad was built by the Kennecott Corporation (now part of the Alaska Syndicate) between 1908 and 1911 to take copper ore from Kennecott, Alaska to Cordova, Alaska, a distance of 315 km (196 mi).

The Alaska Syndicate included investment by J.P. Morgan. He had bought John Rosene's Northwestern Commercial Company, an empire of mercantile companies, shipping interests, and railroads. The syndicate started construction from Cordova, the Bonanza mine site at Kennecott, and at a point midway where the Nizina River merged with the Copper River. Challenges included bridging the Kuskulana River canyon and the Copper River with the Million Dollar Bridge. "The completion of the Million Dollar Bridge in the summer of 1910 effectively guaranteed the success of the rail project and the shipment of the first load of Kennecott ore in early 1911."

Heney had traveled to New York in 1909 to meet with Daniel Guggenheim and other board members about the railroad progress. On his return journey, he departed Seattle on 23 Aug. 1909 aboard the steamship Ohio. On 25 Aug., the Ohio struck an uncharted rock and sank. Heney finally made it to Cordova on 18 Sept. On 30 Nov 1909, the railroad reached the Tiekel River, completing the first phase of the contract. Heney made another trip to New York to turn over that portion of the railroad to the Katalla Company. On the return trip, he spent the winter in Seattle. His health failing, Heney finally succumbed to pulmonary tuberculosis on 4 Oct. 1910.

The last spike in the construction, a "copper spike", was driven on 29 March 1911, by Chief Engineer E. C. Hawkins and Superintendent Samuel Murchison at Kennicott.

The cost of the railway at $25 million was justified because the mines produced $200 million worth of copper ore during their operation of which at least 50 percent was profit. There were 129 bridges constructed between Cordova and Chitina.

As far as is known, the CR&NW was the only railway in Alaska to employ wigwags at railroad crossings.

The good ore in the mines ran out and the last train ran on 11 Nov. 1938. In 1941, the Kennecott Corporation donated the railroad right-of-way to the United States "for use as a public highway". In 1953 conversion was started. The Alaska Dept. of Highways had extended the Copper River Highway to Mile 59, from Cordova to the Million Dollar Bridge, by 1964. However, the damage to 28 bridges after the Good Friday earthquake delayed further construction. By 1972 the highway extended to Mile 72 and south 20 miles from Chitina.

The bridge has recently (2005) been repaired. Bridge 339 washed out in 2012 and cut the access to the bridge. The roadbed from Chitina to McCarthy now forms the McCarthy Road.

== Historic designations ==
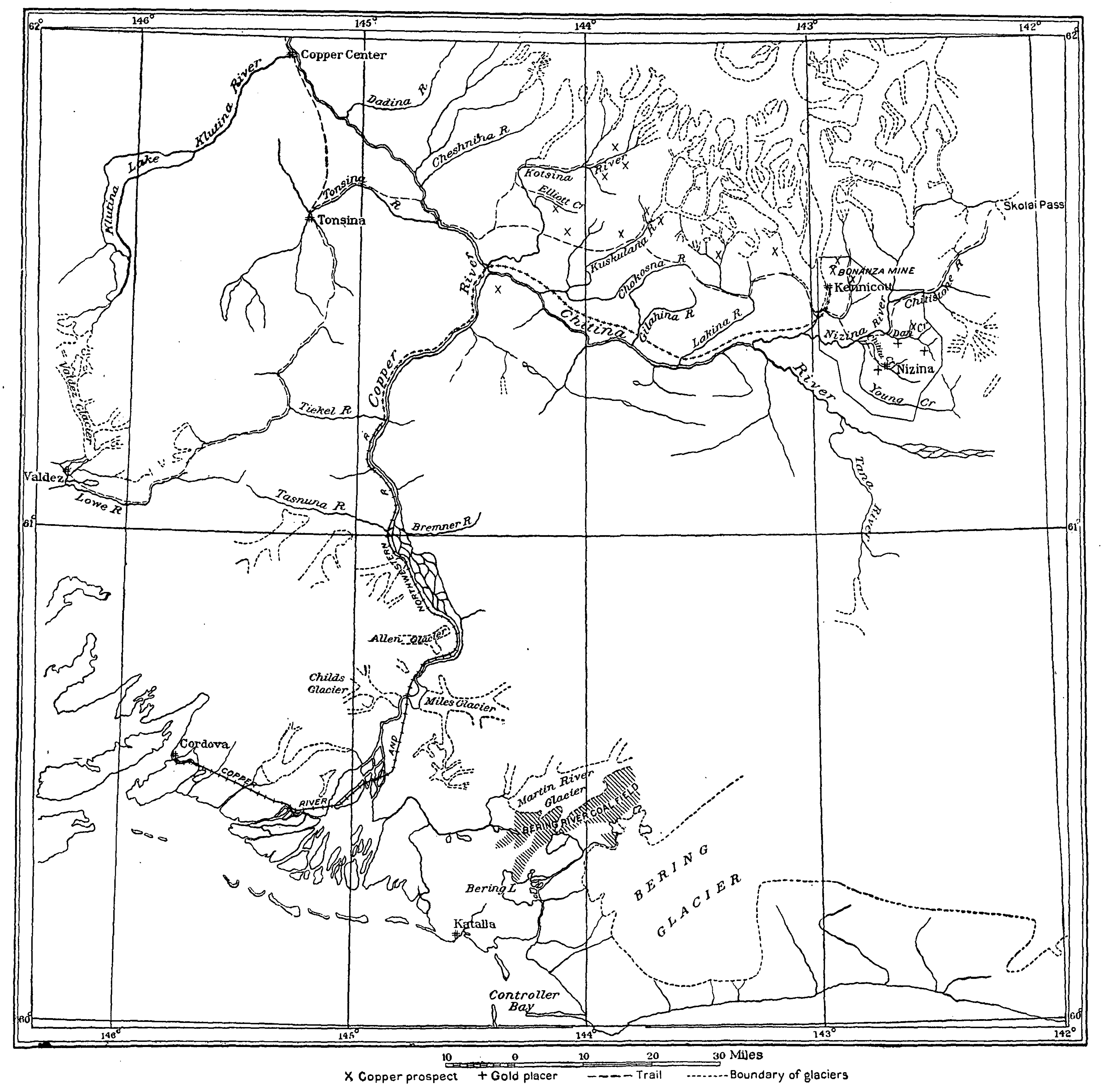
Southern portion of the Copper River showing the location of the railway from Cordova to Kennicott

On April 24, 1973, the railway remains, comprising 11 trestles, an abandoned native village with a Russian post and the Tiekel Station, were added as a historic district to the National Register of Historic Places. The railway's bunkhouse and messhouse at Chitina were also added to the register on December 5, 2002. The 0-4-0 tank engine, Number 3, "Ole", was declared eligible for the National Register in 1988.

== Rolling stock ==
By 1936, the company had rostered 13 steam locomotives, 6 passenger cars and 327 freight cars.

== See also ==
- National Register of Historic Places listings in Copper River Census Area, Alaska
