= National Register of Historic Places listings in Wrangell–St. Elias National Park and Preserve =

This is a list of the National Register of Historic Places listings in Wrangell–St. Elias National Park and Preserve.

This is intended to be a complete list of the properties and districts on the National Register of Historic Places in Wrangell-St. Elias National Park and Preserve, Alaska, United States. The locations of National Register properties and districts for which the latitude and longitude coordinates are included below, may be seen in a Google map.

There are 9 properties and districts listed on the National Register in the park. One property is a National Historic Landmark District.

This National Park Service list is complete through NPS recent listings posted June 20, 2025.

== Current listings ==
| | Name on the Register | Image | Date listed | Location | City or town | Description |
|---|---|---|---|---|---|---|
| 1 | Bremner Historic Mining District | Bremner Historic Mining District | June 15, 2000 (#00000659) | Along Golconda Creek, about 47 miles (76 km) southeast of Chitina; 61°01′45″N 143°26′20″W | Chitina | |
| 2 | Chisana Historic District | Chisana Historic District | November 29, 1985 (#85002999) | Extending west 0.25 miles (0.40 km) from the southern end of Chisana Airstrip; 62°03′56″N 142°02′49″W | Chisana | |
| 3 | Chisana Historic Mining Landscape | Chisana Historic Mining Landscape | May 14, 1998 (#98000436) | Address restricted | Northway | |
| 4 | Kansky's | | May 16, 1997 (#97000432) | Mile 42 of Nabesna Road, about 2 miles (3.2 km) north of the Nabesna Mine; 62°23′52″N 142°59′45″W | Nabesna | |
| 5 | Kennecott Mines | Kennecott Mines | July 12, 1978 (#78003420) | East of Kennicott Glacier, about 6.5 miles (10.5 km) north of McCarthy; 61°31′09″N 142°50′29″W | Kennecott | |
| 6 | McCarthy General Store | McCarthy General Store | January 31, 1978 (#78003421) | Southeastern corner of Kennicott Avenue and Skolai Street; 61°25′55″N 142°55′26″W | McCarthy | |
| 7 | McCarthy Power Plant | | April 26, 1979 (#79003752) | West side of Shushanna Avenue, on McCarthy Creek; 61°25′56″N 142°55′35″W | McCarthy | |
| 8 | Nabesna Gold Mine Historic District | | May 25, 1979 (#79003755) | Base of White Mountain at end of Nabesna Road; 62°22′18″N 143°00′45″W | Nabesna | |
| 9 | Valdez Trail-Copper Bluff Segment | | February 12, 1998 (#98000077) | Milepost 106.5 on the Richardson Highway; 62°01′16″N 145°21′52″W | Copper City | part of the Valdez Trail MPS |

== See also ==
- National Register of Historic Places listings in Copper River Census Area, Alaska
- List of National Historic Landmarks in Alaska
- National Register of Historic Places listings in Alaska
