= McCarthy Building =

McCarthy Building may refer to:

- McCarthy Building (Chicago)
- Timothy J. McCarthy Building, Faribault, Minnesota
- McCarthy Building (Troy, New York), Rensselaer County, New York
- McCarthy-Blosser-Dillon Building, Logan, Ohio

== See also ==
- McCarthy Power Plant, McCarthy, Alaska, listed on the NRHP in Copper River Central Area, Alaska
- McCarthy General Store, McCarthy, Alaska, listed on the NRHP in Copper River Central Area, Alaska
- McCarthy House (disambiguation)
