= Tanada Peak =

Mountain in Alaska, United States of America

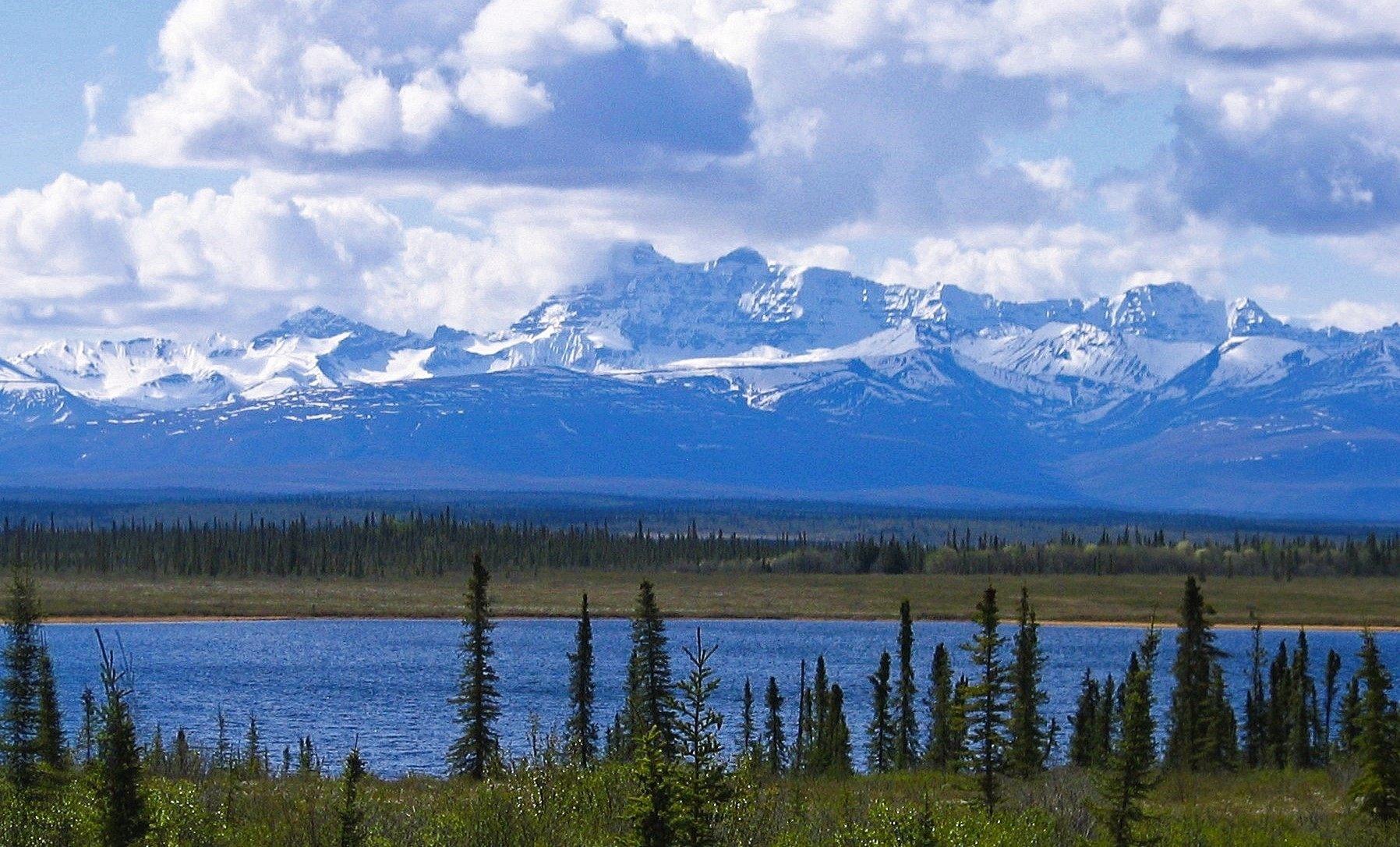
- North aspect

Highest point
- Elevation: 9,358 ft (2,852 m)
- Prominence: 3,408 ft (1,039 m)
- Isolation: 13.6 mi (21.9 km)
- Coordinates: 62°18′06″N 143°30′20″W

Naming
- Etymology: Tanada Lake

Geography
- Location within Alaska
- Interactive map of Tanada Peak
- Country: United States
- State: Alaska
- Census Area: Copper River
- Protected area: Wrangell–St. Elias National Park and Preserve
- Parent range: Wrangell Mountains
- Topo map: USGS Nabesna B-6

Geology
- Rock age: Pleistocene
- Mountain type: Eroded shield volcano
- Rock type(s): Andesite, Dacite
- Volcanic field: Wrangell Volcanic Field
- Last eruption: 970,000 years ago

Tanada Peak is a 9,358-foot (2,852 m) mountain summit in the US state of Alaska.

== Description ==
Tanada Peak is located in the Wrangell Mountains and within Wrangell–St. Elias National Park and Preserve, with the west slope in the park and east slope in the preserve. Tanada ranks as the 21st-highest peak in the preserve and 53rd-highest in the park. It is situated 11 miles (18 km) northeast of the Copper Glacier terminus and 17 miles (27 km) southwest of Nabesna. The remote mountain can be seen from the Nabesna Road. Precipitation runoff and glacial meltwater from the mountain drains into tributaries of the Copper River. Topographic relief is significant as the summit rises 5,750 feet (1,750 m) above Goat Creek valley in three miles (4.8 km). The mountain's name was applied in 1902 by David C. Witherspoon, U.S. Geological Survey topographer, in association with nearby Tanada Lake, and the toponym has been officially adopted by the U.S. Board on Geographic Names. The lake's name comes from an Ahtna word reported in 1899 by W.J. Peters of the USGS. "Tanada" (/təˈneɪdə/) from Ahtna language (tanaadi menn, or tanaadi dzel) translates as "moving water lake."

== Geology ==
Tanada Peak is the erosional remnant of Tanada Volcano which was an andesitic shield volcano which probably began forming 1.5 million years ago, with the last eruption occurring 970,000 years ago. Prior to one million years ago, the shield collapsed, forming a caldera. The peak is now the high point within a caldera measuring four by six miles (6.4 by 9.7 km). An unnamed glacier in the caldera on the peak's southwest slope is a small remnant of the much larger glaciers that once covered the volcano and carved away much of the 400 km^{2} (150 sq mi) shield.

== Climate ==
Based on the Köppen climate classification, Tanada Peak is located in a tundra climate zone, with long, cold, snowy winters, and cool summers. Weather systems coming off the Gulf of Alaska are forced upwards by the Wrangell Mountains (orographic lift), causing heavy precipitation in the form of rainfall and snowfall. Winter temperatures can drop below -10 °F with wind chill factors below −20 °F. This climate supports an unnamed glacier and permanent ice surrounding the peak.

== Gallery ==
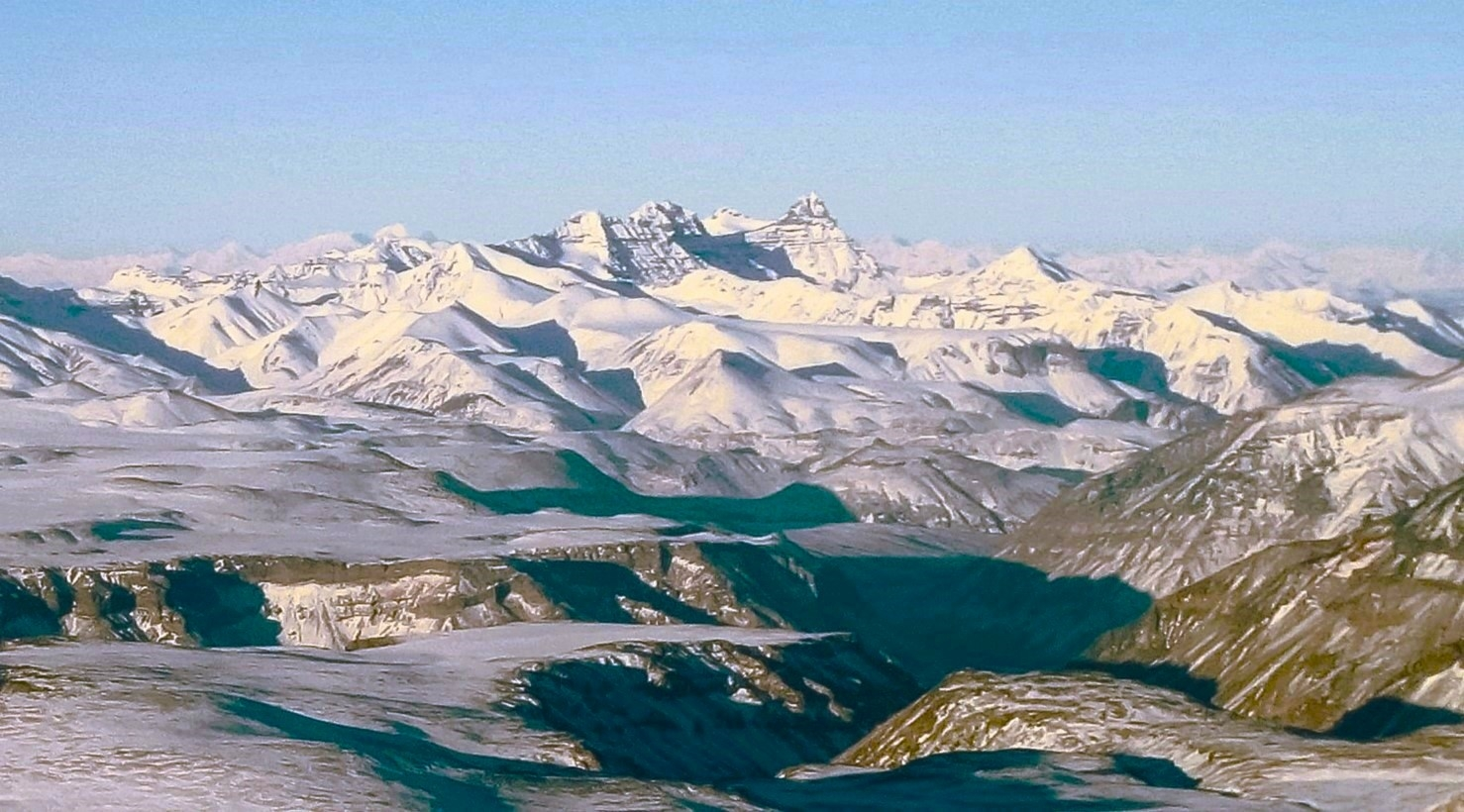
Southeast aspect of Tanada Peak centered on skyline

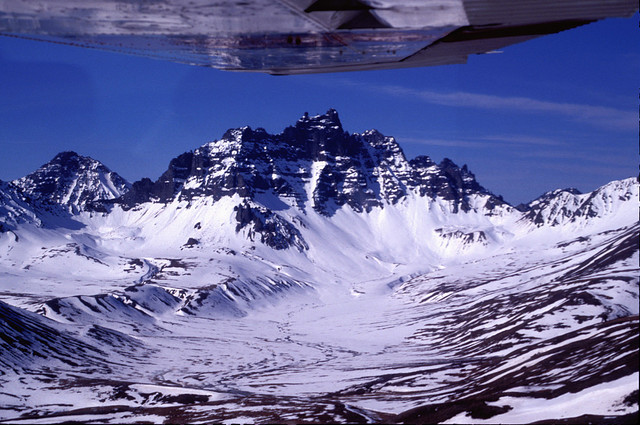

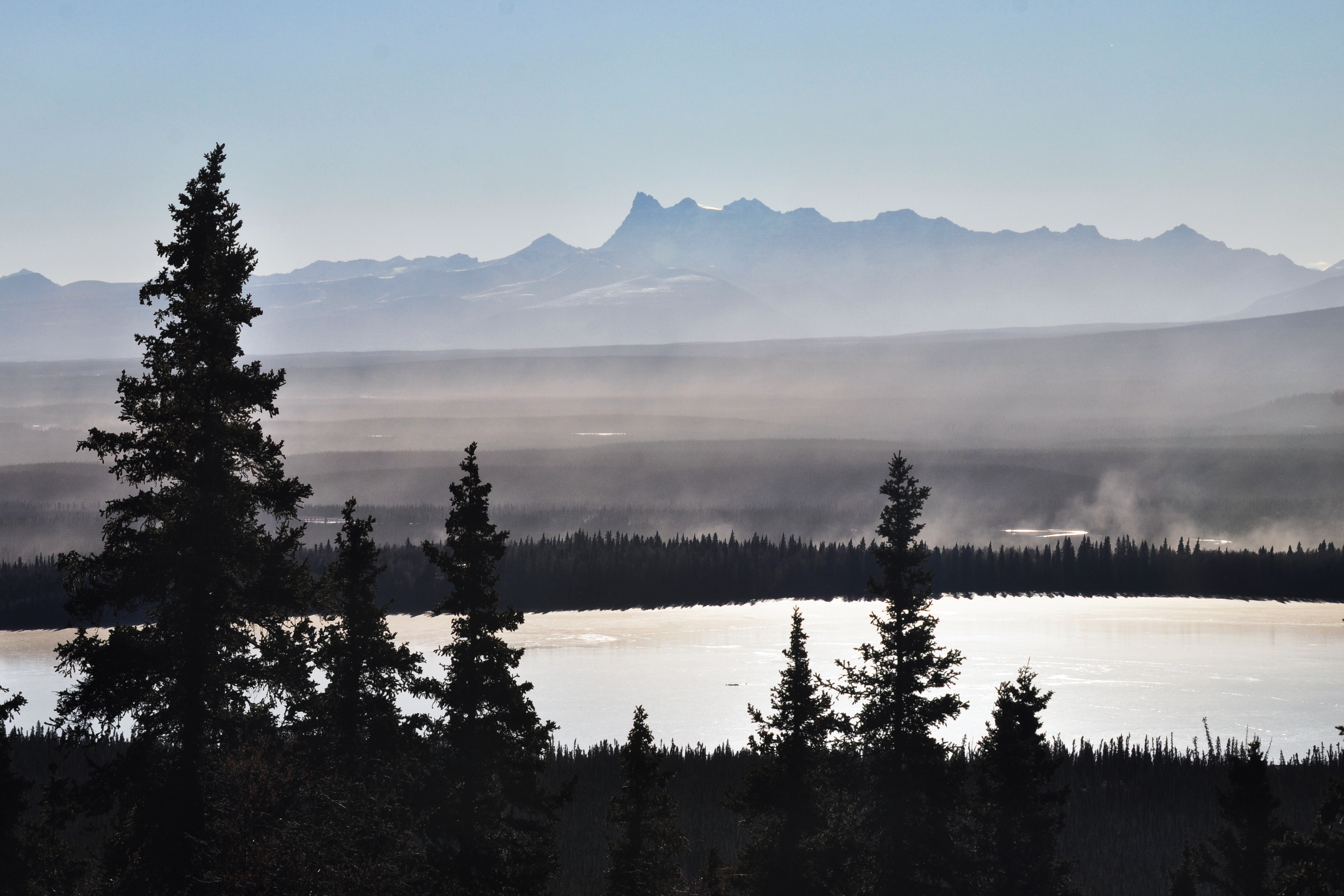
Tanada Peak centered on skyline

== See also ==
- Geography of Alaska
