= National Register of Historic Places listings in Copper River Census Area, Alaska =

Location of the Copper River Census Area in Alaska

This is a list of the National Register of Historic Places listings in Copper River Census Area, Alaska.

This is intended to be a complete list of the properties and districts on the National Register of Historic Places in Copper River Census Area, Alaska, United States. The locations of National Register properties and districts for which the latitude and longitude coordinates are included below, may be seen in a Google map.

There are 18 properties and districts listed on the National Register in the census area, including 1 National Historic Landmark. Another property was once listed but has been removed.

This National Park Service list is complete through NPS recent listings posted November 6, 2026.

== Current listings ==
	Name on the Register	Image	Date listed	Location	City or town	Description
1	Bremner Historic Mining District	Bremner Historic Mining District	June 15, 2000 (#00000659)	Along Golconda Creek, about 47 miles (76 km) southeast of Chitina; 61°01′45″N 143°26′20″W	Chitina	
2	Chisana Historic District	Chisana Historic District	November 29, 1985 (#85002999)	Extending west 0.25 miles (0.40 km) from the southern end of Chisana Airstrip; 62°03′56″N 142°02′49″W	Chisana	
3	Chisana Historic Mining Landscape	Chisana Historic Mining Landscape	May 14, 1998 (#98000436)	Address restricted	Northway	Also partly comprised in Southeast Fairbanks Census Area
4	Chistochina Trading Post		June 13, 1997 (#97000553)	Mile 32 of Tok Cutoff, about 27 miles (43 km) northeast of Gakona; 62°33′54″N 144°40′00″W	Gakona	
5	Chitina Tin Shop	Chitina Tin Shop	June 11, 1979 (#79003763)	Main Street; 61°30′57″N 144°26′25″W	Chitina	
6	Copper River and Northwestern Railway	Copper River and Northwestern Railway	April 24, 1973 (#73002275)	Chitina to Tasnuna River, along western bank of Copper River; 61°20′21″N 144°47′59″W	Chitina	
7	Copper River and Northwestern Railway Bunkhouse and Messhouse		December 5, 2002 (#02001460)	3rd Street; 61°30′55″N 144°26′09″W	Chitina	
8	Dakah De'nin's Village Site		April 9, 1979 (#79003764)	Address restricted	Chitina	
9	Gakona Historic District	Gakona Historic District	February 2, 2001 (#01000024)	Mile 2 of Tok Cutoff-Glenn Highway; 62°18′07″N 145°18′10″W	Gakona	
10	Gakona Roadhouse	Gakona Roadhouse	August 3, 1977 (#77001579)	Mile 2 of Tok Cutoff-Glenn Highway; 62°18′10″N 145°18′15″W	Gakona	Also a contributing property to Gakona Historic District
11	Kansky's		May 16, 1997 (#97000432)	Mile 42 of Nabesna Road, about 2 miles (3.2 km) north of the Nabesna Mine; 62°23′52″N 142°59′45″W	Nabesna	
12	Kennecott Mines	Kennecott Mines	July 12, 1978 (#78003420)	East of Kennicott Glacier, about 6.5 miles (10.5 km) north of McCarthy; 61°31′09″N 142°50′29″W	McCarthy	
13	McCarthy General Store	McCarthy General Store	January 31, 1978 (#78003421)	Southeastern corner of Kennicott Avenue and Skolai Street; 61°25′55″N 142°55′26″W	McCarthy	
14	McCarthy Power Plant		April 26, 1979 (#79003752)	West side of Shushanna Avenue, on McCarthy Creek; 61°25′56″N 142°55′35″W	McCarthy	
15	Nabesna Gold Mine Historic District		May 25, 1979 (#79003755)	Base of White Mountain at end of Nabesna Road; 62°22′18″N 143°00′45″W	Nabesna	
16	Slana Roadhouse	Slana Roadhouse	February 2, 2005 (#04001569)	Mile 1 of Nabesna Road; 62°42′19″N 143°57′50″W	Slana	
17	Tangle Lakes Archeological District		November 12, 1971 (#71001091)	Address restricted	Paxson	
18	Valdez Trail (Copper Bluff Segment)		February 12, 1998 (#98000077)	Mile 106.5 of Richardson Highway; 62°01′20″N 145°21′55″W	Silver Springs	

== Former listings ==
	Name on the Register	Image	Date listed	Date removed	Location	City or town	Description
1	Sourdough Lodge	Sourdough Lodge	October 1, 1974 (#74002264)	March 5, 1993	Mile 147.5 of Richardson Highway; 62°31′44″N 145°31′02″W	Gakona	Destroyed by fire in 1992.

== See also ==
- List of National Historic Landmarks in Alaska
- National Register of Historic Places listings in Alaska
