= McCarthy House =

McCarthy House may refer to:

== United States ==
(by state then city)

- Judge Charles P. McCarthy House, Boise, Idaho, listed on the National Register of Historic Places (NRHP) in Ada County
- Patrick F. McCarthy House, Davenport, Iowa, NRHP-listed in Scott County
- John McCarthy House, Edgerton, Kansas, listed on the NRHP in Johnson County
- Margaret McCarthy Homestead, Big Prairie, Montana, listed on the NRHP in Flathead County
- McCarthy Homestead Cabin, in Glacier National Park near West Glacier, Montana, NRHP-listed
- McCarthy-Platt House, Reno, Nevada, listed on the NRHP in Washoe County
- McCarthy House (Virginia City, Nevada), NRHP-listed in Storey County
- Timothy C. and Katherine McCarthy House, Madison, Wisconsin, listed on the NRHP in Dane County

== See also ==
- McCarthy Building (disambiguation)
