= Chistochina Trading Post =

- U.S. National Register of Historic Places
- Alaska Heritage Resources Survey
- Location within Alaska
- Location: Mile 32 of Tok Cutoff, about 27 miles (43 km) northeast of Gakona
- Nearest city: Gakona, Alaska
- Coordinates: 62°33′54″N 144°40′00″W
- Area: less than one acre
- Built: 1931
- NRHP reference No.: 97000553
- AHRS No.: GUL-044
- Added to NRHP: June 13, 1997

The Chistochina Trading Post was a historic roadhouse at mile marker 32 of the Tok Cutoff in the Copper River Census Area of southeastern Alaska. It consisted of a connected series of log structures, whose main block is two stories high. The main block, which housed traveler accommodations, is connected to a larger single-story structure, which houses the dining room and bar area. A trading post is believed to have been standing here since as early as 1917; the main lodge was built in 1931. owned and operated by Sarah Endres.

The roadhouse was listed on the National Register of Historic Places in 1997. It was destroyed by fire in 1999.

== See also ==
- National Register of Historic Places listings in Copper River Census Area, Alaska
