= TKJ =

TKJ may refer to:

- Tok Junction Airport, an airport in Alaska
- JR-Central Transport Service Company, a railway company in Japan
- TKJ, the Indian Railways station code for Tilak Bridge railway station, New Delhi, India
