= Kansky's =

- U.S. National Register of Historic Places
- Alaska Heritage Resources Survey
- Location within Alaska
- Location: Mile 42 of Nabesna Road, about 2 miles (3.2 km) north of Nabesna Mine
- Nearest city: Nabesna, Alaska
- Coordinates: 62°23′52″N 142°59′45″W
- Area: less than one acre
- Built: 1934
- Built by: Steve Kanski
- NRHP reference No.: 97000432
- AHRS No.: NAB-100
- Added to NRHP: May 16, 1997

Kansky's, also known as Kanski's, Big Skookum, is a former boarding house, now used as a hunting lodge, located at mile 42 of the Nabesna Road in Wrangell–St. Elias National Park and Preserve of eastern Alaska. The property includes log cabins, bunkhouses, and storage buildings, which were built in 1934 by Steve Kanski to provide lodging and travel services to road crews and workers at the nearby mines. The two businesses that currently run in Nabesna, Alaska are owned by the Ellis family. Ellis Big Game Guides operates out of the original Kansky Lodge. Devils Mountain Lodge is located adjacent as a Bed&Breakfast and hunting lodge independently. The property, a private in-holding within the bounds of the national park, is now operated as a hunting lodge.

The property was listed on the National Register of Historic Places in 1997.

== See also ==
- National Register of Historic Places listings in Wrangell–St. Elias National Park and Preserve
- National Register of Historic Places listings in Copper River Census Area, Alaska
