= Slana Roadhouse =

- U.S. National Register of Historic Places
- U.S. Historic district
- Alaska Heritage Resources Survey
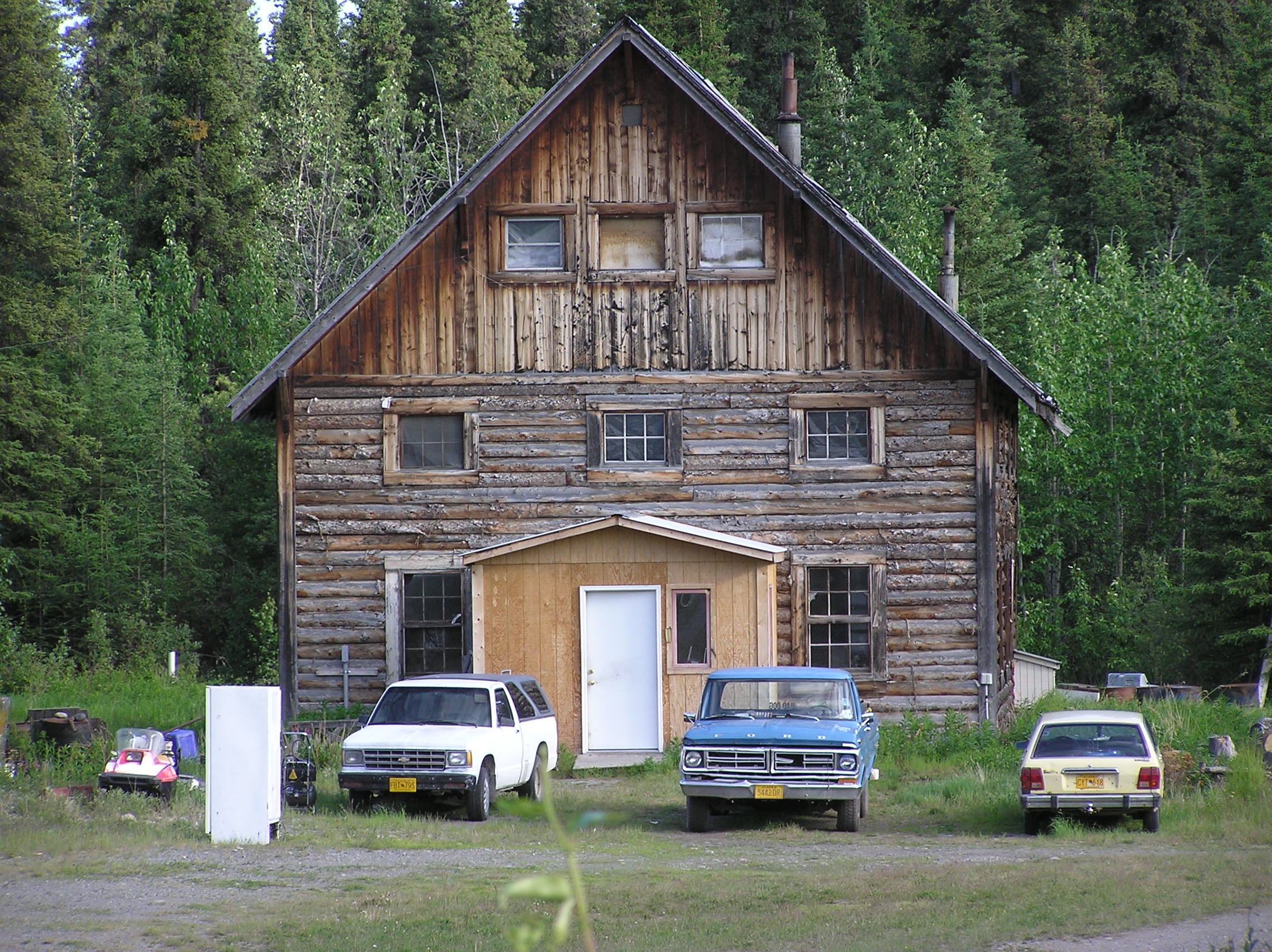
- Photo from 2008

- Location within Alaska
- Location: Mile 1 of Nabesna Road
- Nearest city: Slana, Alaska
- Coordinates: 62°42′19″N 143°57′50″W
- Area: 5 acres (2.0 ha)
- Built: 1928
- Built by: Lawrence DeWitt
- NRHP reference No.: 04001569
- AHRS No.: NAB-00356
- Added to NRHP: February 2, 2005

The Slana Roadhouse, on Nabesna Road in Slana, Alaska, in the Copper River Census Area, is a historic site dating to 1928. The site was listed on the National Register of Historic Places in 2005. The listing included four contributing buildings on 5 acres (2.0 ha).

The roadhouse building is a log building about 32 by 45 feet (9.8 m × 13.7 m) in dimension, and was built by homesteader Lawrence DeWitt in 1928 near the Slana River. The building replaced a smaller, older roadhouse building. The community of Slana grew around it, and, in 2004, included a post office, an elementary school, stores, and more with a population of 50–100. It was deemed significant of one of few surviving pre-World War II roadside stops that used to be located about 30 miles apart on the Nabesna Road and other remote roadways in Alaska. The roadhouse operated from 1928 to 1953 when the Glenn Highway was relocated to about a mile away; in 2004 it was a residence of Lawrence DeWitt's son.

== See also ==
- National Register of Historic Places listings in Copper River Census Area, Alaska
