= Sourdough Lodge =

- Formerly listed on the U.S. National Register of Historic Places
- Former U.S. National Historic Landmark
- Alaska Heritage Resources Survey
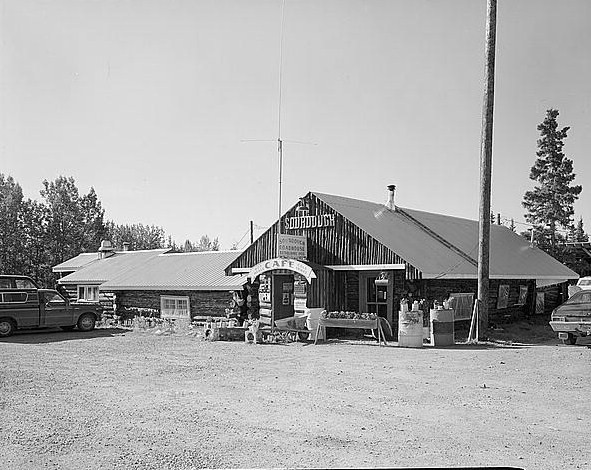

- Location within Alaska
- Location: Mile 147.5 of Richardson Highway
- Nearest city: Gakona, Alaska
- Coordinates: 62°31′44″N 145°31′02″W
- Built: 1903
- NRHP reference No.: 74002264
- AHRS No.: GUL-056

Significant dates
- Added to NRHP: October 1, 1974
- Designated NHL: June 2, 1978
- Removed from NRHP: March 5, 1993
- Delisted NHL: June 3, 1994

The Sourdough Lodge (originally known as Hart's Road House) was built in Alaska between 1903 and 1905 of logs. It was one of a number of roadhouses built along the Valdez Trail (now known as the Richardson Highway). The roadhouses were about 15 miles (24 km) apart and offered shelter for travelers and road construction crews. It was designated a National Historic Landmark on June 2, 1978 as it was the oldest continuously-operating roadhouse in Alaska.

It was destroyed by fire in 1992, leading to the withdrawal of its National Historic Landmark status in 1993. In 1994, the lodge was delisted from the National Register of Historic Places.

== See also ==
- National Register of Historic Places listings in Copper River Census Area, Alaska
