= Gakona Historic District =

Historic district in Alaska, United States

- U.S. National Register of Historic Places
- U.S. Historic district
- Alaska Heritage Resources Survey
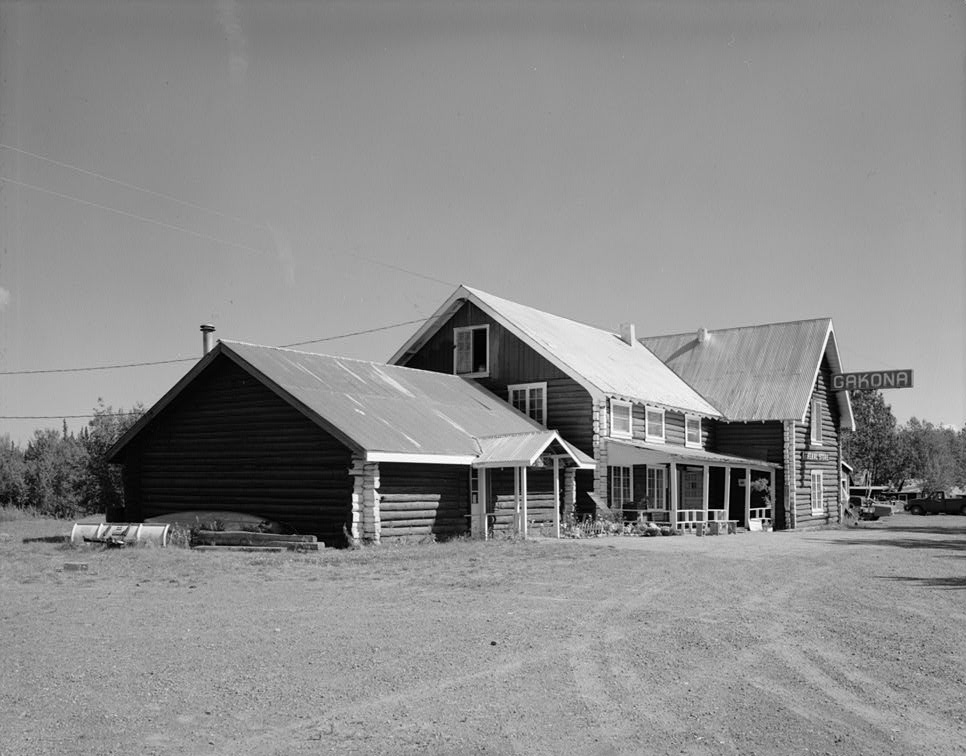

- Location within Alaska
- Location: Mile 2, Tok Cutoff-Glenn Hwy, Gakona, Alaska
- Coordinates: 62°18′07″N 145°18′10″W
- Area: 7 acres (2.8 ha)
- Built: 1904
- NRHP reference No.: 01000024
- AHRS No.: GUL-00240
- Added to NRHP: February 2, 2001

The Gakona Historic District encompasses the historic settlement of Gakona, Alaska, which was established as a stagecoach stop on what is now the Glenn Highway in eastern Alaska. The district includes the original Gakona Roadhouse, dating to 1904, and a cluster of buildings around the 1926–28 Gakona Lodge just to its south: two cabins, a horse barn, carriage house, bar, and house. All but two of these are of log construction, and most were built either c. 1904 or 1926–28, when the highway was rebuilt to a higher standard.

The district was listed on the National Register of Historic Places in 2001.

== Contributing Properties ==
The historical district contains a total of 11 contributing properties, built between 1904 and 1942:

- Cabin One, 62°18′07″N 145°18′02″W, built 1930–1931.
- Cabin Two, 62°18′08″N 145°18′04″W, built 1930–1931.
- Carriage House, 62°18′08″N 145°18′07″W, built 1929.
- Trapper's Den Bar, 62°18′08″N 145°18′09″W, built 1942.
- Gakona Lodge (the present Gakona Roadhouse) 62°18′09″N 145°18′12″W, built 1926–1928.
- Garage, 62°18′09″N 145°18′15″W, built 1942.
- Storage Shed, 62°18′10″N 145°18′13″W, built 1904.
- Ice House, 62°18′10″N 145°18′14″W, built 1904.
- Gakona Roadhouse, 62°18′10″N 145°18′15″W, built 1904.
- Horse Barn, 62°18′08″N 145°18′17″W, built 1910.
- Henra Sundt House, 62°18′07″N 145°18′18″W, built 1927–1928.

== See also ==
- National Register of Historic Places listings in Copper River Census Area, Alaska
