= Dakah De'nin's Village Site =

Archaeological site in Alaska, United States

- U.S. National Register of Historic Places
- Location: Address restricted
- Nearest city: Chitina, Alaska
- Area: 5 acres (2.0 ha)
- NRHP reference No.: 79003764
- Added to NRHP: April 9, 1979

The Dakah De'nin's Village Site is an archaeological site near Chitina, Alaska. The site, first identified in 1971 and excavated in 1973, is named for an Ahtna clan chief who the local people believe lived there. Materials recovered at the site include glass trade beads dating to the early 19th century. Dendrochronological analysis of wood used in house construction at the site also yield dates consistent with occupation between about 1810 and 1830. The site includes a feature consisting of five stone slabs, which is consistent with oral tradition concerning the grave site of Dakah De'nin's.

The site was listed on the National Register of Historic Places in 1979.

== See also ==
- National Register of Historic Places listings in Copper River Census Area, Alaska
