= Chisana, Alaska =

Chisana Tsetsaan' Na'
- CDP
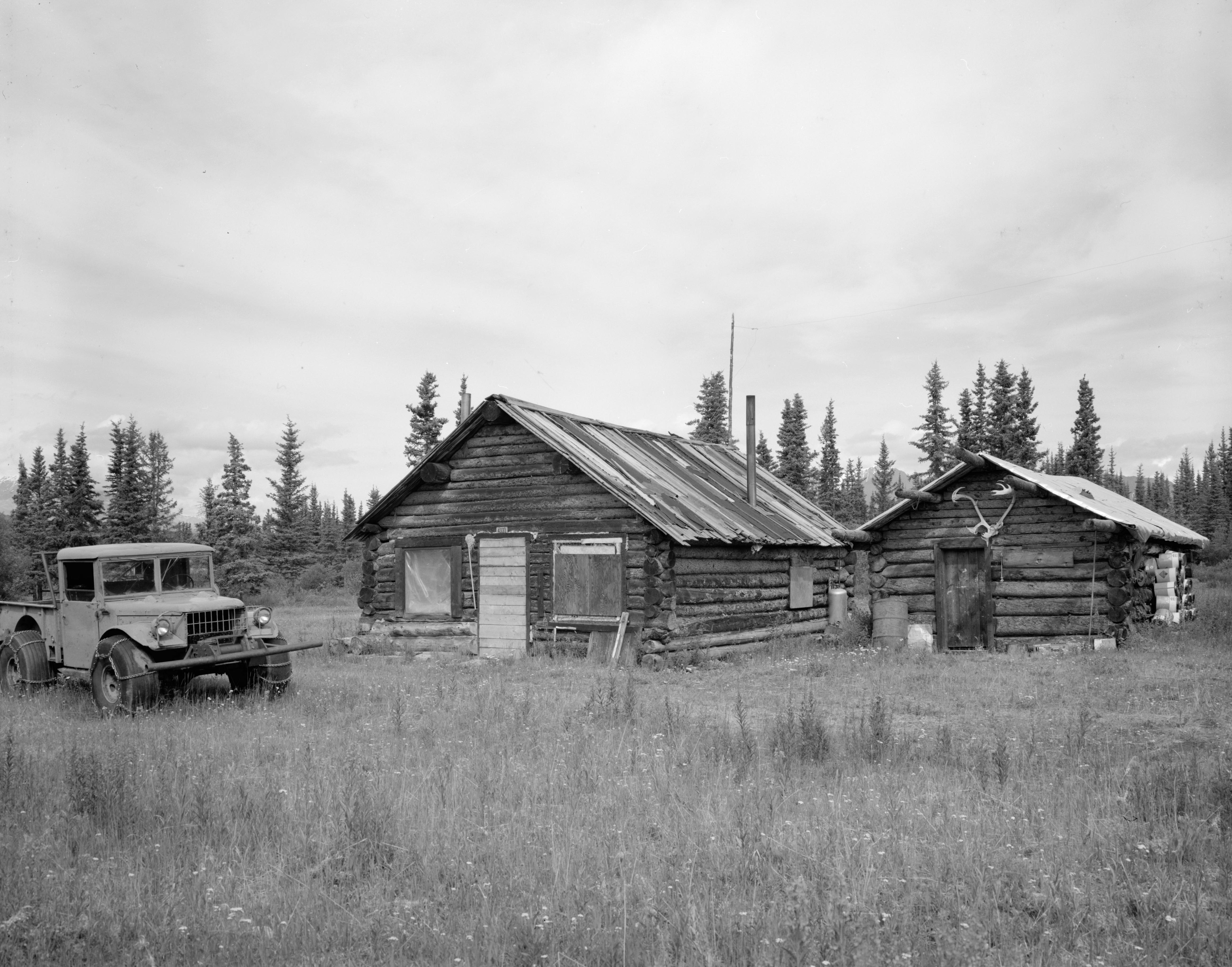
- Chisana's post office

- Location within the state of Alaska
- Coordinates: 62°03′58″N 142°02′27″W
- Country: United States
- State: Alaska
- Census Area: Copper River

Government
  - State senator: Click Bishop (R)
  - State rep.: Mike Cronk (R)

Area
  - Total: 79.44 sq mi (205.74 km^{2})
  - Land: 79.39 sq mi (205.61 km^{2})
  - Water: 0.050 sq mi (0.13 km^{2})
- Elevation: 3,369 ft (1,027 m)

Population (2020)
  - Total: 0
  - Density: 0/sq mi (0/km^{2})
- Time zone: UTC-9 (Alaska (AKST))
  - Summer (DST): UTC-8 (AKDT)
- Area code: 907
- FIPS code: 02-13890
- GNIS feature ID: 1400321

- Chisana Historic District
- U.S. National Register of Historic Places
- U.S. Historic district
- Alaska Heritage Resources Survey
- Location: Extending west 0.25 miles (0.40 km) from the southern end of Chisana Airstrip
- Nearest city: Northway
- Coordinates: 62°03′56″N 142°02′49″W
- Area: 30 acres (12 ha)
- Built: 1913
- NRHP reference No.: 85002999
- AHRS No.: NAB-042

Significant dates
- Added to NRHP: November 29, 1985
- Designated AHRS: 1984

- Chisana Historic Mining Landscape
- U.S. National Register of Historic Places
- U.S. Historic district
- Location: Address restricted
- Nearest city: Northway
- Area: 27,216 acres (11,014 ha)
- Built: 1913
- NRHP reference No.: 98000436
- Added to NRHP: May 14, 1998

Chisana (also Shushanna) (Tsetsaan' Na in Ahtna) is a census-designated place (CDP) in the Copper River Census Area in the U.S. state of Alaska. As of the 2020 census, Chisana had a population of 0. The English name Chisana derives from the Ahtna Athabascan name Tsetsaan' Na, meaning literally "copper river" (not to be confused with the river known in English as the Copper River). The Chisana River joins the Nabesna River just north of Northway Junction, Alaska, to form the Tanana River, a major tributary of the Yukon River. The Chisana Airport consists of a turf and gravel runway which is largely serviced by flights from Tok, Alaska.

In 1985, the community was listed as Chisana Historic District on the National Register of Historic Places as a historic district.

In 1998 the Chisana Historic Mining Landscape historic district, comprising the community and a wide 27,000 acres (11,000 ha) area located partly in Copper River Census Area and partly in Southeast Fairbanks Census Area, was listed on the National Register of Historic Places.

== Geography ==
According to the United States Census Bureau, the CDP has a total area of 86.7 square miles (225 km^{2}), of which 86.7 square miles (225 km^{2}) is land and 0.1 square miles (0.26 km^{2}) is water. The total area is 0.10% water.

== Climate ==
According to the Köppen Climate Classification system, Chisana has a subarctic climate, abbreviated "Dfc" on climate maps. The hottest temperature recorded in Chisana was 90 °F (32.2 °C) on June 19–20, 2004, while the coldest temperature recorded was −53 °F (−47.2 °C) on January 7, 2013.

Climate data for Chisana, Alaska, 2006–2020 normals, extremes 1992–present
Month	Jan	Feb	Mar	Apr	May	Jun	Jul	Aug	Sep	Oct	Nov	Dec	Year
Record high °F (°C)	53 (12)	53 (12)	63 (17)	68 (20)	79 (26)	90 (32)	87 (31)	89 (32)	75 (24)	74 (23)	45 (7)	55 (13)	90 (32)
Mean maximum °F (°C)	33.9 (1.1)	41.0 (5.0)	47.3 (8.5)	57.4 (14.1)	70.8 (21.6)	77.6 (25.3)	80.1 (26.7)	78.3 (25.7)	67.8 (19.9)	55.7 (13.2)	31.9 (−0.1)	31.5 (−0.3)	81.8 (27.7)
Mean daily maximum °F (°C)	2.2 (−16.6)	17.7 (−7.9)	28.1 (−2.2)	44.4 (6.9)	56.9 (13.8)	64.8 (18.2)	68.9 (20.5)	64.5 (18.1)	54.0 (12.2)	35.8 (2.1)	10.8 (−11.8)	2.9 (−16.2)	37.6 (3.1)
Daily mean °F (°C)	−8.1 (−22.3)	1.3 (−17.1)	8.3 (−13.2)	27.1 (−2.7)	41.7 (5.4)	49.7 (9.8)	53.4 (11.9)	48.7 (9.3)	39.3 (4.1)	21.9 (−5.6)	−0.2 (−17.9)	−5.9 (−21.1)	23.1 (−5.0)
Mean daily minimum °F (°C)	−18.2 (−27.9)	−15.1 (−26.2)	−11.5 (−24.2)	9.8 (−12.3)	26.4 (−3.1)	34.5 (1.4)	37.8 (3.2)	32.9 (0.5)	24.5 (−4.2)	7.9 (−13.4)	−11.2 (−24.0)	−14.5 (−25.8)	8.6 (−13.0)
Mean minimum °F (°C)	−40.4 (−40.2)	−36.1 (−37.8)	−32.6 (−35.9)	−11.0 (−23.9)	15.1 (−9.4)	24.0 (−4.4)	27.1 (−2.7)	22.2 (−5.4)	9.9 (−12.3)	−15.3 (−26.3)	−32.1 (−35.6)	−33.7 (−36.5)	−46.3 (−43.5)
Record low °F (°C)	−53 (−47)	−52 (−47)	−49 (−45)	−39 (−39)	2 (−17)	19 (−7)	24 (−4)	16 (−9)	−5 (−21)	−31 (−35)	−44 (−42)	−49 (−45)	−53 (−47)
Average precipitation inches (mm)	0.53 (13)	0.57 (14)	0.37 (9.4)	0.25 (6.4)	1.02 (26)	3.22 (82)	2.55 (65)	1.54 (39)	1.10 (28)	0.80 (20)	0.70 (18)	0.60 (15)	13.25 (335.8)
Average extreme snow depth inches (cm)	15.4 (39)	18.3 (46)	18.7 (47)	17.7 (45)	8.1 (21)	0.0 (0.0)	0.0 (0.0)	0.0 (0.0)	1.1 (2.8)	4.9 (12)	12.3 (31)	15.4 (39)	20.3 (52)
Average precipitation days (≥ 0.01 in)	3.7	4.4	3.2	1.9	5.6	12.3	9.4	9.6	5.7	5.3	4.5	3.7	69.3
Source 1: NOAA
Source 2: National Weather Service

== Demographics ==
Historical population
Census	Pop.	Note	%±
1920	148		—
1930	13		−91.2%
1940	28		115.4%
2000	0		—
2010	0		—
2020	0		—
U.S. Decennial Census

Chisana first appeared on the 1920 U.S. Census as an unincorporated community. It appeared twice more in 1930 and 1940. It would not appear again until 2000, when it was made a census-designated place (CDP). However, in both 2000 and 2010, it reported no residents.

== See also ==
- National Register of Historic Places listings in Wrangell-St. Elias National Park and Preserve
- National Register of Historic Places listings in Copper River Census Area, Alaska
- National Register of Historic Places listings in Southeast Fairbanks Census Area, Alaska
