= Copper River and Northwestern Railway Bunkhouse and Messhouse =

- U.S. National Register of Historic Places
- Alaska Heritage Resources Survey
- Location within Alaska
- Location: Third Street, Chitina, Alaska
- Coordinates: 61°30′55″N 144°26′09″W
- Area: less than one acre
- Built: 1910
- Built by: Copper River & Northwestern Railway
- NRHP reference No.: 02001460
- AHRS No.: VAL-00310
- Added to NRHP: December 5, 2002

The Copper River and Northwestern Railway Bunkhouse and Messhouse are historic railroad worker facilities on Third Street in Chitina, Alaska. The messhouse is a single-story wood-frame structure with a hip roof, measuring 26 by 30 feet (7.9 m × 9.1 m). It has a porch on the east side, and a timber-braced entrance on the west side leading to a root cellar under the building. The bunkhouse is also a single-story structure, measuring 43 by 25 feet (13.1 m × 7.6 m). It has an enclosed porch on its southern facade, and is divide internally into two large chambers. These facilities were built in 1910 by the Copper River and Northwestern Railway to house its work crews, a service they performed until the railroad shut down in 1938. They are the only surviving elements of what was once a larger CR&NW presence in the community. The buildings are now hosting the Chitina House bed and breakfast.

The buildings were listed on the National Register of Historic Places in 2002.

== See also ==
- National Register of Historic Places listings in Copper River Census Area, Alaska
