= Native Village of Kluti Kaah =

Alaska Native village

- People: Ahtna
- Headquarters: Copper Center, Alaska, US

The Native Village of Kluti-Kaah is an Alaska federally recognized Alaska Native tribal entity located in Copper Center, Alaska. The village is primarily made up of the Ahtna Athabaskan people, who have been in the Copper River basin from time immemorial.

== History ==
As of 2005, the tribe had 302 enrolled citizens.
