= Nabesna Road =

Highway in Alaska, United States

- Nabesna Road highlighted in red

Route information
- Length: 43.3 mi (69.7 km)
- Existed: 1933–present

Major junctions
- West end: AK-1
- East end: Nabesna

Location
- Country: United States
- State: Alaska

Highway system
- Alaska Routes; Interstate; Scenic Byways

The Nabesna Road is a minor highway in the U.S. state of Alaska that extends 42 miles (68 km) from the Slana River to Nabesna, providing access to some interior components of Wrangell-St. Elias National Park. The entire length of the road is gravel and has few services. Flat tires and washouts are fairly common along the entire length of the road.

== Route description ==
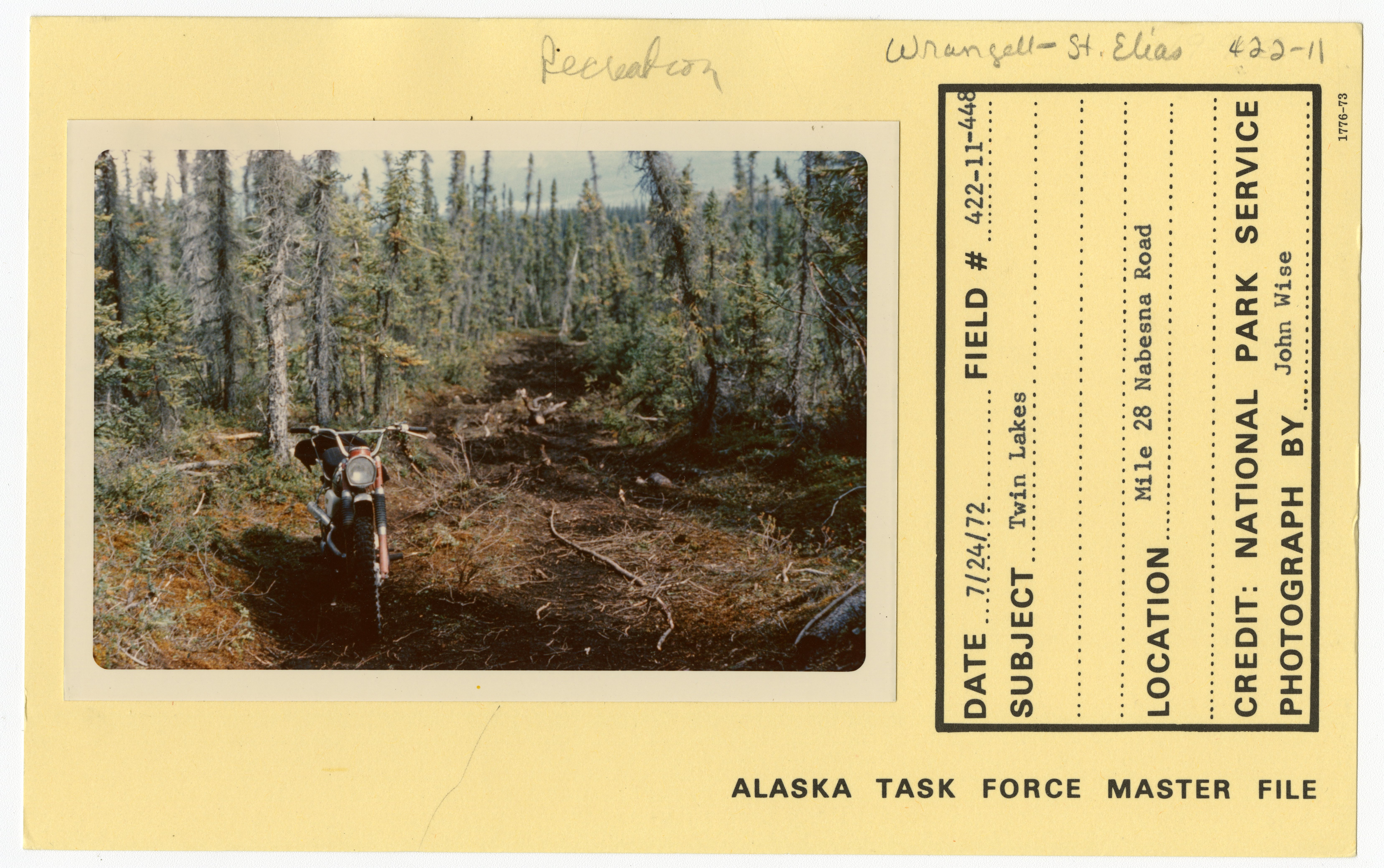
Nabesna Road at mile 28 in 1972

Today, the Alaska Department of Transportation maintains the Nabesna Road and, generally, the road is passable by most two-wheel drive vehicles. However, higher clearance and/or four-wheel drive are occasionally needed beyond Mile 29 due to stream crossings. Wet conditions such as spring run-off and heavy rain can make these stream crossings impassable. The maintained portion of the road ends at a private hunting lodge at mile 42. The last four miles (6 km) of the road are not maintained and may be deeply rutted and wet. Vehicle travel on this portion of the road is not recommended.

The Slana Roadhouse, a historic site dating to 1928, is located on Nabesna Road in Slana.

Motorists may stop at the Slana Ranger Station, mile .5, to check current road conditions and to pick up a Nabesna Road Guide brochure.

== History ==
The Nabesna Road was originally built in 1933 by the Alaska Road Commission to supply Nabesna Mine and to ship out its ore.

== Major intersections ==
Borough	Location	mi	km	Destinations	Notes
Unorganized	Slana	0	0.0	AK-1 (Tok Cut-Off)	Western terminus
Unorganized	Gakona	43.3	69.7	Nabesna Mine	Eastern terminus
1.000 mi = 1.609 km; 1.000 km = 0.621 mi

== See also ==
- Slana Roadhouse
