= Gakona Roadhouse =

- U.S. National Register of Historic Places
- U.S. Historic district – Contributing property
- Alaska Heritage Resources Survey
- Location within Alaska
- Location: Mile 2, Tok Cutoff-Glenn Hwy, Gakona, Alaska
- Coordinates: 62°18′10″N 145°18′15″W
- Area: 0.1 acres (0.040 ha)
- Built: 1904
- Part of: Gakona Historic District (ID01000024)
- NRHP reference No.: 77001579
- AHRS No.: GUL-065

Significant dates
- Added to NRHP: August 3, 1977
- Designated CP: February 2, 2001
- Designated AHRS: September 24, 1974

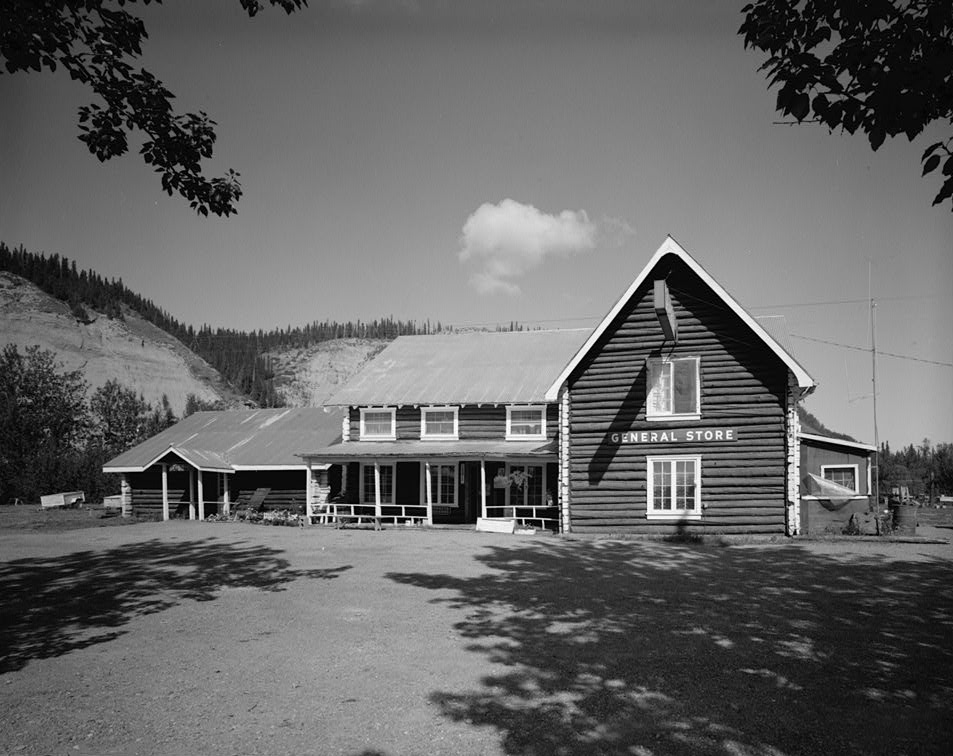
The c. 1929 roadhouse

The Gakona Roadhouse is a historic traveler service facility in Gakona, Alaska, at mile 205 of the Glenn Highway. It is a 1-1/2 log structure with a gabled roof covered in corrugated metal. A shed-roof addition extends to the main block's east side. The roadhouse was built c. 1904, during the construction by the United States Army of the Trans-Alaska Military Road between Valdez and Eagle. This roadhouse was strategically located at a place where that road diverged from the old Eagle Trail, used by miners to reach the gold rush fields of the Yukon River. The original 1904 structure is used for storage; the present roadhouse facilities are provided by later (1920s) structures.

The roadhouse was listed on the National Register of Historic Places in 1977.

== See also ==
- National Register of Historic Places listings in Copper River Census Area, Alaska
