= Valdez Trail-Copper Bluff Segment =

- Valdez Trail (Copper Bluff Segment)
- U.S. National Register of Historic Places
- Location within Alaska
- Location: Mile 106.5 of Richardson Highway
- Nearest city: Silver Springs
- Coordinates: 62°01′20″N 145°21′55″W
- Area: 4.5 acres (1.8 ha)
- Built: 1900
- Built by: U.S. Army; Alaska Road Commission
- MPS: Valdez Trail MPS
- NRHP reference No.: 98000077
- Added to NRHP: February 12, 1998

The Valdez-Trail (Copper Bluff Segment) is an historic early trail in southern Alaska. It is a section of unpaved roadway, eight to ten feet in width, that extends roughly northward from milepost 106.5 of the Richardson Highway, between Copper Center and Glennallen. It is a rare surviving segment of the original Valdez Trail, the first major road built in Alaska, which extends 700 miles (1,100 km) from Valdez into the Alaskan interior. This segment was constructed in 1900 by the Alaska Road Commission, and is now within Wrangell–St. Elias National Park and Preserve. It was listed on the National Register of Historic Places in 1998.

== See also ==
- National Register of Historic Places listings in Copper River Census Area, Alaska
