= Patrick F. McCarthy House =

Historic house in Iowa, United States

- U.S. National Register of Historic Places
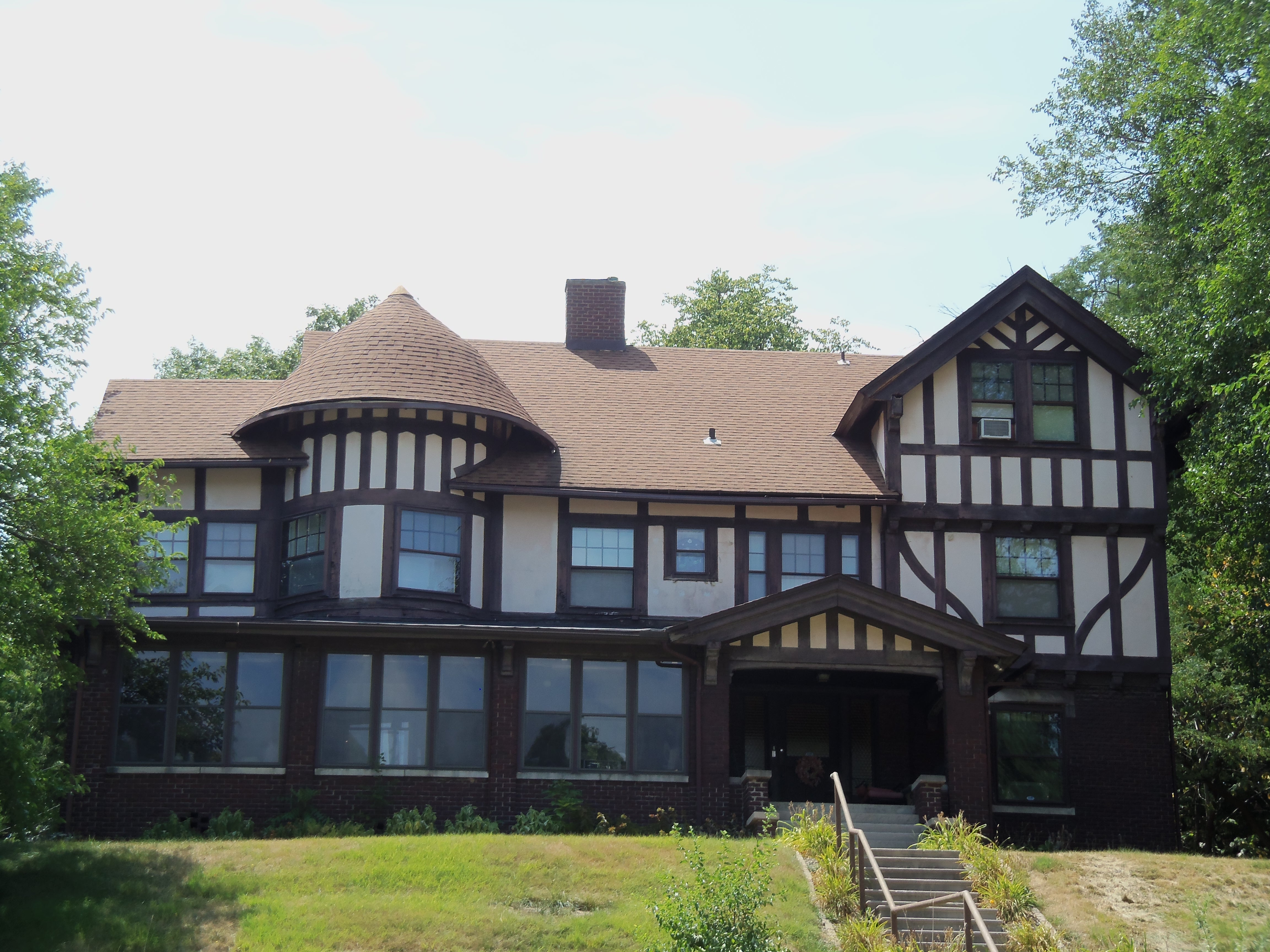

- Location within Iowa Location within the United States
- Location: 942 Marquette St. Davenport, Iowa
- Coordinates: 41°31′46″N 90°35′30″W
- Area: approximately 2 acres (0.81 ha)
- Built: 1905
- Architectural style: Tudor Revival
- MPS: Davenport MRA
- NRHP reference No.: 84001471
- Added to NRHP: July 27, 1984

The Patrick F. McCarthy House is a historic building (as of 1984) located in the West End of Davenport, Iowa, United States. Patrick McCarthy was the president of McCarthy Improvement Co., a local construction company that specializes in building and paving streets. Patrick and his wife Alice had the house built in 1905 and lived there into the 1950s.

The Tudor Revival style residence sits high on a hill above Marquette Street. The first story is covered in dark red face brick, and the second and third floors sport the half-timbering for which the architectural style is known. Another architecture feature is that the upper floors protrude above the floor below. The semi-circular bay is another defining feature.
