= Chisana Airport =

Airport in Alaska, United States

- IATA: CZN; ICAO: none; FAA LID: CZN

Summary
- Airport type: Public
- Owner: Alaska DOT&PF - Northern Region
- Serves: Chisana, Alaska
- Elevation AMSL: 3,318 ft (1,011 m)
- Coordinates: 62°04′16″N 142°02′54″W

Map
- Location of airport in Alaska

Runways
Direction	Length		Surface
Direction	ft	m	Surface
12/30	3,000	914	Turf/gravel

Statistics (2015)
- Aircraft operations: 150 (2014)
- Based aircraft: 0
- Passengers: 105
- Freight: 96,000 lbs
- Source: Federal Aviation Administration

Chisana Airport (IATA: CZN, FAA LID: CZN) is a state-owned public-use airport serving Chisana, a community located in the Copper River Census Area of the U.S. state of Alaska. The National Plan of Integrated Airport Systems for 2011–2015 categorized it as a general aviation facility.

Scheduled airline passenger service at this airport is subsidized by the United States Department of Transportation via the Essential Air Service program.

== Facilities and aircraft ==
Chisana Airport resides at elevation of 3,318 feet (1,011 m) above mean sea level. It has one runway designated 12/30 with a turf and gravel surface measuring 3,000 by 50 feet (914 x 15 m). For the 12-month period ending December 31, 2005, the airport had 150 aircraft operations, an average of 12 per month: 67% general aviation and 33% air taxi.

== Airline and destination ==
The following airline offers scheduled passenger service at this airport:

Airlines	Destinations
40-Mile Air	Tok

=== Statistics ===
Carrier shares: January – December 2013
Carrier	Passengers (arriving and departing)
40-Mile Air	105(100%)

Top domestic destinations: Jan. – Dec. 2013
Rank	City	Airport	Passengers
1	Tok, AK	Tok Airport	50

== See also ==
- List of airports in Alaska
