= Tok Junction Airport =

Airport in Alaska, USA

- IATA: TKJ; ICAO: PFTO; FAA LID: 6K8

Summary
- Airport type: Public
- Owner: Alaska DOT&PF - Northern Region
- Serves: Tok, Alaska
- Elevation AMSL: 1,639 ft / 500 m
- Coordinates: 63°19′46″N 142°57′13″W

Map
- Location of airport in Alaska

Runways
Direction	Length		Surface
Direction	ft	m	Surface
07/25	2,509	765	Asphalt

Statistics (2005)
- Aircraft operations: 2,700
- Based aircraft: 39
- Source: Federal Aviation Administration

Tok Junction Airport (IATA: TKJ, ICAO: PFTO, FAA LID: 6K8) is a state-owned public-use airport located one nautical mile (2 km) east of the central business district of Tok, in the Southeast Fairbanks Census Area of the U.S. state of Alaska.

This airport is included in the FAA's National Plan of Integrated Airport Systems for 2011–2015 which categorized it as a general aviation facility.

== Facilities and aircraft ==
Tok Junction Airport has one runway designated 07/25 with an asphalt surface measuring 2,509 by 50 feet (765 x 15 m).

For the 12-month period ending December 31, 2005, the airport had 2,700 aircraft operations, an average of 225 per month: 56% air taxi and 44% general aviation. At that time there were 39 aircraft based at this airport: 90% single-engine, 8% multi-engine and 3% helicopter.

== Airline and destinations ==
The following airline offers scheduled passenger service at this airport:

Airlines	Destinations
40-Mile Air	Chicken, Chisana, Northway

== Other airports in Tok ==
- Tok Airport (IATA: ~~TKJ~~, ICAO: ~~PATJ~~, FAA LID: ~~TKJ~~) was a state-owned public-use airport located at 63°18′12″N 143°00′04″W, two nautical miles (4 km) south of the central business district of Tok. It has one runway designated 13/31 with a 1,690 by 45 ft (515 x 14 m) gravel and turf surface.
- Tok 2 Airport (FAA LID: 8AK9) is a private-use airport located at 63°18′32″N 143°01′04″W, on the opposite side of Glenn Highway from the Tok Airport. It has one runway designated 10/28 with a 2,035 x 80 ft (620 x 24 m) gravel surface.

== See also ==
- List of airports in Alaska
