= McCarthy House (Virginia City, Nevada) =

Historic house in Nevada, United States

- U.S. National Register of Historic Places
- U.S. Historic district – Contributing property
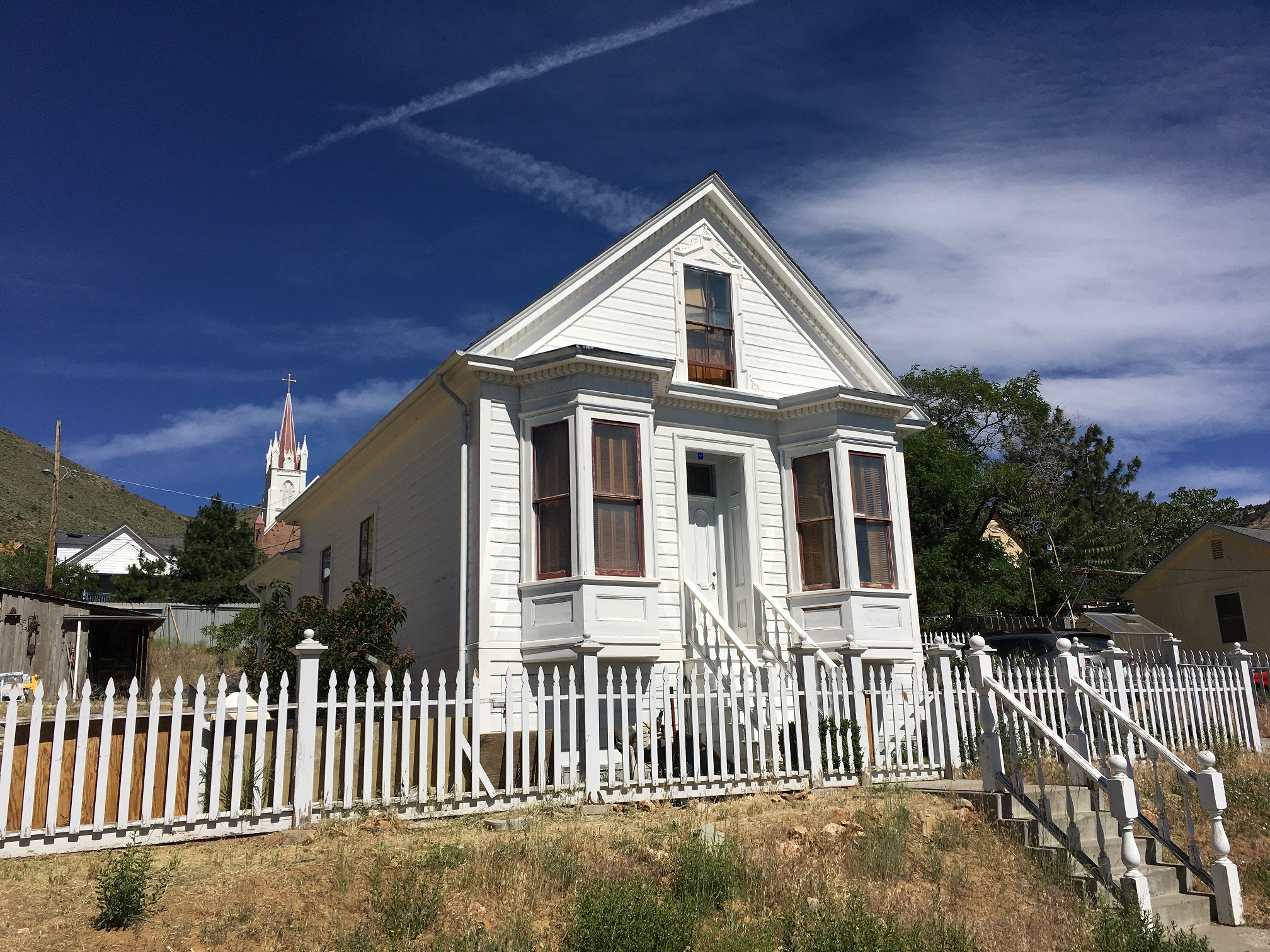

- Location within Nevada Location within the United States
- Location: 50 S. I St., Virginia City, Nevada
- Coordinates: 39°18′29″N 119°38′58″W
- Area: less than one acre
- Built: 1875
- Architect: McCarthy, T.F.; Dwyer, Robert
- Architectural style: Italianate
- Part of: Virginia City Historic District (ID66000458)
- NRHP reference No.: 95001231
- Added to NRHP: October 31, 1995

The McCarthy House in Virginia City, Nevada was built in 1875 before the Virginia City's Great Fire of October 26, 1875 but, downhill from commercial C Street, it survived the fire. It is a gable-front 1 1/2-story house with shiplap siding.

It was listed on the National Register of Historic Places in 1995. It is also included in the Virginia City Historic District, a National Historic Landmark.

The house was occupied by T.F. McCarthy during 1875 to 1914, then vacant from 1914 to 1986.

== Significance ==
The McCarthy House, situated in the middle of an Irish-immigrant locality, is a well-conserved house of the working class. As an expression of a significant ethnic and mining workforce, the house became notable under criterion A. It is noteworthy under criterion C as well, because the Comstock Mining District is an example of the vernacular architecture used for an average working-class house.

== Description ==
The house is built in 1875 in the eastern part of Virginia City. The Comstock Lode was at its peak while it was built. The design of the house shows a Folk Victorian style. It is a one and half-story and wood-framed establishment. It contains a steeply pitched, gabled roof that unites simple elements of the Italianate and Greek-Revival styles. Its exterior has sports matching bay windows on both sides of the entrance. A blacksmith from County Cork, Ireland named Timothy Francis McCarthy brought his nephew with him to use him as a helping hand for the construction work of his house.

The members of the McCarthy family were Timothy, his brother James, his 2nd wife, Frances, their 2 kids, nephew Robert Dwyer and another 2 kids from an earlier marriage. The house had only a living space of 700 square feet for all these family members. The 1st floor of the building had a parlor, kitchen, and 1 large and 2 small bedrooms. The 2nd floor was used as a sleeping space by the McCarthys though it was not completed as a living space. The adjacent woodshed and outhouse of the nineteenth-century event today exist on the site.

The ownership of the house was retained by this family since 1875. From 1915 to 1986, the house remained empty as Timothy went to live with one of his sons in Arizona. In 1986, Timothy's grandson John McCarthy came to live in the house and made some modifications which include the installation of electricity and indoor plumbing, finishing the second story, and rear addition. The McCarthy House is owned by the McCarthy family to date and is not open to the public.
