= Nabesna, Alaska =

Unincorporated community in the state of Alaska, United States

Nabesna Nabaesna’ / Naambia Niign Daacheeg
- census-designated place
- Nabesna
- Location within the state of Alaska
- Coordinates: 62°22′16″N 143°00′50″W
- Country: United States
- State: Alaska
- Census area: Copper River

Government
  - State senator: Click Bishop (R)
  - State rep.: Mike Cronk (R)

Area
  - Total: 160.82 sq mi (416.51 km^{2})
  - Land: 160.26 sq mi (415.06 km^{2})
  - Water: 0.56 sq mi (1.45 km^{2})
- Elevation: 2,979 ft (908 m)

Population (2020)
  - Total: 2
  - Density: 0/sq mi (0/km^{2})
- Time zone: UTC-9 (Alaska (AKST))
  - Summer (DST): UTC-8 (AKDT)
- FIPS code: 02-51960
- GNIS feature ID: 1406770

- Nabesna Gold Mine Historic District
- U.S. National Register of Historic Places
- U.S. Historic district
- Alaska Heritage Resources Survey
- Location: Base of White Mountain at end of Nabesna Road
- Coordinates: 62°22′18″N 143°00′45″W
- Area: 330.6 acres (133.8 ha)
- Built: 1926
- Built by: Carl F. Whitham
- NRHP reference No.: 79003755
- AHRS No.: NAB-011

Significant dates
- Added to NRHP: April 26, 1979
- Designated AHRS: May 1, 1978

Nabesna (Nabaesna’ in Ahtna; Naambia Niign Daacheeg in Upper Tanana) is a census-designated place and unincorporated community in northern Copper River Census Area, Alaska, United States, in the northern part of the Wrangell-St. Elias National Park and Preserve. It lies along the Nabesna Road, a gravel road that connects it to the Tok Cut-Off at Slana. Its elevation is 2,979 feet (908 m). Founded by and named for the Nabesna Mining Company, the community received a post office in 1909. Located at the base of White Mountain in the Wrangell Mountains, it lies west of the Nabesna River. As of the 2020 census, Nabesna had a population of 2.

Gold was discovered at White Mountain in 1891, and the site was first developed in the early 20th century. Through the efforts of Carl Whitham, the Nabesna Mining Company was formed in 1929, resulting in an expansion of the camp and the construction of Nabesna Road. The mine was closed during World War II, and only briefly reopened afterward, closing permanently after Whitham died in 1947. The location was used as a secret supply cache by the United States Army during the Cold War. The mine produced 2.5 short tons (2.3 t) of gold during its active period, as well as many tons of silver, copper, and lead.

The old mining camp, now a ghost town, and the mine were listed as the Nabesna Gold Mine Historic District on the National Register of Historic Places in 1979.

== Demographics ==
Historical population
Census	Pop.	Note	%±
1930	54		—
1940	23		−57.4%
1950	28		21.7%
2010	5		—
2020	2		−60.0%
U.S. Decennial Census

Nabesna first appeared on the 1930 U.S. Census as an unincorporated mining village. It appeared again in 1940 and 1950. It did not appear again until 2010, when it was made a census-designated place (CDP).

The Nabesna mining community is not to be confused with Nabesna native village, which was located west across the Nabesna River from present-day Northway Village (CDP). It also appeared on the 1940 U.S. Census showing 85 residents. There is some confusion as to which Nabesna appeared on the 1960 U.S. Census (showing 41 residents). The native village was reported to have flooded and residents left around 1950. Nabesna was merged with Northway on the 1950 census as "Northway-Nabesna". Some residents had earlier relocated from the native village upriver to the abandoned Reeve Airfield, adjacent to the Nabesna mining community after World War II. Owing to the 1960 U.S. Census map showing Nabesna native village still in existence adjacent to Northway, that is given credence, but further research may be needed due to confirm if this is not erroneous. Nothing remains of that native village as of the 2010s.

== Climate ==
Nabesna has a continental subarctic climate (Köppen Dfc).

Climate data for Nabesna, Alaska, 1991–2020 normals, 1966–2014 extremes: 2920ft (890m)
Month	Jan	Feb	Mar	Apr	May	Jun	Jul	Aug	Sep	Oct	Nov	Dec	Year
Record high °F (°C)	42 (6)	49 (9)	53 (12)	69 (21)	82 (28)	87 (31)	85 (29)	84 (29)	78 (26)	61 (16)	46 (8)	48 (9)	87 (31)
Mean maximum °F (°C)	27.2 (−2.7)	34.2 (1.2)	40.0 (4.4)	53.3 (11.8)	67.6 (19.8)	77.5 (25.3)	77.9 (25.5)	74.9 (23.8)	62.8 (17.1)	47.7 (8.7)	30.3 (−0.9)	28.5 (−1.9)	80.6 (27.0)
Mean daily maximum °F (°C)	2.9 (−16.2)	13.7 (−10.2)	23.3 (−4.8)	41.5 (5.3)	54.4 (12.4)	64.5 (18.1)	65.9 (18.8)	61.3 (16.3)	50.6 (10.3)	31.6 (−0.2)	12.4 (−10.9)	5.8 (−14.6)	35.7 (2.0)
Daily mean °F (°C)	−4.0 (−20.0)	5.7 (−14.6)	13.1 (−10.5)	30.7 (−0.7)	44.2 (6.8)	52.6 (11.4)	55.2 (12.9)	51.4 (10.8)	41.0 (5.0)	24.3 (−4.3)	6.5 (−14.2)	0.3 (−17.6)	26.8 (−2.9)
Mean daily minimum °F (°C)	−10.9 (−23.8)	−2.3 (−19.1)	2.8 (−16.2)	19.9 (−6.7)	33.9 (1.1)	40.8 (4.9)	44.5 (6.9)	41.5 (5.3)	31.3 (−0.4)	17.0 (−8.3)	0.6 (−17.4)	−5.2 (−20.7)	17.8 (−7.9)
Mean minimum °F (°C)	−32.9 (−36.1)	−26.8 (−32.7)	−18.1 (−27.8)	−2.0 (−18.9)	20.7 (−6.3)	30.8 (−0.7)	34.1 (1.2)	29.0 (−1.7)	14.9 (−9.5)	−3.6 (−19.8)	−22.7 (−30.4)	−26.7 (−32.6)	−37.5 (−38.6)
Record low °F (°C)	−48 (−44)	−47 (−44)	−34 (−37)	−20 (−29)	7 (−14)	26 (−3)	22 (−6)	17 (−8)	0 (−18)	−24 (−31)	−40 (−40)	−43 (−42)	−48 (−44)
Average precipitation inches (mm)	0.27 (6.9)	0.24 (6.1)	0.22 (5.6)	0.34 (8.6)	0.91 (23)	2.19 (56)	3.00 (76)	1.65 (42)	1.15 (29)	0.56 (14)	0.55 (14)	0.50 (13)	11.58 (294.2)
Average snowfall inches (cm)	5.5 (14)	6.1 (15)	3.9 (9.9)	4.0 (10)	6.3 (16)	0.6 (1.5)	0.0 (0.0)	0.1 (0.25)	2.6 (6.6)	8.2 (21)	8.7 (22)	6.9 (18)	52.9 (134.25)
Source 1: NOAA
Source 2: XMACIS2 (records, 1981-2010 monthly max/mins & snowfall)

Climate data for Nabesna, Alaska (1966-2014 normals and extremes)
Month	Jan	Feb	Mar	Apr	May	Jun	Jul	Aug	Sep	Oct	Nov	Dec	Year
Record high °F (°C)	42 (6)	49 (9)	53 (12)	69 (21)	82 (28)	87 (31)	85 (29)	84 (29)	78 (26)	61 (16)	46 (8)	48 (9)	87 (31)
Mean daily maximum °F (°C)	1.1 (−17.2)	10.3 (−12.1)	22.6 (−5.2)	40.0 (4.4)	53.4 (11.9)	63.2 (17.3)	65.2 (18.4)	61.5 (16.4)	50.0 (10.0)	29.9 (−1.2)	10.6 (−11.9)	4.9 (−15.1)	34.4 (1.3)
Mean daily minimum °F (°C)	−12.3 (−24.6)	−6.0 (−21.1)	0.6 (−17.4)	16.9 (−8.4)	31.2 (−0.4)	39.6 (4.2)	42.7 (5.9)	39.2 (4.0)	29.3 (−1.5)	14.4 (−9.8)	−3.5 (−19.7)	−8.0 (−22.2)	15.3 (−9.3)
Record low °F (°C)	−48 (−44)	−47 (−44)	−34 (−37)	−20 (−29)	7 (−14)	26 (−3)	22 (−6)	17 (−8)	0 (−18)	−24 (−31)	−40 (−40)	−43 (−42)	−48 (−44)
Average precipitation inches (mm)	0.28 (7.1)	0.41 (10)	0.14 (3.6)	0.28 (7.1)	0.95 (24)	2.19 (56)	3.07 (78)	1.53 (39)	1.13 (29)	0.70 (18)	0.45 (11)	0.35 (8.9)	11.47 (291)
Average snowfall inches (cm)	5.7 (14)	6.8 (17)	3.5 (8.9)	4.1 (10)	5.7 (14)	0.8 (2.0)	0.0 (0.0)	0.2 (0.51)	2.5 (6.4)	8.1 (21)	8.8 (22)	6.9 (18)	53.1 (135)
Source: WRCC

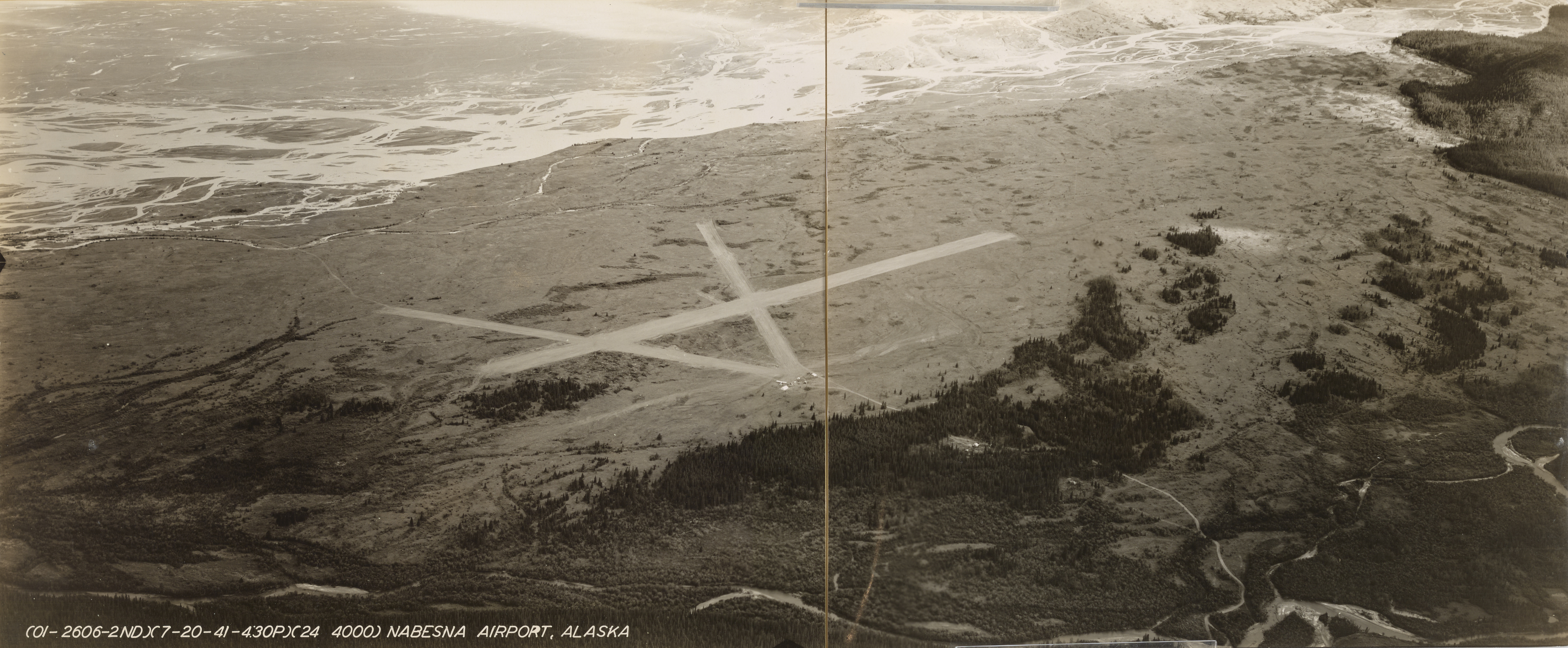
Nabesna, 1941

== See also ==
- National Register of Historic Places listings in Wrangell-St. Elias National Park and Preserve
- National Register of Historic Places listings in Copper River Census Area, Alaska
