= McCarthy General Store =

- U.S. National Register of Historic Places
- Alaska Heritage Resources Survey
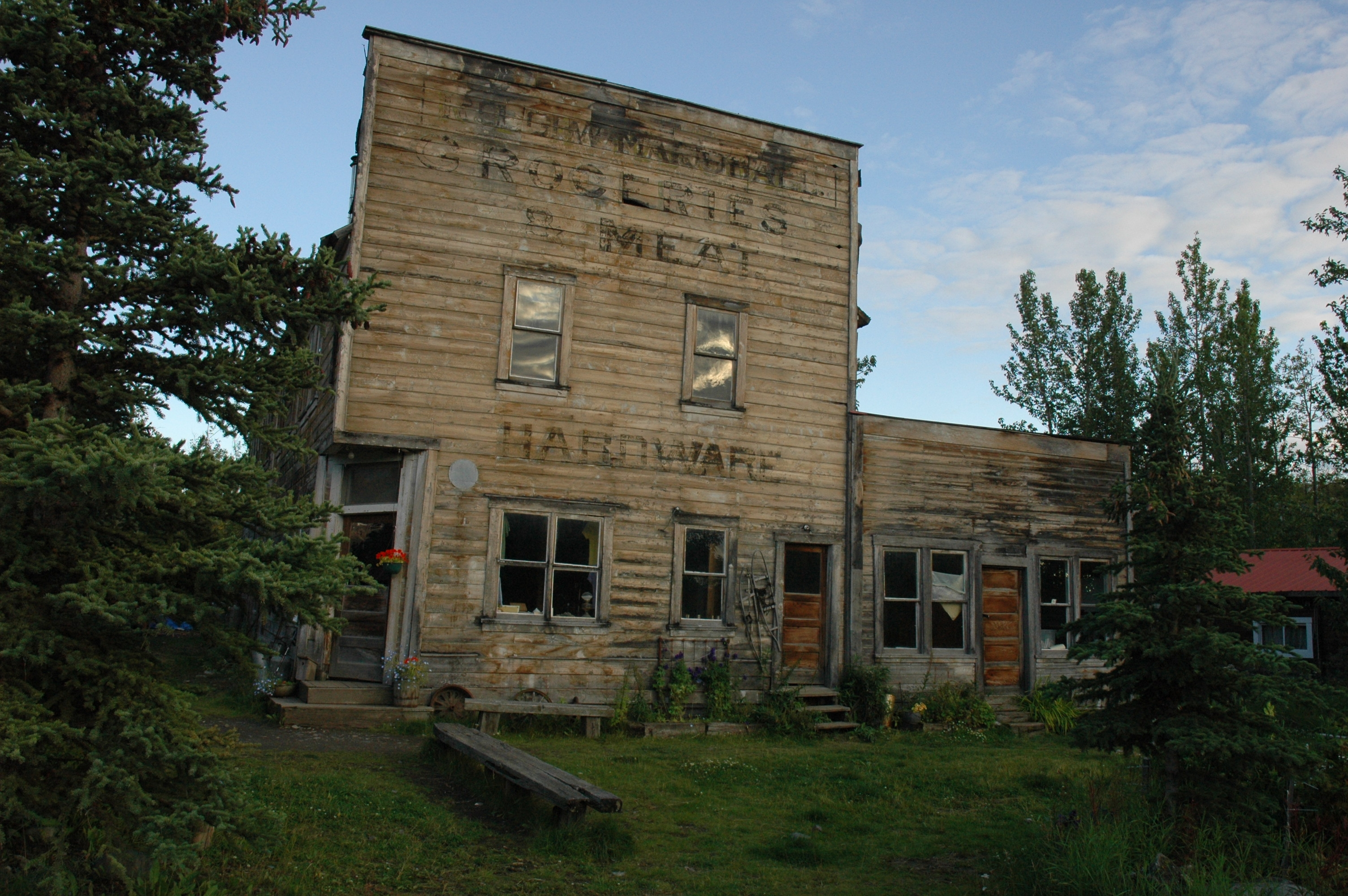

- Location within Alaska
- Location: Southeastern corner of Kennicott Avenue and Skolai Street, McCarthy, Alaska
- Coordinates: 61°25′55″N 142°55′26″W
- Area: 1 acre (0.40 ha)
- Built: 1914
- NRHP reference No.: 78003421
- AHRS No.: XMC-030

Significant dates
- Added to NRHP: January 31, 1978
- Designated AHRS: December 18, 1976

The McCarthy General Store is a historic former general store and boarding house at Kennecott and Skolai Streets in the small community of McCarthy, Alaska, located in the heart of Wrangell-St. Elias National Park and Preserve. At two stories in height and measuring 47 by 56 feet (14 m × 17 m), it is McCarthy's largest building, and one of its oldest. It was built in 1914, during the mining boom at nearby Kennecott. The store occupied the ground floor of the building, and the upper level had eleven rooms for boarders. The building was abandoned after the mining boom ended in the 1930s,.

The building was listed on the National Register of Historic Places in 1978.

== See also ==
- National Register of Historic Places listings in Wrangell-St. Elias National Park and Preserve
- National Register of Historic Places listings in Copper River Census Area, Alaska
