= McCarthy Power Plant =

- U.S. National Register of Historic Places
- Alaska Heritage Resources Survey
- Location within Alaska
- Location: West side of Shushanna Avenue, on McCarthy Creek, McCarthy, Alaska
- Coordinates: 61°25′56″N 142°55′35″W
- Area: less than one acre
- Built: 1917
- Built by: Mother Lode Coalition Mining Company
- NRHP reference No.: 79003752
- AHRS No.: XMC-035

Significant dates
- Added to NRHP: April 26, 1979
- Designated AHRS: November 20, 1977

The McCarthy Power Plant, also known as the Mother Lode Coalition Mining Company Power House and the Mother Lode Plant, is a historic power plant building in the small community of McCarthy, Alaska, in the heart of Wrangell-St. Elias National Park and Preserve. It is a three-story wood-frame structure with a clerestory roof, located on the banks of McCarthy Creek. It was built in 1917, after the arrival of the Copper River and Northwestern Railway in the area kicked off a building boom. The coal-fired power plant was built to provide electricity for the operation of a tramway and other facilities of the Kennecott mines. Most of the transmission lines and the tramway were destroyed by avalanches in 1919, and other changes made soon afterward made the power plant unnecessary, and its turbine was moved up to Kennecott.

The building was listed on the National Register of Historic Places in 1979.

== See also ==
- National Register of Historic Places listings in Wrangell-St. Elias National Park and Preserve
- National Register of Historic Places listings in Copper River Census Area, Alaska
