= Tok Airport =

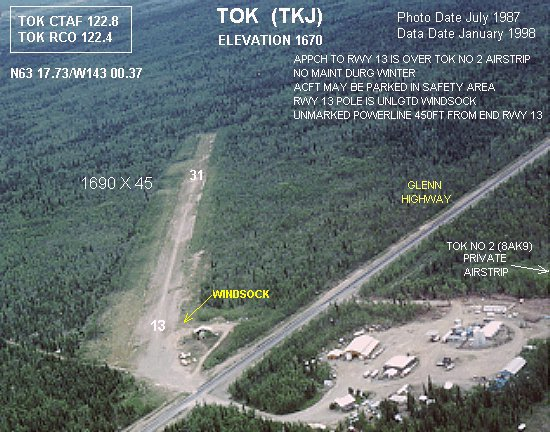
- IATA: TKJ; ICAO: PATJ; FAA LID: TKJ

Summary
- Airport type: Public
- Owner: Alaska DOT&PF - Northern Region
- Serves: Tok, Alaska
- Elevation AMSL: 1,670 ft / 509 m
- Coordinates: 63°18′12″N 143°00′04″W

Map
- Location of airport in Alaska

Runways
Direction	Length		Surface
Direction	ft	m	Surface
13/31	1,690	515	Gravel/Turf

Statistics (2005)
- Aircraft operations: 600
- Based aircraft: 17
- Source: Federal Aviation Administration

Tok Airport (IATA: TKJ, ICAO: PATJ, FAA LID: TKJ) was a state-owned public-use airport located two nautical miles (4 km) south of the central business district of Tok, in the Southeast Fairbanks Census Area of the U.S. state of Alaska.

== Facilities and aircraft ==
Tok Airport has one runway designated 13/31 with a 1,690 by 45 ft (515 x 14 m) gravel and turf surface. For the 12-month period ending December 31, 2005, the airport had 600 aircraft operations, an average of 50 per month: 83% general aviation and 17% air taxi. At that time there were 17 aircraft based at this airport, all single-engine.

== Other airports in Tok ==
- Tok Junction Airport (IATA: TKJ, ICAO: PFTO, FAA LID: 6K8) is state-owned public-use located at 63°19′46″N 142°57′13″W, one nautical mile (2 km) east of the central business district of Tok. It has one runway designated 7/25 with a 2,509 x 50 ft (765 x 15 m) asphalt surface.
- Tok 2 Airport (FAA LID: 8AK9) is a private-use airport located at 63°18′32″N 143°01′04″W, on the opposite side of Glenn Highway from the Tok Airport. It has one runway designated 10/28 with a 2,035 x 80 ft (620 x 24 m) gravel surface.
