= Timothy J. McCarthy Building =

- U.S. National Register of Historic Places
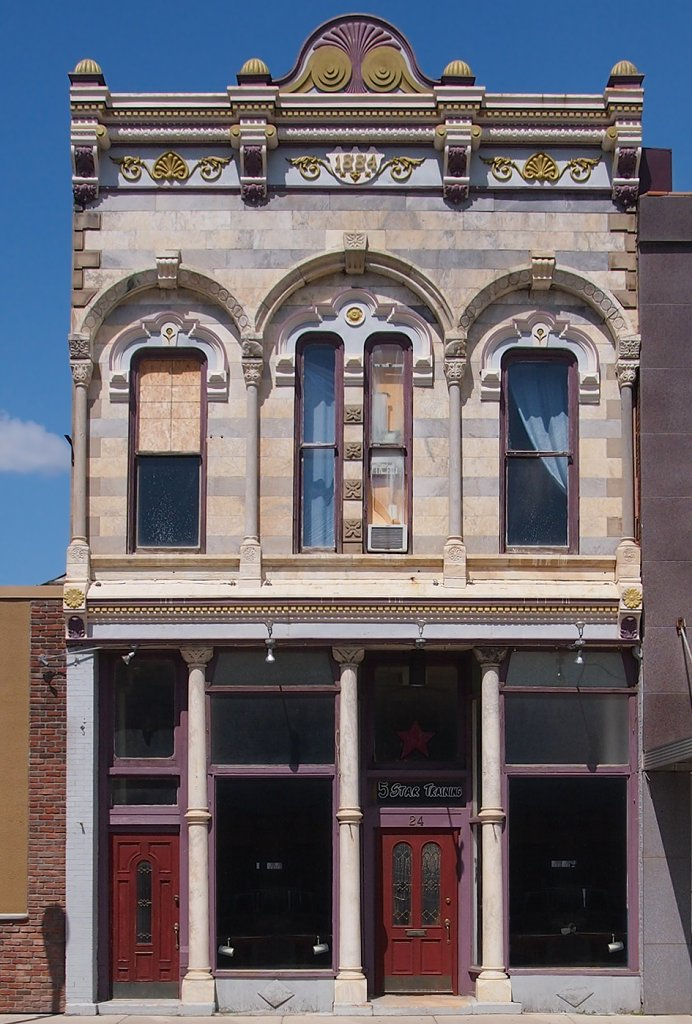
- The building from the south

- Location within Minnesota Location within the United States
- Location: 24 3rd St. NW, Faribault, Minnesota
- Coordinates: 44°17′38″N 93°16′9″W
- Area: less than one acre
- Built: 1884
- Architectural style: Italianate
- NRHP reference No.: 90001161
- Added to NRHP: August 3, 1990

The Timothy J. McCarthy Building (also known as Taft Building or the Marble Front Building) located at 24 3rd Street NW in Faribault, Minnesota.

== Description and history ==
The building was built in 1884 in the Italianate style. Owner T. J. McCarthy had immigrated from Ireland to Faribault, where he attended Shattuck School. McCarthy was the part-owner of a brickyard, and he later purchased the Faribault Marble Works with partner J. H. Nightengale. McCarthy also operated a mortuary in conjunction with his marble and granite business. The building has the only polished marble facade in Faribault.

It was listed on the National Register of Historic Places on August 3, 1990.
