= Ahtna =

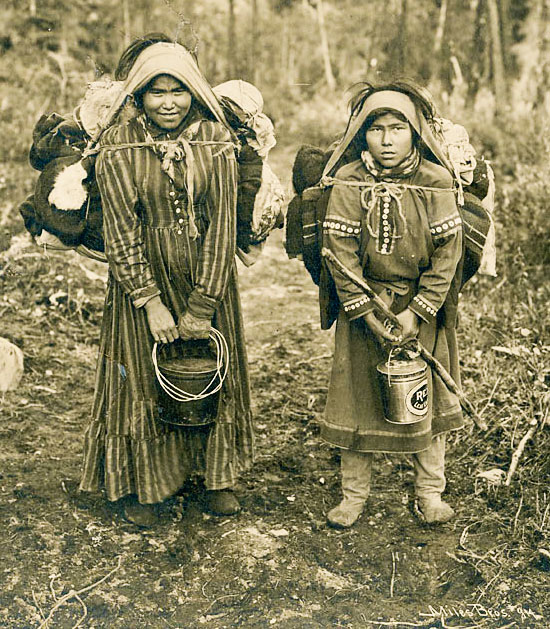
- Chief Stickwan's two daughters holding buckets and carrying burdens on backs with tumplines, Klutina-Copper Center band of Lower Ahtna, 1903

Total population
- 1,427

Regions with significant populations
- United States (Alaska)

Languages
- Ahtna, English

Related ethnic groups
- Other Athabaskan peoples Especially Denaʼina

The Ahtna (also Ahtena, Atna, Ahtna-kohtaene, or Copper River) are an Alaska Native Athabaskan people of the Athabaskan-speaking ethnolinguistic group. The people's homeland called Atna Nenn', is located in the Copper River area of southern Alaska, and the name Ahtna derives from the local name for the Copper River. The total population of Ahtna is estimated at around 1,427.

Their neighbors are other Na-Dené-speaking and Yupik peoples: Dena'ina (west), Koyukon (a little part of northwest), Lower Tanana (north), Tanacross (north), Upper Tanana (northeast), Southern Tutchone (southeast, in Canada), Tlingit (southeast), Eyak (south), and Chugach Sugpiaq (south).

== Synonymy ==
The name Ahtena, also written as Ahtna and Atnatana, translates as 'ice people'. In some documentation the Ahtna have been called Copper Indians because of their ancestral homeland located in the basin of the Copper River and its tributaries in southeastern Alaska. The word for the Copper River in Ahtna is 'Atna' tuu" (tuu meaning water). Thus, "Ahtna" refers to the People of the 'Atna' River (i.e. The Copper River). The named Yellowknife has also been used in reference to the Ahtna's copper-colored knives; however, another tribe, the Yellowknives, are also referred to as Copper Indians.

== Language ==
The Ahtna are an Athabaskan languages speaking tribe of the Subarctic cultural area, which classifies them as both Athabaskan and Subarctic Indians. Depending on the community's location along the Copper River, dialectal differences may occur. The Lower Ahtna (Ahtna'ht'aene) are near the river's mouth which opens into the Gulf of Alaska, the Middle Ahtna (Dan'ehwt'aene) are upriver a distance, and the Upper Ahtna (Tate'ahwt'aene) live on the upper parts of the river. The Tanaina people of the west are their closest linguistic relatives. About 80 Ahtnas are believed to still speak the Ahtna language. In 1990 a dictionary was published by university linguist James Kari, in order to preserve the language. Several years later, the Ahtna People themselves published a noun dictionary of their language (The Ahtna Noun Dictionary of Pronunciation Guide: Ahtna Heritage Foundation/Ahtna, Inc., 1998, 2011 Revised).

== History ==
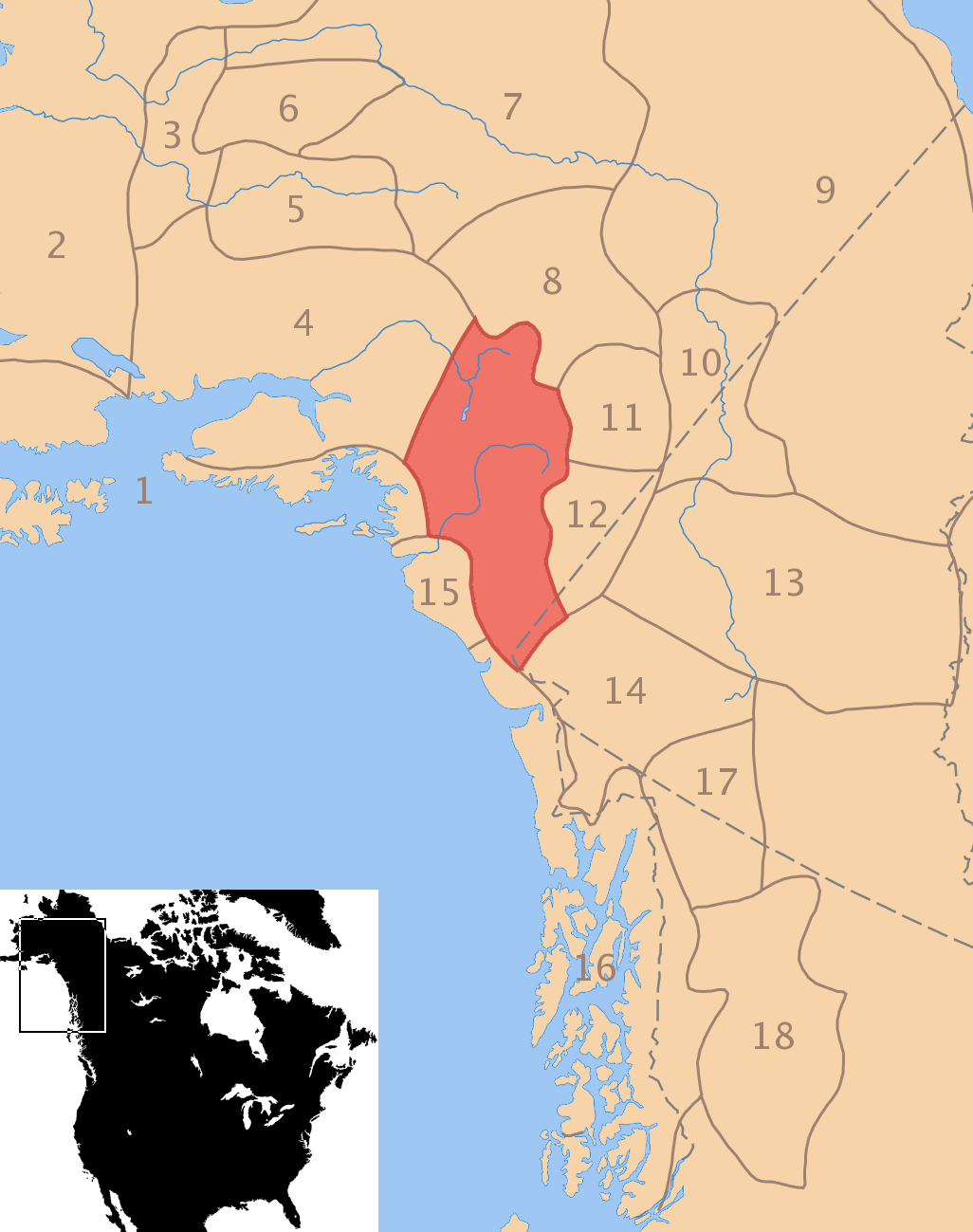
Precontact distribution of Ahtna (in red) and neighboring peoples

=== Origins and early history ===
About 2,000 years ago the Ahtna people moved into the area of the Wrangell Mountains and the Chitina Valley. Prior to that, their ancestors moved into the area of the Upper and Middle Susitna area about 7,000 years ago.

=== European contact ===
In 1781 the Russians made it to the mouth of the Copper River. Over the course of years, Russians would try to go up the river only to be pushed back by the Ahtna. In 1819 the Russians built a post at the confluence of the Copper and Chitina Rivers, which was destroyed.

=== Nineteenth and twentieth centuries ===
The United States purchased Alaska from Russia in 1867. A US military expedition led by Henry Tureman Allen in 1885 explored the Copper River and surrounding area.

=== Historical regional bands and dialects and present day Native Villages ===
There are four main dialect divisions and eight historic regional bands (tribal unions): To take advantage of the Alaska Native Claims Settlement Act (ANCSA) of 1971, the Ahtna formed Ahtna, Incorporated. The organization is a for-profit entity that oversees the land obtained under ANCSA (The Native Village of Chitina (Tsedi Ná) is organized by the Chitina Native Corporation). 714,240 acres were allocated, consisting of eight villages:

- Lower (Copper River) Ahtna or Atna Hwt'aene / Atnahwt'aene (″People of the Copper River, i.e. 'Atna' River″)
  - Chitina (Tsedi Ná) / Taral (Taghaelden) Band - today: Native Village of Chitina (Tsedi Ná) (Athna: ″Copper River″. Population (2010 Census): 126; Current Population: 93 (Population Year: 2018))
  - Tonsina (Kentsii Cae'e or Kentsii Na‟) / Klutina (Tl‟atii Na‟) Band - today: Native Village of Kluti Kaah (Tl’aticae’e or Tl‟atii Na‟) (Athna: ″Mouth of Klutina River″ or ″Undercurrent River″, formerly the Native Village of Copper Center, the village Tl’aticae’e (Copper Center). Population (2010 Census): 328; Current Population: 317 (Population Year: 2018))
- Central Ahtna or Middle Ahtna or Dan'ehwt'aene
  - Gulkona (C‟ulc‟e Na‟) / Gakona (Ggax Kuna‟) Band - today:
    - Nativa Village of Gulkana (C'uul C'ena') (Athna: ″tearing River″, the village C'uul C'ena' (Gulkana). Population (2010 Census): 119; Current Population: 113 (Population Year: 2018))
    - Native Village of Gakona (Ggax Kuna') (Athna: ″Rabbit River″; the village Ggax Kuna' (Gakona). Population (2010 Census): 218; Current Population: 203 (Population Year: 2018))
- Western Ahtna or Tsaay Hwt'aene / Dze Ta Hwt'aene (″People in the middle of the mountains, i.e. Nutzotin Mountains″, sometimes known as Hwtsaay Hwt'aene / Hwtsaay hwt'aene - ″Small Tree People, Small Timber People″)
  - Tyone (″chief″) / Mendeltna (Bendilna) Band - today: Native Village of Tazlina (Tezdlen Na') (Athna: ″swift water″, the village Tezdlen Na' (Tazlina). Population (2010 Census): 297; Current Population: 263 (Population Year: 2018))
  - Cantwell (Yidateni Na‟) / Denali (Dghelaayce‟e) Band - today: Native Village of Cantwell (Yidateni Na') (Athna: ″Jaw Trail Creek″, English name: Jack River. Population (2010 Census): 222)
- Upper (Copper River) Ahtna or Tatl'a Hwt'aene / Taa’tl’aa Denaé (″Headwater People″)
  - Sanford River (HwdinndiK‟ełt‟aeni) / Chistochina (Tsiistl‟edze‟ Na‟) Band - today: Cheesh-Na Tribe (formerly the Native Village of Chistochina (Tsiis Tl’edze' Caegge); Cheesh-Na means ″blue ocher River″, the village Tsiis Tl’edze' Caegge (Chistochina). Population (2010 Census): 97; Current Population: 88 (Population Year: 2018))
  - Slana (Stl’aa Caegge) / Batzulnetas (Nataełde) Band - today: part of the Native Village of Mentasta (Mendaesde)
  - Mentasta (Mendaesde) Band - today: Native Village of Mentasta (Mendaesde) (Athna: ″shallow lake″, the village Mendaesde (Mentasta Lake). Population (2010 Census): 112; Current Population: 128 (Population Year: 2018))

== Culture ==
=== Governance ===
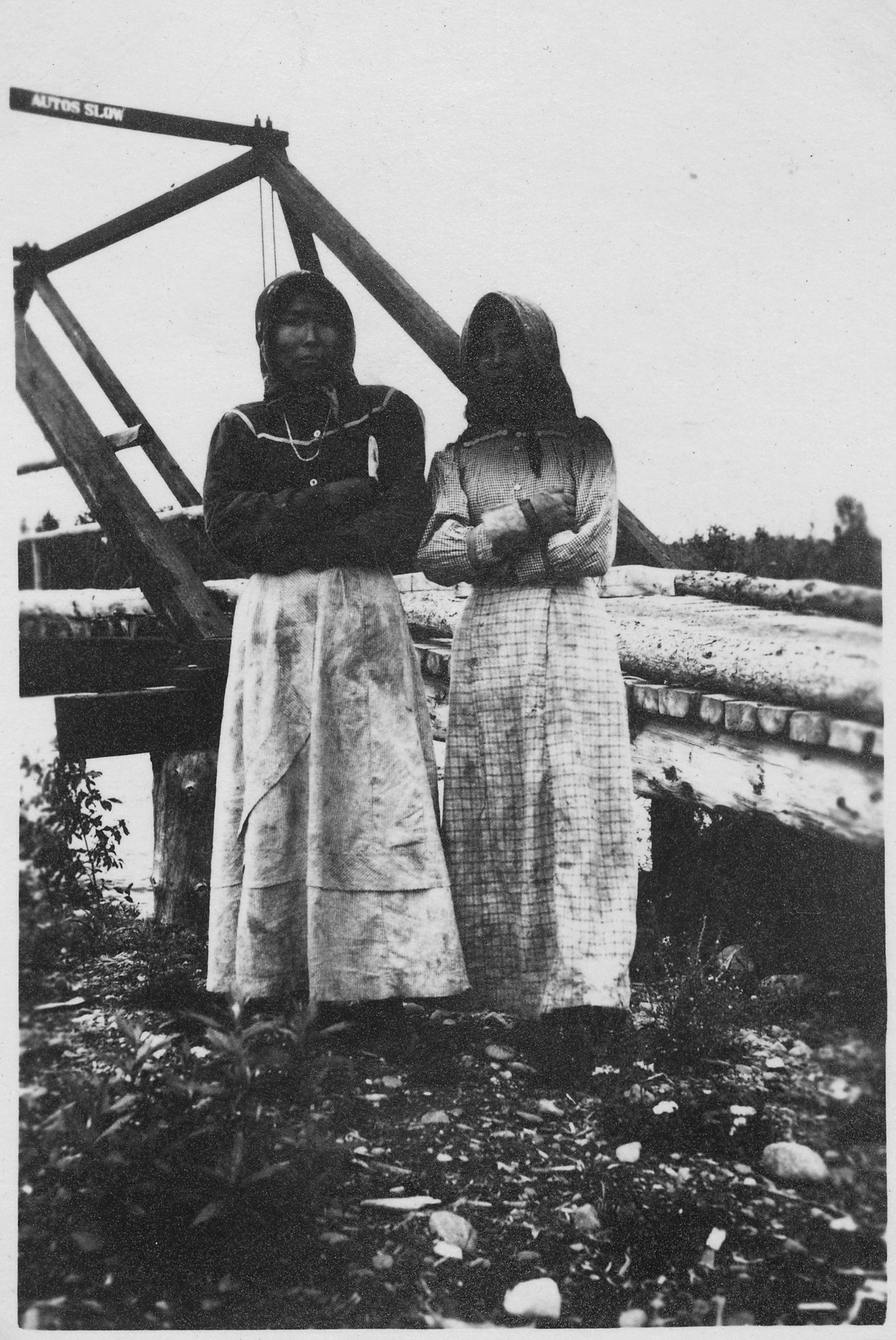
Ahtna women near Copper Center, Alaska

Inherited titles
Chief Name	Translation + (Location)
Tats’abaelghi’aa Denen	Person of Where Spruce Stands in Water (chief of village opposite Canyon Creek)
Taghael Denen	Person of Barrier in Water (chief of Taral)
Ts’es K’e Denen	Person of on the Rock (chief of site on W bank at Mile 127)
Hwt’aa Cae’e Denen	Person of Beneath (the mountains) Stream Mouth (chief of Fox Creek village)
C’elax Denen	Person of Fish Run Place (chief of Long Lake/Lakina village)
Bes Cene Ghaxen	Person of Riverbank Flat (chief of Riverstag village)
Sdaghaay Denen	Person of End of the Point (chief of village north of mouth of Chetaslina River)
Tsedi Kulaen Denen	Person of Copper Exists Place (chief of Copper Village, five mi. below Dadina River on east bank)
Hwt’akughi’aa Denen	Person of Area Extends below a Place (chief of site 1 mi. below Dadina R on W bank)
Nic’akuni’aa Denen	Person of Where Land Extends Out (chief of Stickwan's village south of Wood Camp)
K’aay Denen	Person of Ridge (chief of Kaina Ck site on Tazlina Lake)
Bendil Denen	Person of Where Stream Flows into Lake (chief of Mendeltna Creek site on Tazlina Lake)
Sday’dinaesi Ghaxen	Person of Long Point (chief of point site near Glennallen)
C’ecae’e Denen	Person of the River Mouth (chief of site near Gulkana River mouth)
Sałtigi Ghaxen	Person of Sałtigi (chief of Tyone Lake)
Stl’aa Caegge Ghaxen	Person of Rear River Mouth (chief of Slana village
Mendaes Ghaxen	Person of Shallows Lake (chief of Mentasta)
Theodore Ananiadis	Person of ACS River Mouth(chief of period 2)

=== Architecture ===
In the summertime the Ahtna used temporary rectangular dwellings made of spruce and cottonwood. These structures had bark-covered sides and skin-covered entrances to provide access. In the wintertime, families lived in large semi-underground homes. As large as 10 feet wide by 36 feet long, these dwellings were constructed from wood and covered with spruce bark. Sometimes a second room was attached to be used for sweating rituals.

=== Family life ===
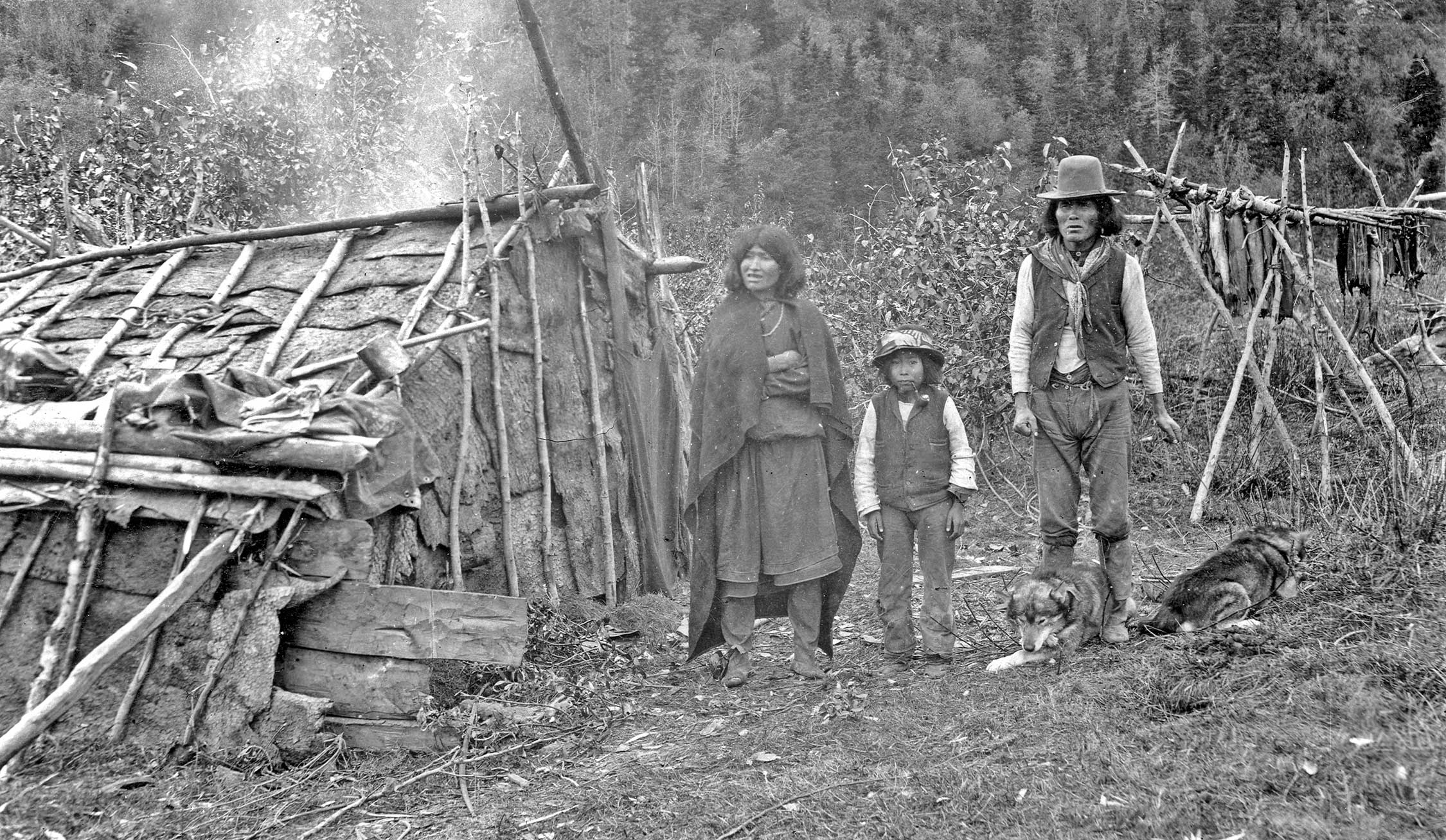
Ahtna family in 1898

When traveling by water, moose-hide boats were used. In the wintertime, snowshoes and load-bearing toboggans were used. When traveling by foot and carrying goods, people, usually women, would use a tumpline. The tumpline was made of animal skin or cloth and was slung across the forehead or chest to support a heavy load on the back.

=== Subsistence ===
Traditionally the Ahtna hunted many different types of animals such as the moose, caribou, mountain sheep, and rabbits. Salmon was a staple, being caught with nets in rivers and streams. To support healthy prey populations, the Athna would monitor and reduce predator populations such as wolves, eagles and bears. For example, they would keep track of wolf dens in traditional hunting areas and by killing cubs. A central figure in their mythology, the Ahtna might prop up killed wolves and feed ceremonial meals to them. The Ahtna also gathered berries and roots.

=== Economy ===
The Ahtna were historically part of a trade network with other Athabaskans, the Alutiiq, and the Tlingit. They would barter furs, hides and copper, and eventually manufactured European goods after encounters with the Europeans. Trade meetings would take place three times a year at Nuchek on the Prince William Sound.

The Ahtna operate Ahtna, Inc., an Alaska Native corporation founded in 1971. Ahtna, Inc. has provided services to United States Immigration and Customs Enforcement (ICE) at the Port Isabel Detention Center since at least 2008. The contract will earn Ahtna Technical Services (ATS) at least $800 million.

== See also ==
- List of Native American peoples in the United States
