= Slana River =

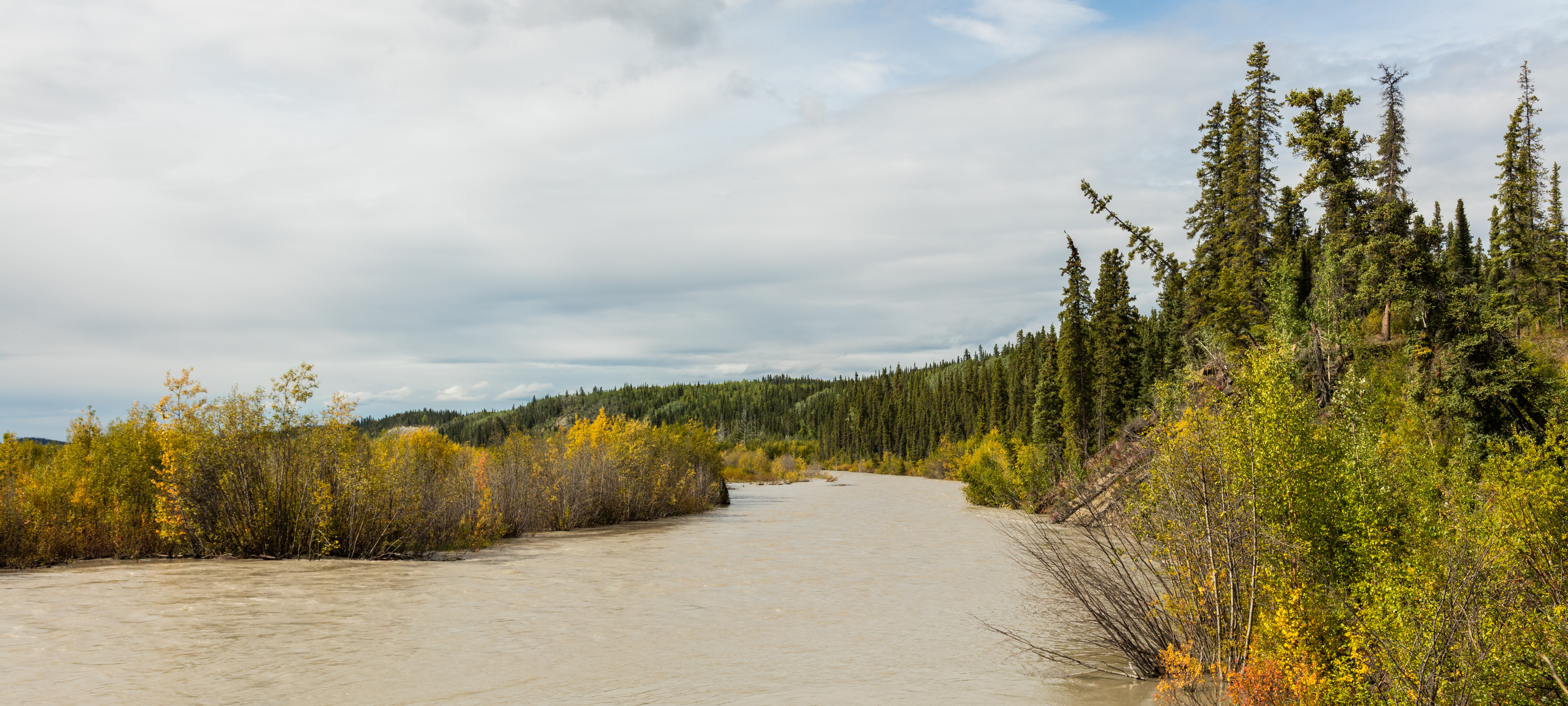

- Location of the mouth of the Slana River in Alaska

Location
- Country: United States
- State: Alaska
- Census Area: Southeast Fairbanks, Copper River

Physical characteristics
- Source: Alaska Range
  - location: near Mount Kimball, Southeast Fairbanks Census Area
  - coordinates: 63°08′00″N 144°27′11″W
  - elevation: 5,141 ft (1,567 m)
- Mouth: Copper River
  - location: Slana, Copper River Census Area
  - coordinates: 62°42′00″N 144°00′30″W
  - elevation: 2,103 ft (641 m)
- Length: 55 mi (89 km)

The Slana River, also known as Slahna, Slakna, or Sla River, is a 55-mile (89 km) tributary of the Copper River in southern Alaska in the United States. It begins near Mount Kimball in the Alaska Range and flows generally south to meet the larger river near Slana.

Its Native American name was first recorded in 1885 by Henry Tureman Allen.

Tributaries of the Slana River include the Athell Creek, Rufus Creek, Porcupine Creek, Natat Creek, Suslota Creek, Carlson Creek, Suslotina Creek, Slana Slough, Mabel Creek, Granite Creek, Jack Creek, and Alteration Creek.

The first miles of the river are through a narrow valley, but nearer to the mouth it becomes wider and meanders a lot. Between Slana River and Little Tok River lies Mentasta Lake and the Mentasta Pass. Other passes near the Slana are Gillett Pass towards the Dry Tok River, and Sikonsina Pass, towards Burnt Lake and the Big Tok River.

== See also ==
- List of rivers of Alaska
