= Slana, Alaska =

Slana Stl’ana’
- CDP
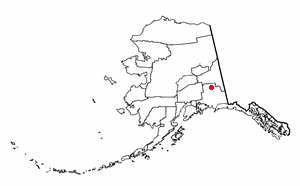
- Location of Slana, Alaska
- Coordinates: 62°41′51″N 143°49′46″W
- Country: United States
- State: Alaska
- Census Area: Copper River

Government
  - State senator: Click Bishop (R)
  - State rep.: Mike Cronk (R)

Area
  - Total: 253.67 sq mi (657.00 km^{2})
  - Land: 252.80 sq mi (654.76 km^{2})
  - Water: 0.86 sq mi (2.24 km^{2})

Population (2020)
  - Total: 116
  - Density: 0.47/sq mi (0.18/km^{2})
- Time zone: UTC-9 (Alaska (AKST))
  - Summer (DST): UTC-8 (AKDT)
- Area code: 907
- FIPS code: 02-70930

Slana /ˈslænə/ (Ahtena: Stl’ana’) is a census-designated place (CDP) in the Copper River Census Area in the Unorganized Borough of the U.S. state of Alaska. As of the 2020 census, the population of the CDP was 116, down from 147 in 2010.

== History ==
Slana is an Alaska Native village name, derived from the name of the river Slana. The Nabesna Mine opened in 1923, which employed 60 people at its height. Over thirty different minerals were extracted from this site, although gold was the primary source of profit. It operated sporadically through the late 1940s. Slana developed rapidly in the 1980s when homesteads were offered for settlement by the federal government.

Slana grew around the Slana Roadhouse, which is listed in the U.S. National Register of Historic Places.

== Geography and climate ==
Slana is located in Sec. 29, T011N, R008E, Copper River Meridian in the Chitina Recording District.

Slana stretches along the Nabesna Road, which runs south of the Tok Cut-Off at mile 63 (km 101). It lies at the junction of the Slana and Copper rivers, 85 kilometers (53 mi) southwest of Tok. Slana experiences a continental subarctic climate (Köppen Dfc), with long, cold winters, and relatively warm summers. Temperature extremes range from −57 to 93 °F (−49.4 to 33.9 °C). Snowfall averages 55.4 inches (1.41 m), with total precipitation of 15.35 inches or 389.9 millimeters per year.

According to the United States Census Bureau, the CDP has a total area of 253.8 square miles (657 km^{2}), of which, 252.9 square miles (655 km^{2}) of it is land and 0.9 square miles (2.3 km^{2}) of it (0.37%) is water.

Climate data for Slana
Month	Jan	Feb	Mar	Apr	May	Jun	Jul	Aug	Sep	Oct	Nov	Dec	Year
Record high °F (°C)	48 (9)	47 (8)	54 (12)	70 (21)	86 (30)	93 (34)	90 (32)	89 (32)	82 (28)	66 (19)	48 (9)	54 (12)	93 (34)
Mean daily maximum °F (°C)	5 (−15)	17.1 (−8.3)	27.3 (−2.6)	42.3 (5.7)	56.1 (13.4)	67.1 (19.5)	68.5 (20.3)	64.5 (18.1)	53.1 (11.7)	35 (2)	15.4 (−9.2)	8.3 (−13.2)	38.3 (3.5)
Mean daily minimum °F (°C)	−11.7 (−24.3)	−4.4 (−20.2)	1.8 (−16.8)	17.5 (−8.1)	30.7 (−0.7)	40.5 (4.7)	44.3 (6.8)	39.6 (4.2)	30.5 (−0.8)	16.1 (−8.8)	−1.8 (−18.8)	−9 (−23)	16.2 (−8.8)
Record low °F (°C)	−57 (−49)	−47 (−44)	−36 (−38)	−24 (−31)	0 (−18)	23 (−5)	30 (−1)	20 (−7)	−1 (−18)	−33 (−36)	−47 (−44)	−51 (−46)	−57 (−49)
Average precipitation inches (mm)	0.65 (17)	0.77 (20)	0.61 (15)	0.43 (11)	1.08 (27)	1.96 (50)	2.75 (70)	2.22 (56)	2.16 (55)	1.05 (27)	0.86 (22)	0.82 (21)	15.35 (390)
Average snowfall inches (cm)	6.8 (17)	6.9 (18)	5.5 (14)	3.9 (9.9)	2 (5.1)	0.1 (0.25)	0 (0)	0 (0)	3.2 (8.1)	9.1 (23)	9.1 (23)	8.8 (22)	55.4 (141)
Average precipitation days	3	3	3	2	5	8	11	9	8	5	4	3	64

== Demographics ==
Historical population
Census	Pop.	Note	%±
1980	49		—
1990	63		28.6%
2000	124		96.8%
2010	147		18.5%
2020	116		−21.1%
U.S. Decennial Census

Slana first appeared on the 1980 U.S. Census as a census-designated place (CDP).

As of the census of 2000, there were 124 people, 62 households, and 31 families residing in the CDP. The population density was 0.5 inhabitants per square mile (0.19/km^{2}). There were 193 housing units at an average density of 0.8 per square mile (0.31/km^{2}). The racial makeup of the CDP was 80.7% White, 13.7% Native American, 0.8% Asian, 2.4% from other races, and 2.4% from two or more races.

Of the 62 households, 14.5% had children under the age of 18 living with them, 43.5% were married couples living together, 3.2% had a female householder with no husband present, and 50.0% were non-families. 43.5% of all households were made up of individuals, and 14.5% had someone living alone who was 65 years of age or older. The average household size was 2.00 and the average family size was 2.74.

In the CDP, the age distribution of the population shows 20.2% under the age of 18, 1.6% from 18 to 24, 21.8% from 25 to 44, 41.9% from 45 to 64, and 14.5% who were 65 years of age or older. The median age was 46 years. For every 100 females, there were 129.6 males. For every 100 females age 18 and over, there were 147.5 males.

The median income for a household in the CDP was $19,583, and the median income for a family was $57,917. Males had a median income of $46,250 versus $31,250 for females. The per capita income for the CDP was $20,018. There were 20.0% of families and 23.5% of the population living below the poverty line, including 62.5% of under eighteens and 14.3% of those over 64.

== Facilities, utilities, schools and health care ==
=== Facilities and utilities ===
Individual wells are the primary source of water in Slana; others draw water from Rufus Creek. The schools operate individual wells. Outhouses, honeybuckets and septic systems are used for sewage disposal. Approximately one third of the homes have complete plumbing. A feasibility study has been funded to examine system alternatives. Funds have been requested for a watering point at the new Community Center/Clinic. The landfill was closed in 1990. Electricity was added in the summer of 2006 by Alaska Power and Telephone.

=== Schools ===
There is one school in the community, Slana School, a part of the Copper River School District. It is attended by 14 students.

=== Health care ===
Local hospitals or health clinics include Tok Community Clinic (907-883-5855) in Tok or Gulkana Clinic (907-822-3646). A clinic is under construction. Slana is classified as an isolated village, it is found in EMS Region 2E in the Copper River Region. Emergency Services have highway, air and river access. Emergency service is provided by 911 Telephone Service and volunteers Auxiliary health care is provided by Copper River EMS (907-822-3671); Chistochina/Slana First Responders (907-822-3671); Tok Clinic or Gulkana Clinic.

== Economy and transportation ==
=== Economy ===
A roadside lodge provides groceries, gas, liquor, an auto mechanic and RV parking. Other local businesses include a general store, art gallery, canoe rental, bed and breakfast, snowmachine sales and solar panel sales. A Park Ranger Station and state highway maintenance camp are located nearby. Subsistence activities supplement income.

=== Transportation ===
Slana has road access to the statewide system by the Glenn and Richardson Highways. Individual adjacent lots have no roads and owners must hike through other's private property. The nearest public airstrip is south, at Chistochina. A 900' gravel private airstrip has been constructed at Duffy's Tavern.

== Parks ==
The Nabesna Road provides access to the interior of the Wrangell–St. Elias National Park and Preserve, a World Heritage Site. Nearby to Slana is the Porcupine Creek State Recreation Site, a 240 acres (97 ha) park with camping and fishing in a dense forest area.
