= Gakona, Alaska =

Gakona Ggax Kuna’
- CDP
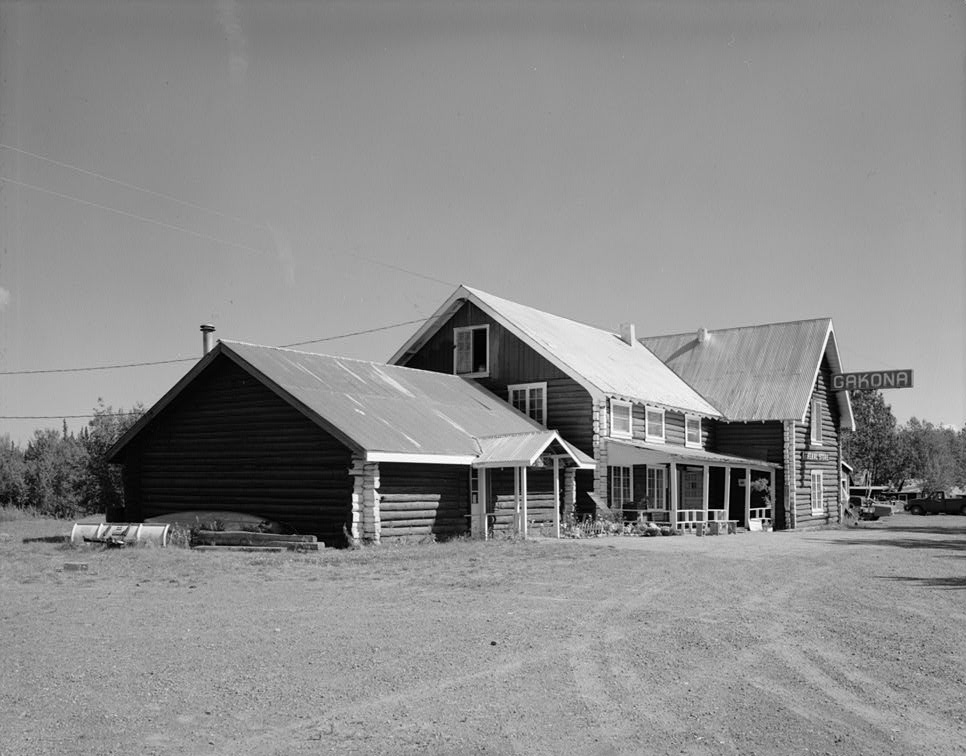
- Side view of the Gakona Roadhouse, a major community building

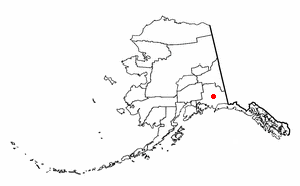
- Location of Gakona, Alaska

- Location within Alaska Location within North America
- Coordinates: 62°18′17″N 145°16′24″W
- Country: United States
- State: Alaska
- Census Area: Copper River

Government
  - State senator: Click Bishop (R)
  - State rep.: Mike Cronk (R)

Area
  - Total: 60.64 sq mi (157.06 km^{2})
  - Land: 60.63 sq mi (157.03 km^{2})
  - Water: 0.012 sq mi (0.03 km^{2})

Population (2020)
  - Total: 169
  - Density: 2.8/sq mi (1.08/km^{2})
- Time zone: UTC-9 (Alaska (AKST))
  - Summer (DST): UTC-8 (AKDT)
- ZIP code: 99586
- Area code: 907
- FIPS code: 02-27420

Gakona /ɡəˈkoʊnə/ (Ggax Kuna’ in Ahtna Athabascan) is a census-designated place (CDP) in the Copper River Census Area in the U.S. state of Alaska. As of the 2020 census, the population of the CDP was 169, down from 218 in 2010. It is home to the High-frequency Active Auroral Research Program.

== Geography and climate ==
Gakona is located at 62°18′17″N 145°16′24″W (62.301940, -145.30194) (Sec. 18, T006N, R001E, Copper River Meridian). It is positioned in the Chitina Recording District in the center of Copper Valley, surrounded by mountains and the Copper River.

Gakona is at the confluence of the Copper and Gakona rivers, 15 miles (24 km) northeast of Glennallen. It lies at mile 2 on the Tok Cut-Off to the Glenn Highway, just east of the Richardson Highway. Gakona is located in the continental climate zone, with long, cold winters and relatively warm summers. Temperature extremes have been recorded from −62 to 91 °F (−52 to 33 °C). Snowfall averages 61 inches (150 cm), with total precipitation of 13 inches (330 mm) per year.

According to the United States Census Bureau, the CDP has a total area of 61.3 square miles (159 km^{2}), all of it land.

== History and culture ==
Ahtna Athabascans have lived in the Copper River basin for 5,000 to 7,000 years. Gakona served as a wood and fish camp, and later became a permanent village. A federally recognized tribe, the Native Village of Gakona, is located in the community.

In 1904 Doyle's Roadhouse was constructed at the junction of the Valdez-Eagle and Valdez-Fairbanks Trails, and became an essential stopping point for travelers. There was also a post office, stagecoach station and blacksmith shop here. Some buildings are still standing. Gakona Lodge was built in 1929 by Arne N Sundt and was operated by Henra Sundt until 1976 when she sold it to the Strang family. Originally from Norway, Sundt purchased the old roadhouse and property from the Slate Creek Mining Company in about 1926. Sundt was a director of the Nabesna Mining Company. The lodge is on the National Register of Historical Places. It contains 10 rooms in the lodge, 4 cabins, and restaurant and tavern. It is presently a popular destination for sports fishing, particularly king and sockeye salmon.

== Demographics ==
Historical population
Census	Pop.	Note	%±
1940	46		—
1950	50		8.7%
1960	33		−34.0%
1970	88		166.7%
1980	87		−1.1%
1990	25		−71.3%
2000	215		760.0%
2010	218		1.4%
2020	169		−22.5%
U.S. Decennial Census

Gakona first appeared on the 1940 U.S. Census as an unincorporated village. It was made a census-designated place (CDP) in 1980.

As of the census of 2000, there were 215 people, 84 households, and 60 families residing in the CDP. The population density was 3.5 inhabitants per square mile (1.4/km^{2}). There were 90 housing units at an average density of 1.5 units per square mile (0.58 units/km^{2}). The racial makeup of the CDP was 75.35% White, 12.09% Native American, 1.86% from other races, and 10.70% from two or more races. 1.40% of the population were Hispanic or Latino of any race.

Of the 84 households, 35.7% had children under the age of 18 living with them, 61.9% were married couples living together, 3.6% had a female householder with no husband present, and 27.4% were non-families. 22.6% of all households were made up of individuals, and 3.6% had someone living alone who was 65 years of age or older. The average household size was 2.56 and the average family size was 3.02.

In the CDP, the population was spread out, with 28.8% under the age of 18, 3.7% from 18 to 24, 27.4% from 25 to 44, 31.6% from 45 to 64, and 8.4% who were 65 years of age or older. The median age was 41 years. For every 100 females, there were 133.7 males. For every 100 females age 18 and over, there were 131.8 males.

The median income for a household in the CDP was $33,750, and the median income for a family was $44,375. Males had a median income of $41,250 versus $46,875 for females. The per capita income for the CDP was $18,143. About 9.4% of families and 10.8% of the population were below the poverty line, including 3.4% of those under the age of eighteen and 10.5% of those 65 or over.

== Public services ==
Groceries, limited hardware, local clothing, limited sporting goods, and ice are available at the trading post. Salmon fishing and river rafting are popular recreational activities.

All residences have individual wells and septic systems and complete plumbing. The school uses its own well water system. Funds have been requested to construct a new water well and storage tank for a HUD housing complex. Refuse collection services are available from Copper Basin Sanitation, which hauls waste to the Glennallen landfill. Electricity is provided by Copper Valley Electric Assoc. Local hospitals or health clinics include Gakona Health Clinic and the Cross Road Medical Center in Glennallen (about 30 miles away). Gakona is classified as an isolated village; it is found in EMS Region 2E in the Copper River Region. Emergency Services have highway and air access, and are within 30 minutes of a higher-level satellite health care facility. Emergency service is provided by 911 Telephone Service and volunteers, while auxiliary health care is provided by Delta Medical Transport, Gulkana Clinic, and the Cross Road Medical Center in Glennallen.

Copper River School District previously operated the Gakona Elementary School. Since 2003, it was attended by 15-17 students, until it was closed in 2008. The school still wasn't open in the 2017/2018 school year.

== Economy and transportation ==
Gakona depends upon local businesses and seasonal tourist travel. There is a Historic Lodge (National Register of Historic Places) called Gakona Lodge and Trading Post that has rooms, a restaurant, cabins and tavern. Gakona sawmill and dog sled maker. Summers provide income for local fishing and hunting guides, rafting operations and outfitters. Three residents currently hold commercial fishing permits. Gakona is located adjacent to the Copper, Gakona and Gulkana Rivers allowing access to world class King Salmon, Sockeye Salmon and Rainbow Trout fishing. Some residents rely on subsistence activities and trapping. Recording equipment for the High Frequency Active Auroral Research Program (HAARP) is located near Gakona.

The Glenn Highway/Tok Cut-Off and Richardson Highway provide access to the Anchorage, Fairbanks and the Lower 48. A 5,000-foot (1,500 m) paved runway is available at nearby Gulkana.
