= Mount O'Neel =

Mountain in Alaska, United States

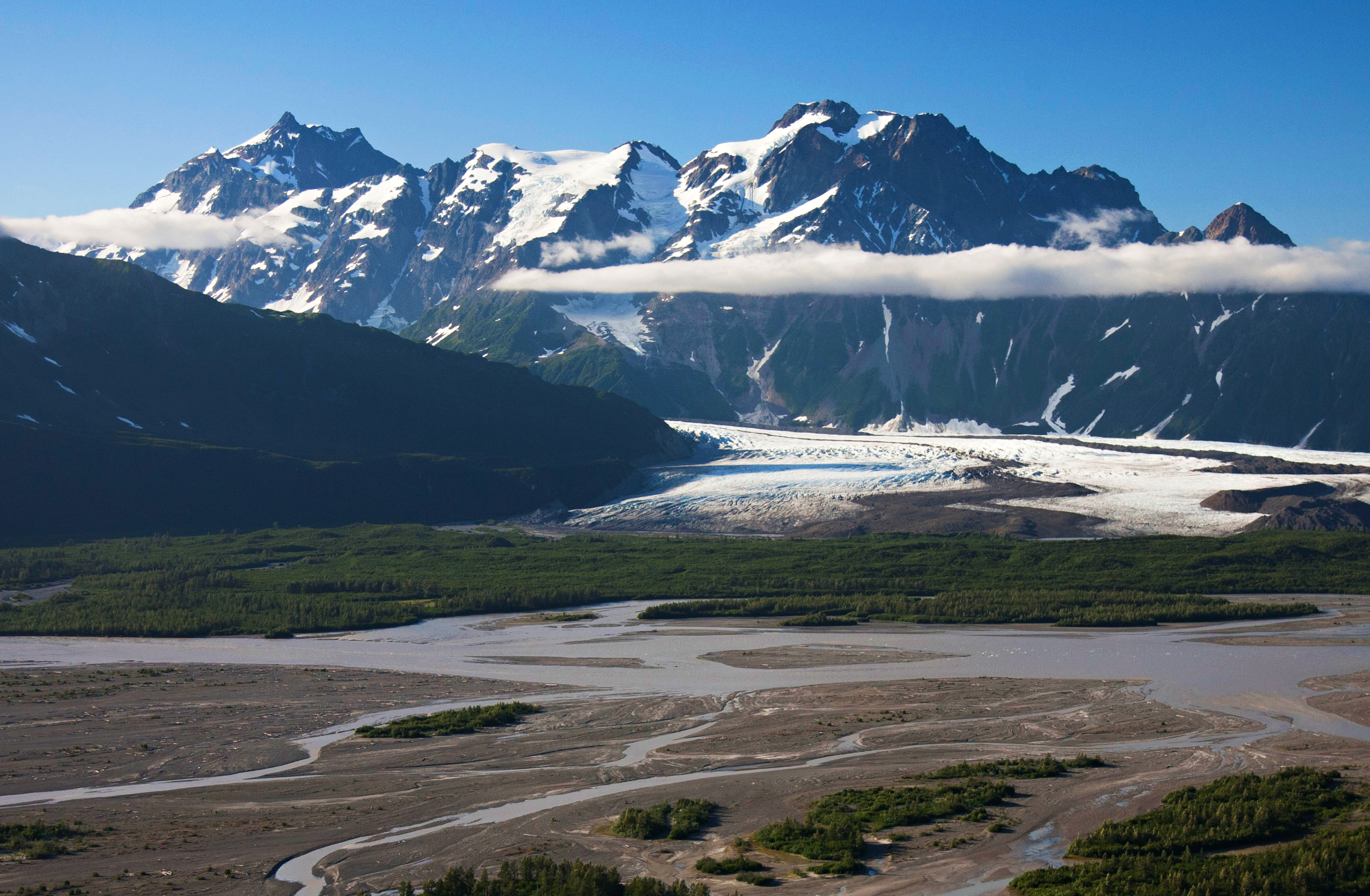
- Mount O'Neel, south aspect, seen with Mt. Williams (left), Childs Glacier, and Copper River

Highest point
- Elevation: 6,411 ft (1,954 m)
- Prominence: 1,161 ft (354 m)
- Parent peak: Mount Williams
- Isolation: 2.6 mi (4.2 km)
- Coordinates: 60°42′12″N 144°49′53″W

Geography
- Location within Alaska
- Interactive map of Mount O'Neel
- Location: Chugach Census Area
- Country: United States
- State: Alaska
- Protected area: Chugach National Forest
- Parent range: Chugach Mountains
- Topo map: USGS Cordova C-3

Mount O'Neel is a 6,411-foot (1,954 m) summit in the U.S. state of Alaska.

== Description ==
Mount O'Neel is located in the Chugach Mountains, 34 miles (55 km) east-northeast of Cordova and 2.5 mi (4 km) southeast of Mount Williams, on land managed by Chugach National Forest. Although modest in elevation, topographic relief is significant since the south face of the mountain rises up over 5,400 feet (1,646 m) in less than one mile from the immense Childs Glacier. The peak can be seen from the Copper River Highway.

The peak was named about 1910 by Lawrence Martin, for A. C. O'Neel, Chief Bridge Engineer for Copper River and Northwestern Railway, who built a $1,500,000 steel bridge across the Copper River near the southeast base of this mountain in 1909–1910. The mountain's toponym was officially adopted in 1930 by the U.S. Board on Geographic Names.

== Climate ==
Based on the Köppen climate classification, Mount O'Neel is located in a subpolar oceanic climate zone, with long, cold, snowy winters, and cool summers. Weather systems coming off the Gulf of Alaska are forced upwards by the Chugach Mountains (orographic lift), causing heavy rainfall. Winter temperatures can drop to 0 °F with wind chill factors below −10 °F. This climate supports the Childs Glacier to the south and Grinnell Glacier to the north. The months May through June offer the most favorable weather for viewing and climbing.

== Gallery ==
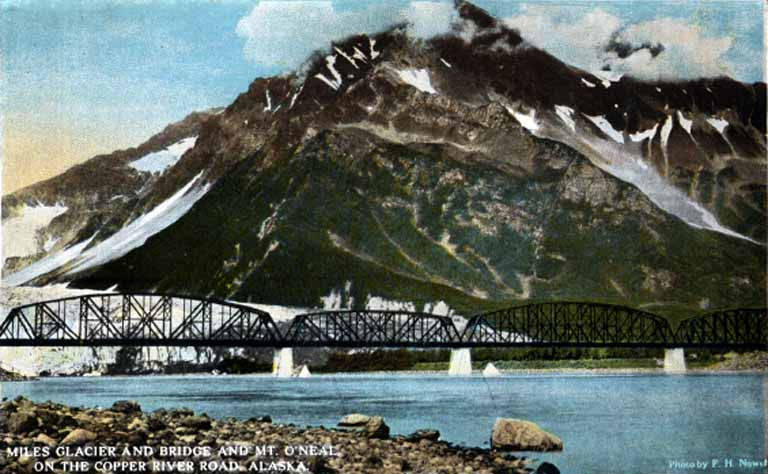
1913 postcard

== See also ==
- List of mountain peaks of Alaska
- Geography of Alaska
