= List of bridges documented by the Historic American Engineering Record in Alaska =

This is a list of bridges documented by the Historic American Engineering Record in the US state of Alaska.

== Bridges ==
Survey No.	Name (as assigned by HAER)	Status	Type	Built	Documented	Carries	Crosses	Location	Borough or Census Area	Coordinates
AK-4	Kuskalana Bridge	Extant	Pratt truss	1910	1982	AK-10 (McCarthy Road)	Kuskulana River	Chitina	Copper River Census Area	61°29′20″N 144°00′56″W
AK-10	Copper River and Northwest Railroad, Million Dollar Bridge	Extant	Pennsylvania truss	1909	1984	AK-10 (Copper River Highway)	Copper River	Cordova	Chugach Census Area	60°40′23″N 144°44′45″W
AK-14	Nizina Bridge	Abandoned	Parker truss	1925	1986	Nizina Road	Nizina River	McCarthy	Copper River Census Area	61°21′50″N 142°46′56″W
AK-15	Copper River and Northwestern Railroad, Gilahina Bridge	Abandoned	Trestle	1911	1985	Copper River and Northwestern Railway	Gilahina River	Chitina	Copper River Census Area	61°26′19″N 143°43′04″W
AK-27; AK-33	O'Connell Bridge; Japonski Bridge	Extant	Cable-stayed	1972	1991; 2001		Sitka Channel	Sitka	Sitka	57°02′52″N 135°20′26″W
AK-29	Old Bridge		Timber stringer		1995		Contact Creek branch	Anaktuvuk Pass	North Slope Borough	
AK-37	Taiya River Bridge	Extant	Parker truss		2000	Dyea Road	Taiya River	Skagway	Skagway	59°30′44″N 135°20′50″W
AK-39	White Pass and Yukon Railroad, Cantilever Bridge	Extant	Cantilever		2000	White Pass and Yukon Route		Skagway	Skagway	59°33′10″N 135°07′16″W
AK-66	Alaska Railroad, Bridge No. 354.4	Replaced	Pratt truss	1922	2004	Alaska Railroad	Nenana River tributary	Healy	Denali Borough	63°48′34″N 148°56′59″W
AK-67	Alaska Railroad, Trestle MP 187.6	Replaced	Trestle	1917	2002	Alaska Railroad	Iron Creek	Willow	Matanuska-Susitna Borough	61°45′46″N 150°02′53″W
AK-68	Alaska Railroad, Trestle MP 200.9	Replaced	Trestle	1917	2002	Alaska Railroad	Caswell Creek	Willow	Matanuska-Susitna Borough	61°57′38″N 150°02′41″W
AK-69	Alaska Railroad, Trestle MP 233.4	Replaced	Trestle	1919	2002	Alaska Railroad	Susitna River tributary	Talkeetna	Matanuska-Susitna Borough	62°25′00″N 150°07′12″W
AK-70	Alaska Railroad, Trestle MP 233.6	Replaced	Trestle	1919	2002	Alaska Railroad	Susitna River tributary	Talkeetna	Matanuska-Susitna Borough	62°25′10″N 150°07′19″W
AK-71	Alaska Railroad, Trestle MP 267.7	Replaced	Trestle	1920	2002	Alaska Railroad	Valentine Creek	Talkeetna	Matanuska-Susitna Borough	62°48′32″N 149°39′18″W
AK-72	Alaska Railroad, Bridge at MP 305.7	Replaced	Steel rolled multi-beam	1951	2003	Alaska Railroad	Chulitna River middle fork	Broad Pass	Matanuska-Susitna Borough	63°15′08″N 149°14′51″W
