= Goat Mountain (Cordova) =

Mountain in Alaska, United States

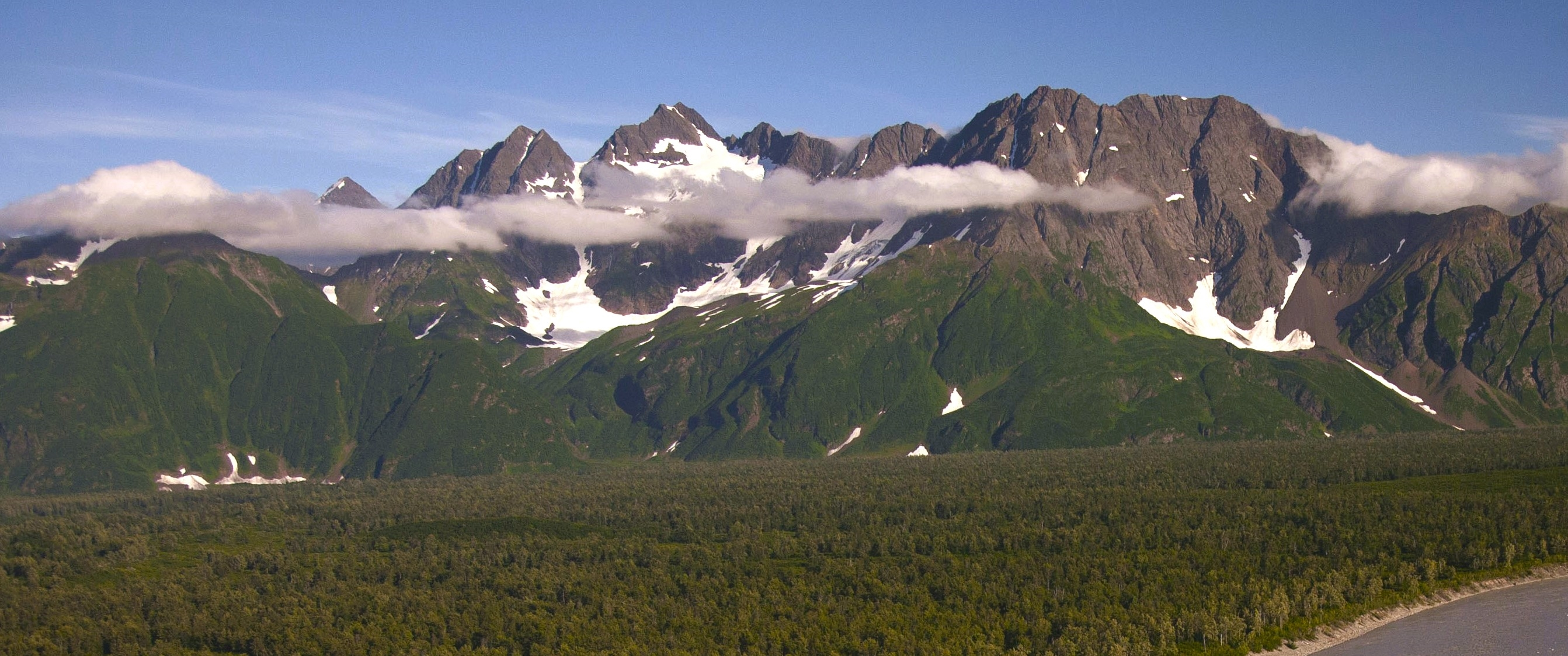
- Northwest aspect

Highest point
- Elevation: 4,370 ft (1,332 m)
- Prominence: 820 ft (250 m)
- Parent peak: Peak 4603
- Isolation: 1.53 mi (2.46 km)
- Coordinates: 60°36′26″N 144°38′46″W

Geography
- Location within Alaska
- Interactive map of Goat Mountain
- Location: Chugach Census Area
- Country: United States
- State: Alaska
- Protected area: Chugach National Forest
- Parent range: Chugach Mountains
- Topo map: USGS Cordova C-2

Goat Mountain is a 4,370-foot (1,332 m) summit in the U.S. state of Alaska.

== Description ==
Goat Mountain is located in the Chugach Mountains, 38 miles (61 km) east-northeast of Cordova on land managed by Chugach National Forest. Although modest in elevation, topographic relief is significant as the summit rises 4,300 feet (1,310 m) above Miles Lake in less than three miles (4.8 km). The mountain can be seen from the Copper River Highway at the Miles Glacier Bridge. The mountain was named in 1910 by a survey crew working on the Copper River and Northwestern Railway, and the toponym has been officially adopted by the U.S. Board on Geographic Names.

== Climate ==
Based on the Köppen climate classification, Goat Mountain is located in a subpolar oceanic climate zone, with long, cold, snowy winters, and cool summers. Weather systems coming off the Gulf of Alaska are forced upwards by the Chugach Mountains (orographic lift), causing heavy rainfall. Winter temperatures can drop to 0 °F with wind chill factors below −10 °F. This climate supports the Childs Glacier to the northwest, Miles Glacier to the northeast, and McPherson Glacier to the southeast. The months May through June offer the most favorable weather for viewing and climbing.

== Gallery ==
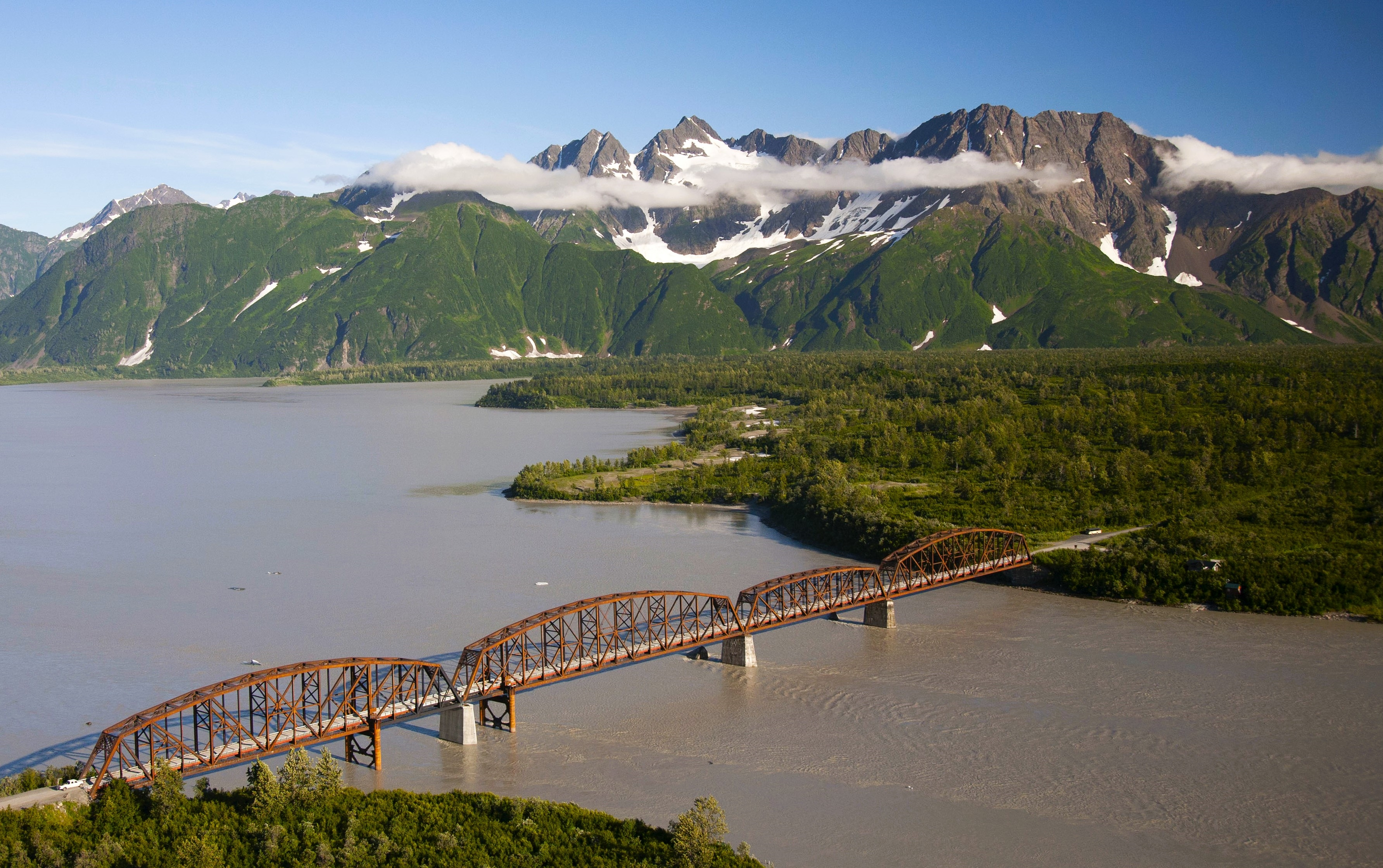
Aerial view of Goat Mountain, Miles Lake (left), Miles Glacier Bridge, and Copper River (right)

== See also ==
- List of mountain peaks of Alaska
- Geography of Alaska
