= Sitka Seaplane Base =

Seaplane base in Alaska

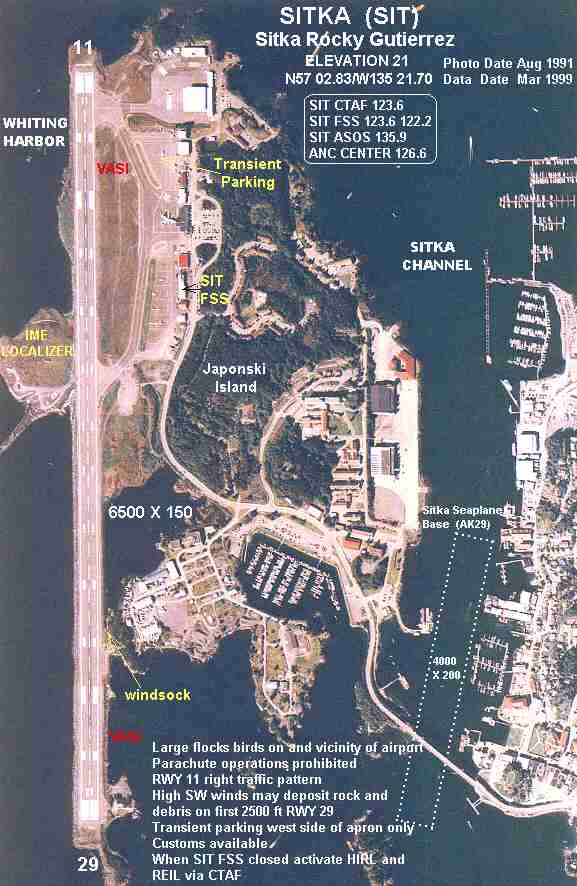
- IATA: none; ICAO: none; FAA LID: A29

Summary
- Airport type: Public
- Owner: City & Borough of Sitka
- Serves: Sitka, Alaska
- Elevation AMSL: 0 ft / 0 m
- Coordinates: 57°03′08″N 135°20′46″W

Map
- Location of airport in Alaska

Runways
| Direction | Length | | Surface |
| Direction | ft | m | Surface |
|---|---|---|---|
| NW/SE | 4,000 | 1,219 | Water |

Statistics (2006)
- Aircraft operations: 4,750
- Based aircraft: 9
- Source: Federal Aviation Administration

Sitka Seaplane Base (FAA LID: A29) is a public use seaplane base owned by and located in Sitka, a city and borough in the U.S. state of Alaska. It is included in the National Plan of Integrated Airport Systems for 2011–2015, which categorized it as a general aviation facility. This seaplane base is located near the Sitka Rocky Gutierrez Airport.

As per Federal Aviation Administration records, the airport had 32 passenger boardings (enplanements) in calendar year 2008, 22 enplanements in 2009, and 41 in 2010.

== Facilities and aircraft ==
Sitka Seaplane Base has one seaplane landing area designated NW/SE with a water surface measuring 4,000 by 200 feet (1,219 x 61 m). It is located on the Sitka Channel, between Japonski Island and Baranof Island.

For the 12-month period ending December 31, 2006, the airport had 4,750 aircraft operations, an average of 13 per day: 84% air taxi and 16% general aviation. At that time there were 9 aircraft based at this airport, all single-engine.

== Airlines and destinations ==
The following airline service is subsidized by the United States Department of Transportation via the Essential Air Service program.

| Airlines | Destinations |
|---|---|
| Baranautica Air Service | Port Alexander |

== See also ==
- List of airports in Alaska
- Sitka Rocky Gutierrez Airport at coordinates 57°02′50″N 135°21′42″W
