= Mt. Edgecumbe High School =

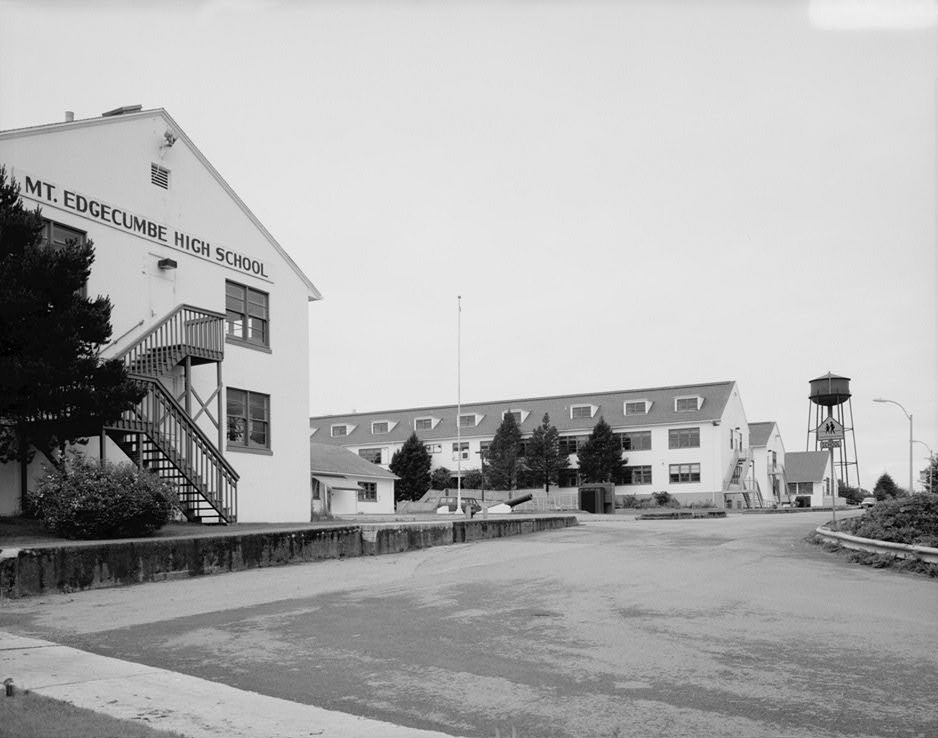
- 1991 photo of buildings of the former Sitka Naval Operating Base, as then used by MEHS for classrooms and dormitories.

Location
- 1330 Seward Avenue; Sitka, Alaska 99835; United States; 57°03′11″N 135°21′13″W

Information
- Type: Public secondary
- Established: 1947 (79 years ago)
- NCES District ID: 0200006
- Superintendent: Suzzuk Mary Huntington
- CEEB code: 020085
- NCES School ID: 020000600558
- Staff: 28.00 (on an FTE basis)
- Teaching staff: 24.90 (on an FTE basis)
- Grades: 9–12
- Enrollment: 422 (2024–2025)
- Student to teacher ratio: 16.95
- Colors: Cardinal and gold
- Athletics conference: Alaska Region V
- Mascot: Brave and Lady Brave
- Website: www.mehs.us

Mt. Edgecumbe High School (abbreviated MEHS) is a public boarding high school in Sitka, Alaska in the United States. Located on Japonski Island, across Sitka Harbor from the northwestern corner of downtown Sitka, the school was established in 1947 on a portion of Sitka's former World War II-era military installations. The enrollment was 311 students as of February 2026.

The school is named for Mount Edgecumbe, which is located on Kruzof Island. It is a 3,077 feet (938 m) high, historically active volcano that is visible from the campus. The mountain was named by British Captain James Cook in 1778 for George, Earl of Edgecumbe.

== Governance ==
The Alaska State Board of Education serves as the school board for Mt. Edgecumbe High School.

For administrative and statistical purposes, MEHS is considered by the state to be a school district, albeit one consisting of only one school. The student body, both in its former and current incarnations, is predominately from rural Alaska.

== History ==
In 1947, the federal government established Mt. Edgecumbe High School to provide higher education to rural Alaska Native students and to use the World War II-era military installations on Japonski Island in Sitka. This was no longer needed by the military. The school was originally administered by the Bureau of Indian Affairs as part of a network of boarding high schools for Alaska Natives. These included schools in Eklutna and Wrangell.

For a time, until the resolution of the Tobeluk v. Lind lawsuit and the subsequent construction of K–12 schools in most rural communities, MEHS was one of the few viable options that many rural students had to obtain a high school education. The BIA schools in rural villages provided schooling only until the eighth grade.

After several decades of operation by the BIA, the school was briefly closed in the 1980s. It was reopened by the Alaska Department of Education, which operates it today.

Today, the school still attracts rural residents, primarily students from communities too small to qualify for state school funding. It also attracts athletes who seek to develop their skills beyond the competition within their local school districts.

== Curriculum ==
Mt. Edgecumbe is known for developing educationally disadvantaged students from rural Alaska. Ninety percent of its students attend universities and college after graduation. All students are required to learn a non-indigenous second language; most choose Chinese or Japanese. Students are also required to familiarize themselves with an array of technologies and to participate in the academic environment; for example, classes are held on Saturdays once a month.

Each member of the MEHS faculty is in charge of a kind of "extended family" scheme, in which teachers develop closer connections with small groups of students. The faculty members eat dinner with their students at the school cafeteria every Thursday to help build personal connections with students and strengthen the community at the school.

MEHS is known for its science program. It includes a high-level SeaTech program that partners with the Whale Acoustics Lab at Scripps Institution of Oceanography and NOAA to research marine mammal acoustics.

== Sport and extracurricular activities ==
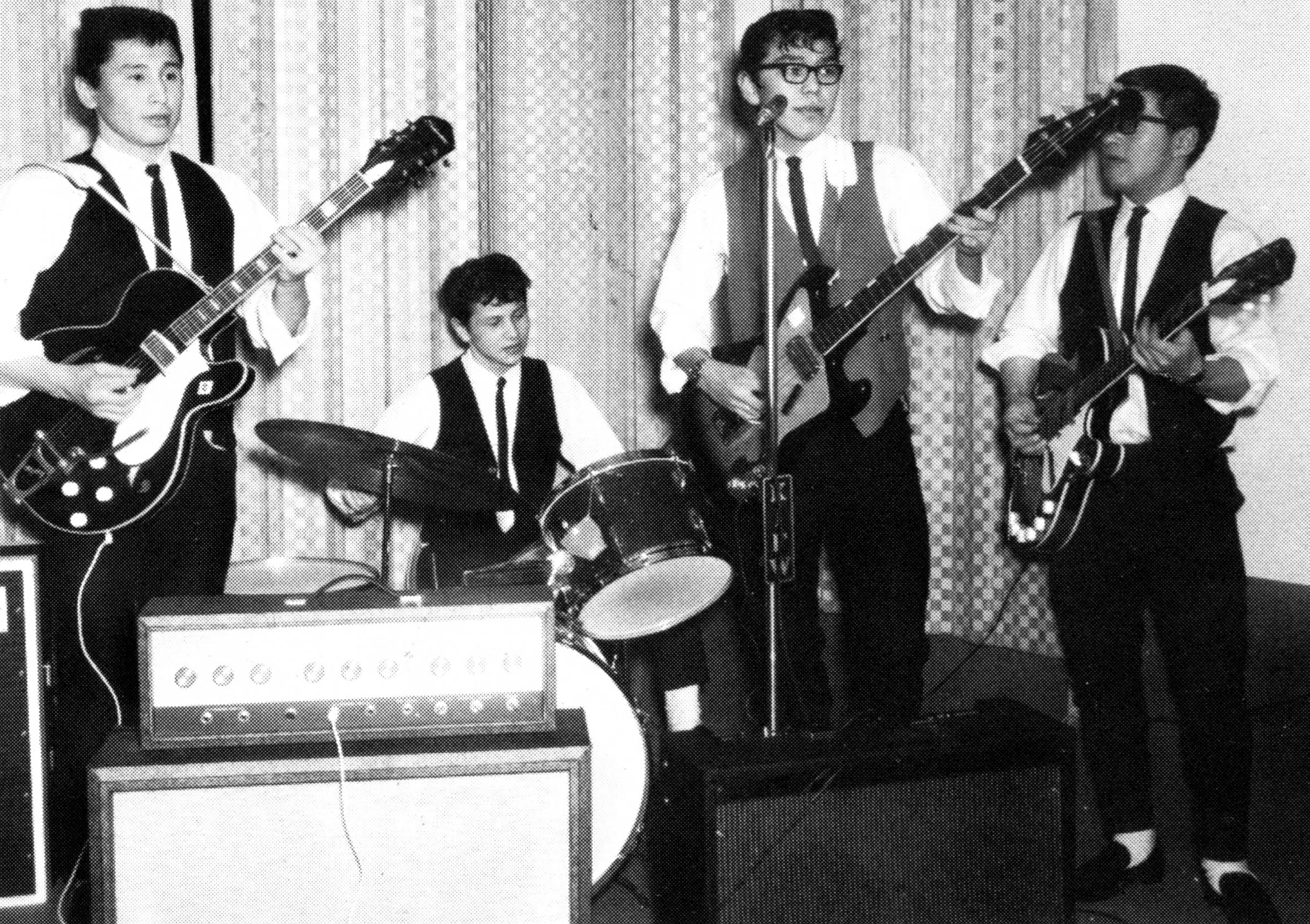
A student band during the 1966–1967 school year, calling themselves "The Misteaks", performs on a local television program.

Mt. Edgecumbe's sports teams are known as the Braves, for male athletes, and the Lady Braves for female athletes.

MEHS is classified as a 3A school by the Alaska School Activities Association.

The school's traditional rivals include its cross-town 3A rival Sitka High School (their matchups are known as the "Battle of the Bridge", alluding to the respective schools' locations on different sides of the John O'Connell Bridge). In the school's earliest years, they also had a cross-town rivalry with Sheldon Jackson High School, a sectarian boarding school that developed as Sheldon Jackson College. (It has since closed.)

=== Athletics ===
Historically, Edgecumbe was known for its running teams. In the 1960s and early 1970s MEHS won 11 consecutive regional championships in cross-country. They last made it to a regional championship in 2008.

=== Basketball ===
The school has made repeated runs to state championships with its basketball teams. The Lady Braves program has done exceptionally well in regional play; since 1993-1994 the Lady Braves have made fourteen appearances at the state tournament. In the 2008–2009 season, the Lady Braves made the school's first appearance at a state basketball championship game, playing Anchorage Christian Schools (ACS), eventually losing 32–28. In 2010, the Lady Braves captured the school's first state basketball championship after defeating ACS 32–26. In 2014, the Lady Braves made a repeat appearance at the state championship, eventually losing to ACS.

=== Volleyball ===
Since 2005, the Lady Braves volleyball team have finished as the Class 3A State runner-up three times, and won state championships in 2011, 2012, 2014, and 2016.

In 2011 and 2014, the Lady Braves volleyball team advanced to state and took first place.

=== Other activities ===
The school's drama, debate and forensic teams has been successful at the state level, winning a state championship in drama in 2004. The school has produced many quality wrestling teams as well.

== Campus ==
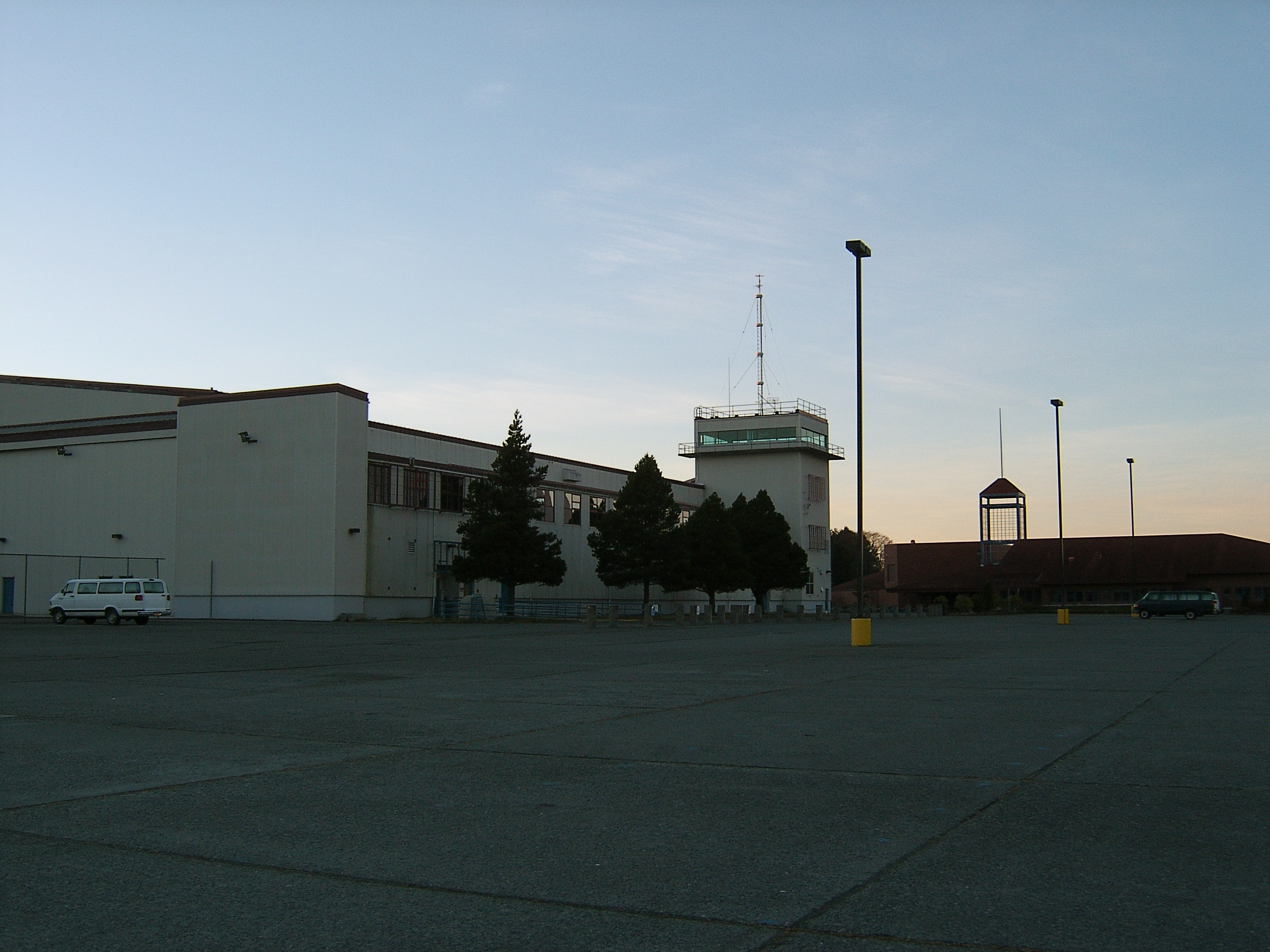
The B.J. McGillis Field House, a former aircraft hangar, along with the Academic Building, looking northerly from the parking lot

The main school building consists of the former Sitka Naval Operating Base.

Sports are played at the B.J. McGillis Field House, a former World War II-era aircraft hangar. Since this is one of the larger sports venues in Southeast Alaska, rivalry games and regional championships often attract crowds exceeding 1,500 spectators.

The facility has standard bleachers, reserved seating, a press box, a climbing wall, wrestling mats, and a weight training center. It is the only school in the region with a gymnasium large enough to hold two basketball courts.

Outside of the school year, the campus has hosted summer camps such as the Sitka Fine Arts Camp. This has relocated to the campus of the former Sheldon Jackson College, which has closed. In 2018 it hosted a portion of the inaugural Outer Coast College Summer Seminar.

== Enrollment and demographics ==
Mt. Edgecumbe expanded from 370 to 400 students in 2004. The Alaska Department of Education & Early Development reported that the school had an enrollment of 421 students on October 1, 2014: 109 freshmen, 110 sophomores, 106 juniors and 96 seniors. The school normally has 140 openings, while 300 students usually apply every year. In 2005, more than 100 communities throughout Alaska were represented among MEHS's student body.

Ninety percent of MEHS's student body is Alaska Native, with the majority hailing from rural Alaska. The school makes some efforts to promote the cultural identity of Alaska Natives both locally and abroad. There are several student-led Alaska Native dance groups; the Yup'ik dance group performed at dance and culture festivals in Europe in 2012.

== Sister school ==
Mt. Edgecumbe High School has a sister school relationship with Muroran Shimizugaoka High School (北海道室蘭清水丘高等学校) on the Japanese island of Hokkaido.

== See also ==
- List of high schools in Alaska
- List of school districts in Alaska
- Native American boarding schools
