= Mount Williams (Alaska) =

Mountain in Alaska, United States

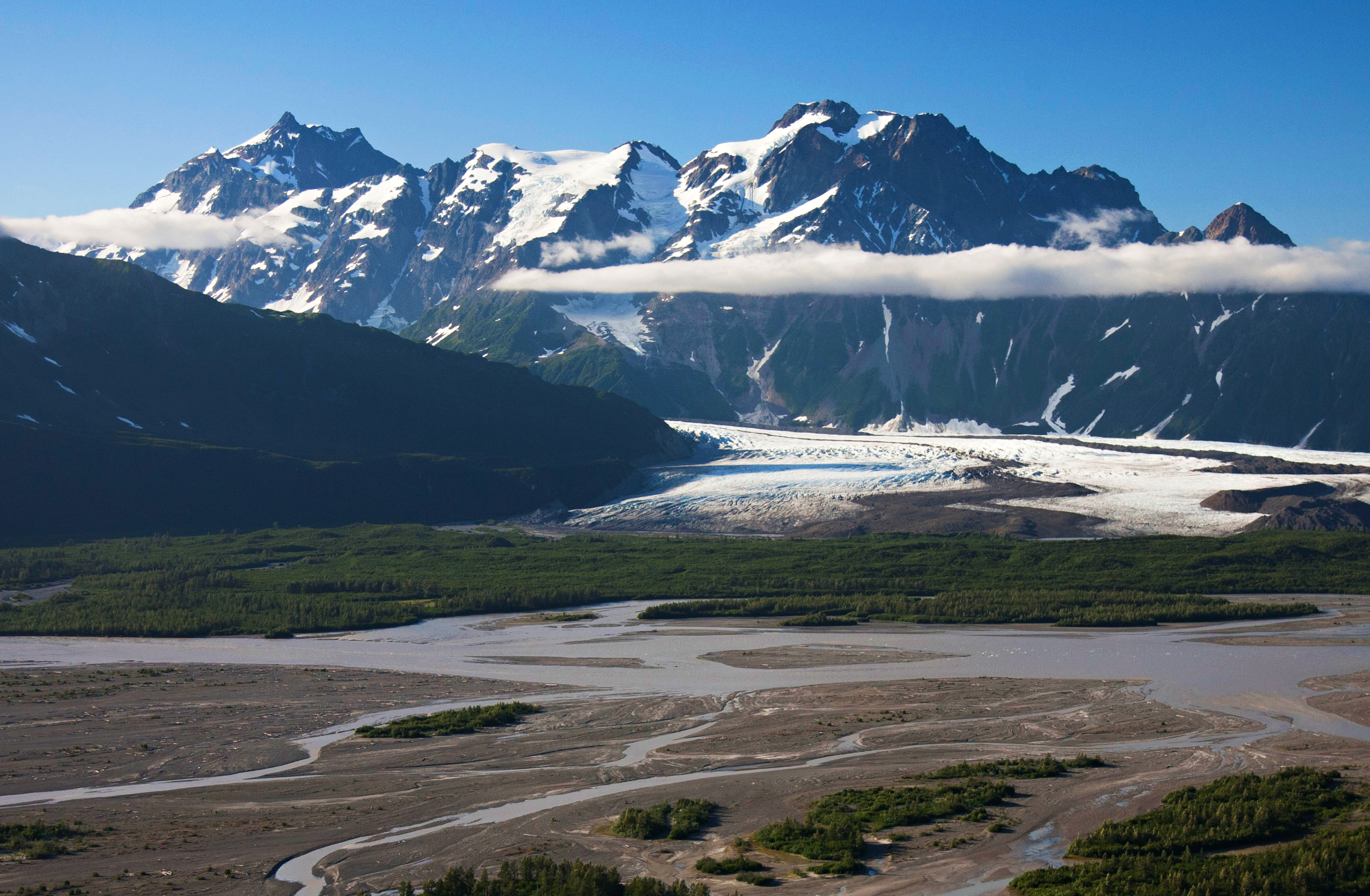
- Mount Williams (left), seen with Mt. O'Neel, Childs Glacier, and Copper River

Highest point
- Elevation: 7,200+ ft (2,190+ m)
- Prominence: 3,200 ft (980 m)
- Isolation: 9.98 mi (16.06 km)
- Coordinates: 60°43′23″N 144°53′48″W

Geography
- Location within Alaska
- Location: Chugach National Forest; Chugach Census Area; Alaska, United States
- Parent range: Chugach Mountains
- Topo map: USGS Cordova C-3

Mount Williams is a 7,200+ ft (2,190+ m) glaciated mountain summit located in the Chugach Mountains in the U.S. state of Alaska. The peak is situated 30 mi (48 km) northeast of Cordova, and 2.5 mi (4 km) northwest of Mount O'Neel, on land managed by Chugach National Forest. Although modest in elevation, relief is significant as it rises over 5,000 feet (1,500 m) in less than one mile from the immense Childs Glacier.

The peak was named in 1910 by Lawrence Martin for Alfred Williams, assistant engineer for the Copper River and Northwestern Railway, which built a $1,500,000 steel bridge across the Copper River near this mountain in 1909-1910. The mountain's name was officially adopted in 1930 by the U.S. Board on Geographic Names.

== Climate ==
Based on the Köppen climate classification, Mount Williams is located in a subpolar oceanic climate zone, with long, cold, snowy winters, and cool summers. Winds coming off the Gulf of Alaska are forced upwards by the Chugach Mountains (orographic lift), causing heavy precipitation in the form of rainfall and snowfall. Temperatures can drop below −20 °C with wind chill factors below −30 °C. This climate supports the Childs Glacier to the south, and Allen Glacier to the north. The months May through June offer the most favorable weather for viewing and climbing.

== See also ==
- List of mountain peaks of Alaska
- Geography of Alaska
