= Miles Lake =

Lake in the U.S. state of Alaska

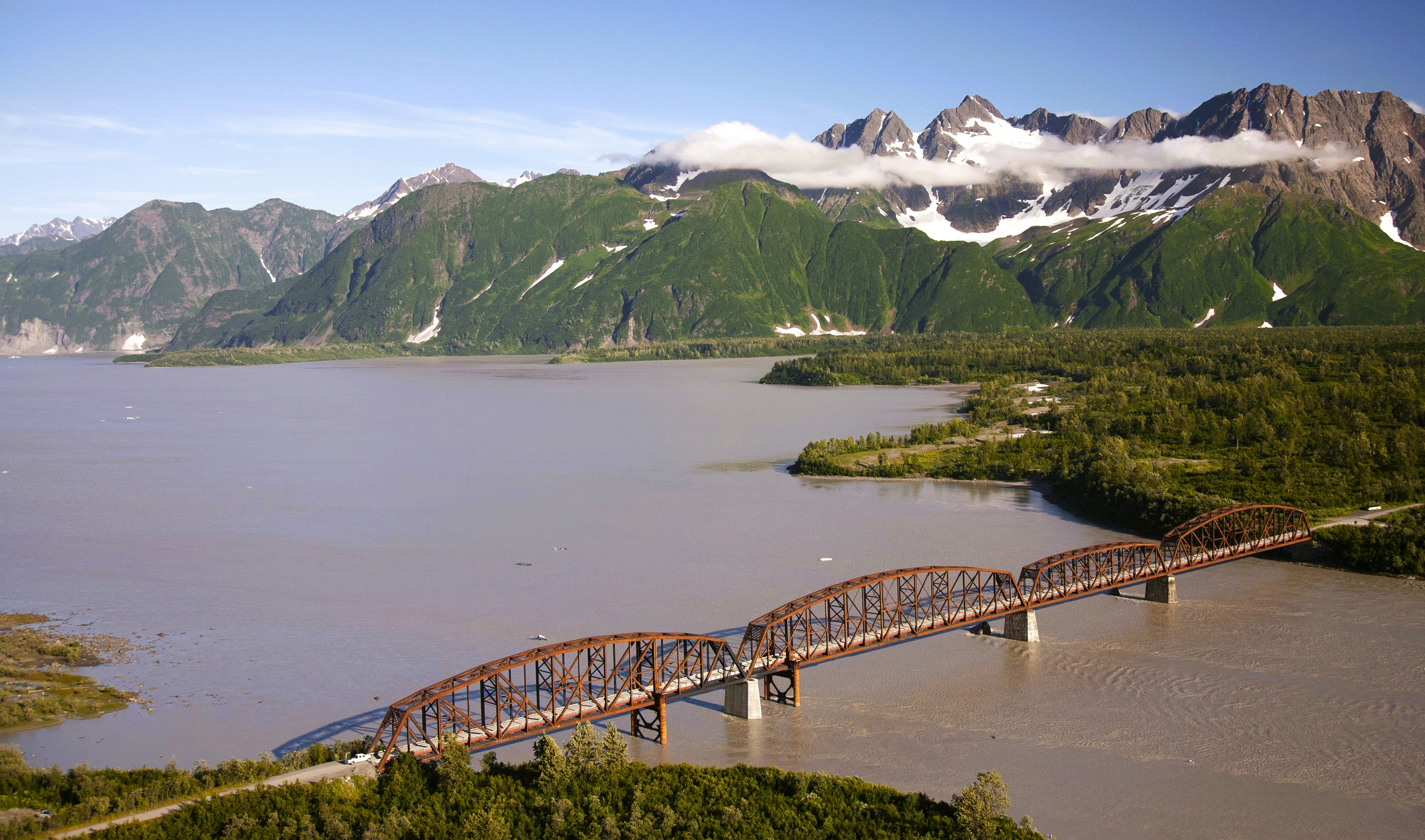
- Aerial view of Miles Lake (left), Miles Glacier Bridge, Copper River (right), and Goat Mountain.

- Location within Alaska Location within North America
- Location: Valdez-Cordova Census Area, Alaska, United States
- Coordinates: 60°40′53″N 144°40′3″W
- Primary inflows: Miles Glacier, Copper River
- Primary outflows: Copper River
- Basin countries: United States
- Max. length: 3.5 mi (5.6 km)
- Surface elevation: 125 feet (38 m)

Miles Lake is a 3.5 miles (5.6 km) long glacial lake in the U.S. state of Alaska. It is located in the valley of the Copper River, which pools to create it. The lake includes the terminus of Miles Glacier, 33 miles (53 km) north of Katalla, Chugach Mountains, and flows into the lower Copper River (Alaska).

== Etymology ==
Name derived from Miles Glacier, which was named in 1885 by Lt. Allen after Maj. Gen. Nelson A. Miles, 1839–1925.

== See also ==
- List of lakes of Alaska
