= Mount Hawkins (Alaska) =

Mountain in Alaska, United States

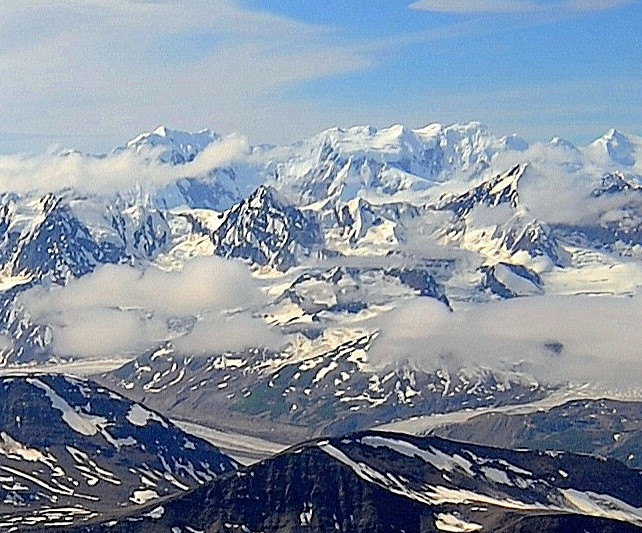
- North aspect of Mount Hawkins on skyline

Highest point
- Elevation: 9,318 ft (2,840 m)
- Prominence: 745 ft (227 m)
- Parent peak: Mount Tom White
- Isolation: 2.69 mi (4.33 km)
- Coordinates: 60°40′57″N 143°27′50″W

Naming
- Etymology: Erastus Corning Hawkins

Geography
- Location within Alaska
- Interactive map of Mount Hawkins
- Country: United States
- State: Alaska
- Census Area: Chugach
- Protected area: Wrangell–St. Elias National Park and Preserve
- Parent range: Chugach Mountains
- Topo map: USGS Bering Glacier C-7

Climbing
- First ascent: April 2000

Mount Hawkins is a 9,318-foot (2,840-metre) mountain summit in Alaska, United States.

== Description ==
Mount Hawkins is situated seven miles (11 km) east-northeast of Mount Tom White and 80 miles (129 km) east of Cordova in the Chugach Mountains and Wrangell–St. Elias National Park and Preserve. Topographic relief is significant as the summit rises 3,000 ft (910 m) above the surrounding glaciers in one mile (1.6 km). The mountain's toponym was applied in 1930 by Lawrence Martin of the U.S. Geological Survey to honor Erastus Corning Hawkins (1860–1912), the chief engineer who built the Copper River and Northwestern Railway. The toponym was officially adopted in 1930 by the U.S. Board on Geographic Names. The first ascent of the remote summit was made on April 13, 2000, by Paul Claus, Jay Claus, and Ruedi Hornberger.

== Climate ==
Based on the Köppen climate classification, Mount Hawkins is located in a tundra climate zone with cold, snowy winters, and cool summers. Weather systems coming off the Gulf of Alaska are forced upwards by the Chugach Mountains (orographic lift), causing heavy precipitation in the form of rainfall and snowfall. Winter temperatures can drop below 0 °F with wind chill factors below −20 °F. This climate supports massive glaciers and icefields surrounding this peak. The months May through June offer the most favorable weather for viewing or climbing Mount Hawkins.

== See also ==
- List of mountain peaks of Alaska
- Geography of Alaska

== Notes ==
Published elevations for Mount Hawkins vary. The first elevation published by the U.S. Board on Geographic Names in 1930 estimated it at 10,000 feet. The USGS places the toponym at the 9,318-ft east peak. Some websites for mountain climbers list the elevation as 10,295 feet, and 10,247 feet.
