= Mount Tom White =

Mountain in Alaska, United States

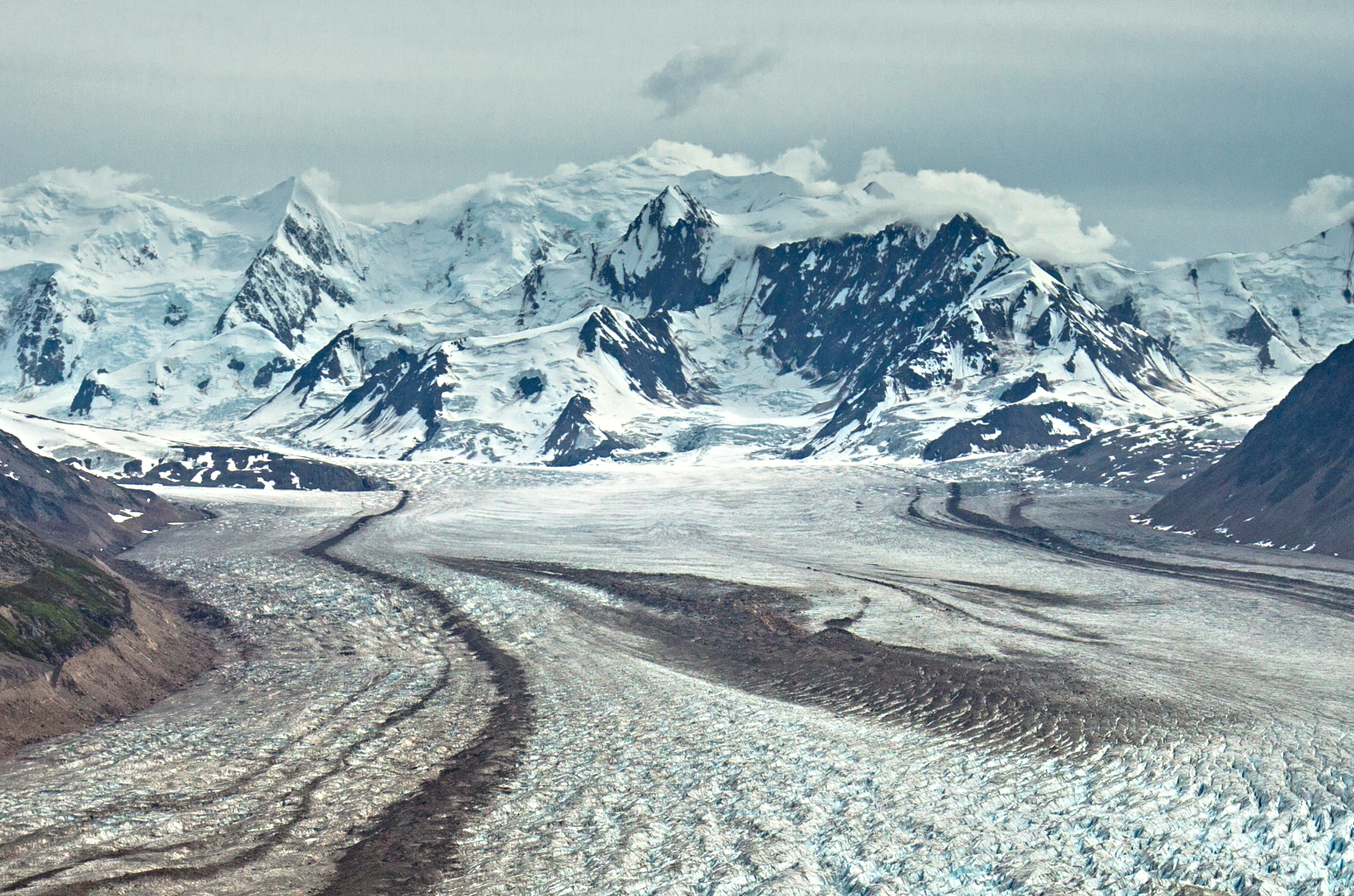
- Mount Tom White and Fan Glacier

Highest point
- Elevation: 11,191 ft (3,411 m)
- Prominence: 7,591 ft (2,314 m)
- Parent peak: Mount Blackburn
- Isolation: 73 mi (117 km)
- Listing: Ultras of the United States (30th); Ultra-prominents of Alaska (17th)
- Coordinates: 60°39′06″N 143°41′50″W

Geography
- Location within Alaska
- Location: Chugach National Forest; Chugach Census Area; Alaska, United States
- Parent range: Chugach Mountains
- Topo map: USGS Bering Glacier C-8

Climbing
- First ascent: 1973 Story Clark, Chris Hall, Tom Kizzia, William Resor, Sarah Robey, Don White
- Easiest route: Mountaineering expedition

Mount Tom White is a prominent 11,191-foot (3,411 meter) glaciated mountain summit located in the Chugach Mountains, in the U.S. state of Alaska. The remote peak is situated on land managed by Chugach National Forest, 72 mi (116 km) northeast of Cordova, and 20 mi (32 km) north of the Bering Glacier, North America's largest glacier. The mountain lies within the Copper River drainage basin, and is the eighth-highest major peak in the Chugach Mountains. Topographic relief is significant as it ranks 17th in prominence for all peaks in Alaska, and 52nd for all North America peaks. The first ascent of the mountain was made in 1973 by Story Clark, Chris Hall, Tom Kizzia, William Resor, Sarah Robey, and Don White.

== Tom White ==
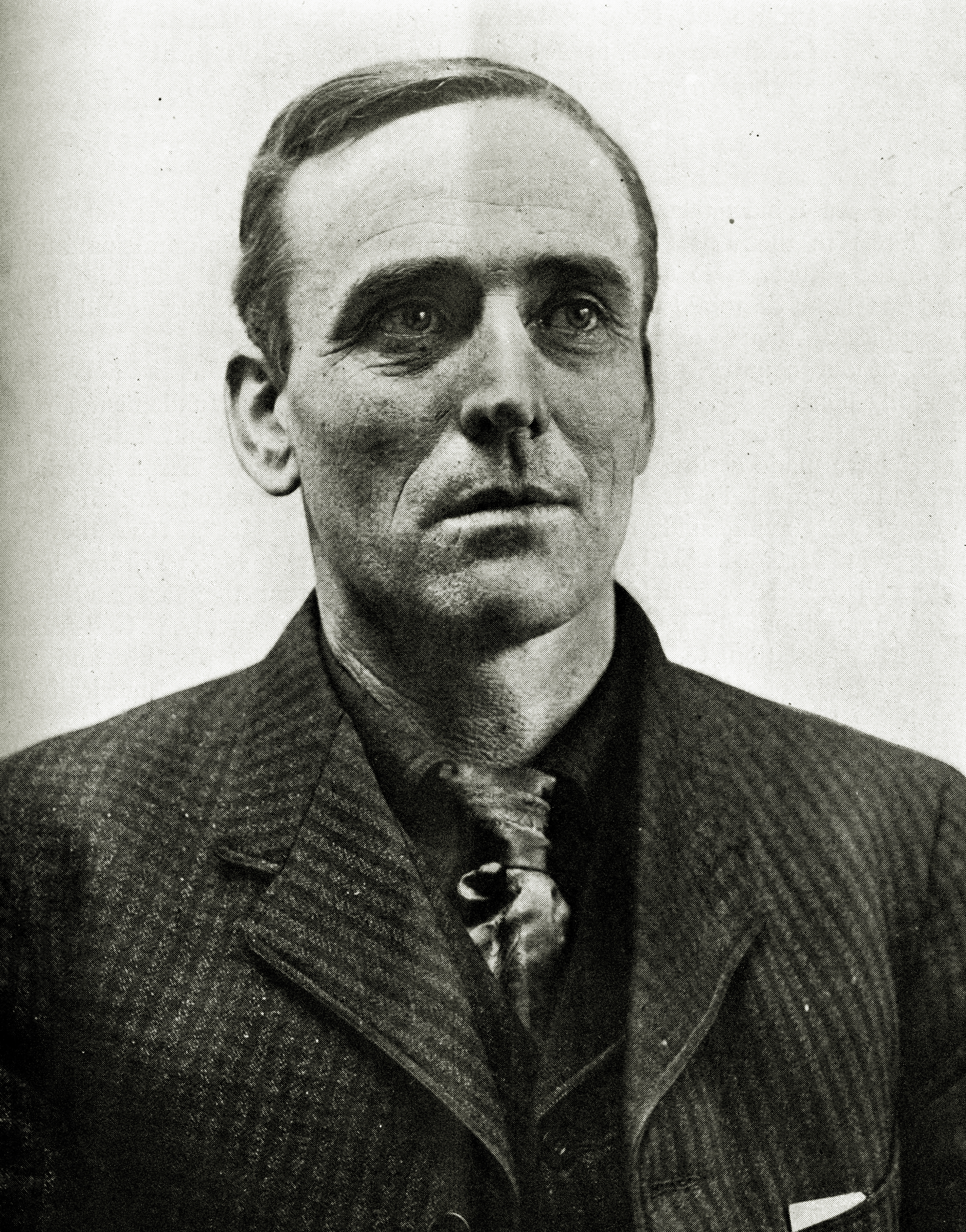
Tom White

The peak was named for Thomas George White, an early pioneer of the southeastern Alaska Territory who first went to Alaska as a camp hand with the first Geological Survey-National Geographic St. Elias Expedition, and returned with the second St. Elias expedition in 1891. Following the end of the second expedition, Tom stayed in Alaska "to try his fortune in gold mining". Known as the "Sourdough Driller," he is credited with discovering the Katalla oil seep in 1894, and drilling the first oil well in Alaska in 1902. The mountain's toponym was officially adopted in 1950 by the U.S. Board on Geographic Names.

== Climate ==
Based on the Köppen climate classification, Mount Tom White is located in a subarctic climate zone, with long, cold, snowy winters, and cool summers. Winds coming off the Gulf of Alaska are forced upwards by the Chugach Mountains (orographic lift), causing heavy precipitation in the form of rainfall and snowfall. Winter temperatures can drop below −20 °C with wind chill factors below −30 °C. This climate supports the Miles Glacier to the west, Martin River Glacier to the south, Fan Glacier to the north, and Bagley Icefield to the east. The months May through June offer the most favorable weather for viewing and climbing.

== See also ==
- List of mountain peaks of Alaska
- Geography of Alaska
