= Port Alexander Seaplane Base =

- IATA: PTD; ICAO: PAAP; FAA LID: AHP

Summary
- Airport type: Public
- Owner: Alaska DOT&PF - Southeast Region
- Serves: Port Alexander, Alaska
- Elevation AMSL: 0 ft / 0 m
- Coordinates: 56°14′49″N 134°38′53″W

Map
- Location of airport in Alaska

Runways
Direction	Length		Surface
Direction	ft	m	Surface
N/S	3,000	914	Water

Statistics (2006)
- Aircraft operations: 325
- Source: Federal Aviation Administration

Port Alexander Seaplane Base (IATA: PTD, ICAO: PAAP, FAA LID: AHP) is a city owned, public use seaplane base located in Port Alexander, a city at the southeastern corner of Baranof Island in the Petersburg Borough of the U.S. state of Alaska. It is included in the National Plan of Integrated Airport Systems for 2011–2015, which categorized it as a general aviation facility.

As per Federal Aviation Administration records, the airport had 139 passenger boardings (enplanements) in calendar year 2008, 189 enplanements in 2009, and 146 in 2010. Scheduled airline passenger service is subsidized by the United States Department of Transportation via the Essential Air Service program.

Although most U.S. airports use the same three-letter location identifier for the FAA and IATA, Port Alexander is assigned AHP by the FAA and PTD by the IATA. The airport's ICAO identifier is PAAP.

== Facilities and aircraft ==
Port Alexander Seaplane Base has one seaplane landing area designated N/S which measures 3,000 by 300 feet (914 x 91 m). For the 12-month period ending December 31, 2006, the airport had 325 aircraft operations, an average of 27 per month: 77% air taxi and 23% general aviation.

== Airlines and destinations ==
The following airline offers scheduled passenger service:

Airlines	Destinations
Baranautica Air Service	Sitka Seaplane Base

== See also ==
- List of airports in Alaska

== Other sources ==
- Essential Air Service documents (Docket DOT-OST-1999-6244) from the U.S. Department of Transportation:
  - Order 2004-4-11 (April 16, 2004): tentatively re-selects Harris Aircraft Services, Inc. (Harris Air), to provide Essential Air Service (EAS) at Port Alexander, Alaska, for a new, two-year period, through February 28, 2006, at an annual subsidy rate of $35,206.
  - Order 2006-4-12 (April 7, 2006): selecting Harris Aircraft Services, Inc. (Harris Air), to continue providing essential air service (EAS) at Port Alexander, Alaska, for a new two-year period, through February 29, 2008, at an annual subsidy rate of $48,746.
  - Order 2008-1-5 (January 11, 2008): selected Harris Aircraft Services, Inc. (Harris Air), to continue to provide essential air service (EAS) at Port Alexander, Alaska, for the two-year period through February 28, 2010, and established an annual subsidy rate of $49,739, for service consisting of two nonstop round trips each week to Sitka with 3-seat Cessna 185 aircraft.
  - Order 2009-12-3 (December 7, 2009): selecting Harris Aircraft Services, Inc. (Harris Air), to continue providing essential air service (EAS) at Port Alexander, Alaska, and establishing an annual subsidy rate of $60,083, for a new two-year period, through February 29, 2012.
  - Order 2012-2-15 (February 21, 2012): selecting Harris Aircraft Services, Inc. ("Harris Air"), to continue providing Essential Air Service (EAS) at Port Alexander, Alaska, for the two-year period through February 28, 2014, and establishing an annual subsidy rate of $75,293, for service consisting of two nonstop round trips each week to Sitka with 3-seat Cessna 185 aircraft.
