= Captain William Moore Bridge =

Historic bridge in Alaska, US

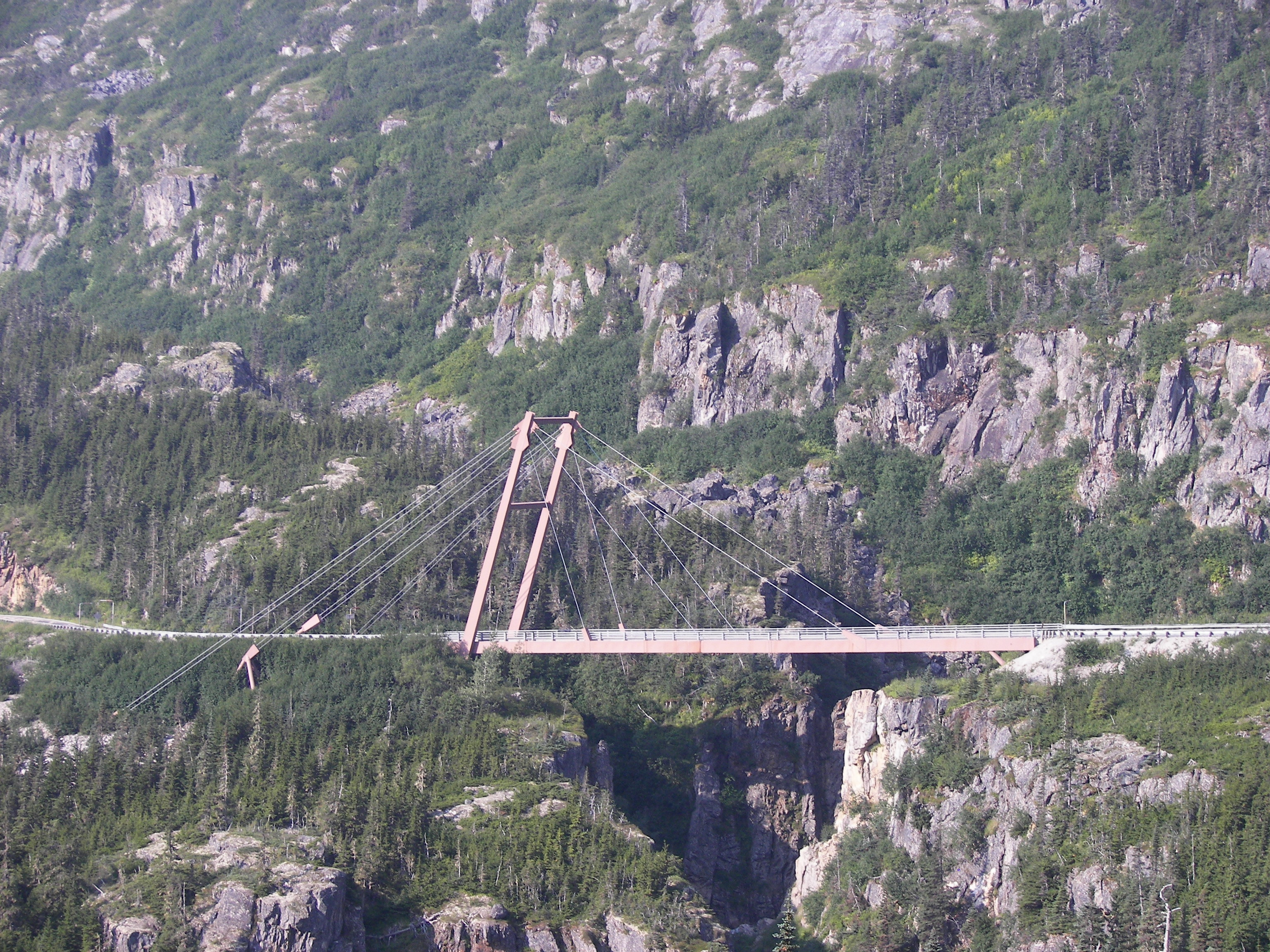
- cantilever cable-stayed bridge anchored on the south bank (left) spans the gorge and seismic fault to the unstable north bank (right)
- Coordinates: 59°35′06.0″N 135°11′48.0″W
- Carries: Klondike Highway (AK 98)
- Crosses: William Moore Creek Gorge
- Locale: Skagway Municipality, Alaska
- Other name(s): William Henry Moore Bridge
- Owner: State of Alaska Department of Transportation and Public Facilities
- Heritage status: first and only cantilever cable-stayed bridge in Alaska

Characteristics
- Design: asymmetric single-pylon cable-stayed bridge
- Material: Steel, concrete, timber deck
- Total length: 300-foot (91 m)
- Width: 35-foot (11 m)
- Height: 106-foot (32 m) pylon inclined forward over gorge 15° from the vertical
- Longest span: 270-foot (82 m)
- No. of spans: 2 = 30-foot (9.1 m) sidespan and 270-foot (82 m) mainspan
- Clearance above: 180-foot (55 m) above the creek

History
- Designer: State of Alaska Department of Transportation Bridge Design Section, 1974
- Opened: 1976
- Closed: 2019, repurposed as a wayside historic attraction and pedestrian viewpoint

Statistics
- Daily traffic: conventional, plus ore trucks up to 160,000 pounds from Yukon mines to Skagway

The Captain William Moore Bridge is an historic 300-foot (91 m) asymmetric single-pylon cable-stayed bridge on the Klondike Highway that spans the Moore Creek Gorge in the borough of Skagway, Alaska, United States, about 17 miles (27 km) north of the city of Skagway. Before the bridge was built in 1976, Whitehorse, Yukon, was only accessible from Skagway by the White Pass and Yukon Route railroad. The bridge connects Skagway to the Yukon highway network and allows traffic to pass over the Moore Creek Gorge, which flows along a fault line. To minimize bridge damage from earthquake movements along the fault line, the bridge was designed with anchors only at one end, which in this case was the south bank. Over the decades, heavy ore truck traffic weakened the bridge. In 2019 a replacement buried bridge located 150 feet west of the historic bridge was opened, and the 1976 cable-stayed bridge was repurposed as a pedestrian viewpoint and wayside historic attraction.

It's historic and beautiful, and is the only cantilevered cable-stayed bridge in Alaska...

== Design ==
Designed in 1974 by the engineers in the State of Alaska Department of Transportation Bridge Design Section, the cable-stayed bridge features a single H-shaped pylon anchored on the south bank, with two pairs of back stays to stabilize the forward-inclined 106-foot (32 m) tall pylon at 15 degrees from the vertical, and three pairs of forward cable stays in a fan array to support the two-lane box-girder main span deck, 270-foot (82 m) long, over the gorge. Since the gorge is an active seismic fault line, the bridge was designed to be firmly attached on the south bank, while the north end could undergo considerable movement in an earthquake without damaging the bridge. Moreover, the unstable rock condition of the north bank could not support the standard truss or concrete slab construction bridge. Thus this unconventional design, innovative at the time, was motivated by the local geological conditions of the crossing.

In 1974 the bridge was designed to carry a normal highway load; in 1986 the bridge was strengthened to handle ore trucks up to 160,000 pounds traveling from the Yukon mines to Skagway. Since its 1976 opening, the heavy load traffic over the decades, including the large ore mining trucks, has weakened the bridge and its load carrying capacity to the point of needing replacement. In addition, the bridge is too narrow to meet current highway standards as of 2015.

== Replacement ==
After evaluating several alternatives, the State elected to straighten about half a mile of the Klondike Highway and locate a replacement buried bridge about 150 feet west of the cable-stayed bridge, for a budget of about $19,000,000. Construction started in 2017 with a corrugated steel bridge (75 feet span, 25 feet high, 40 feet wide) set on footings on the bottom of the gorge, permitting free flowing of the creek water. Then, borrowing techniques used to construct a dam, back filling to cover (or bury) the steel bridge, making it function as a large culvert, and finally building the road deck on the top of the roller compacted concrete fill-in. The choice of a buried bridge as a replacement for the historic cable-stayed bridge was for two reasons: better geological response to local seismic activities and a much longer useful life of about 100 years. Because the replacement bridge is buried out of sight, to motorists it appears as a non-bridge embankment.

Construction of the replacement buried bridge with the realigned Klondike Highway approach was completed in the fall of 2019, and the 43-years-old cable-stayed bridge was repurposed as a pedestrian walkway and wayside historic attraction.

== See also ==
- John O'Connell Bridge, the first cable-stayed bridge in Alaska
