= Sitka Naval Operating Base and U.S. Army Coastal Defenses =

Historic district in Alaska, United States

- Sitka Naval Operating Base and US Army Coastal Defenses
- U.S. National Register of Historic Places
- U.S. National Historic Landmark District
- Alaska Heritage Resources Survey
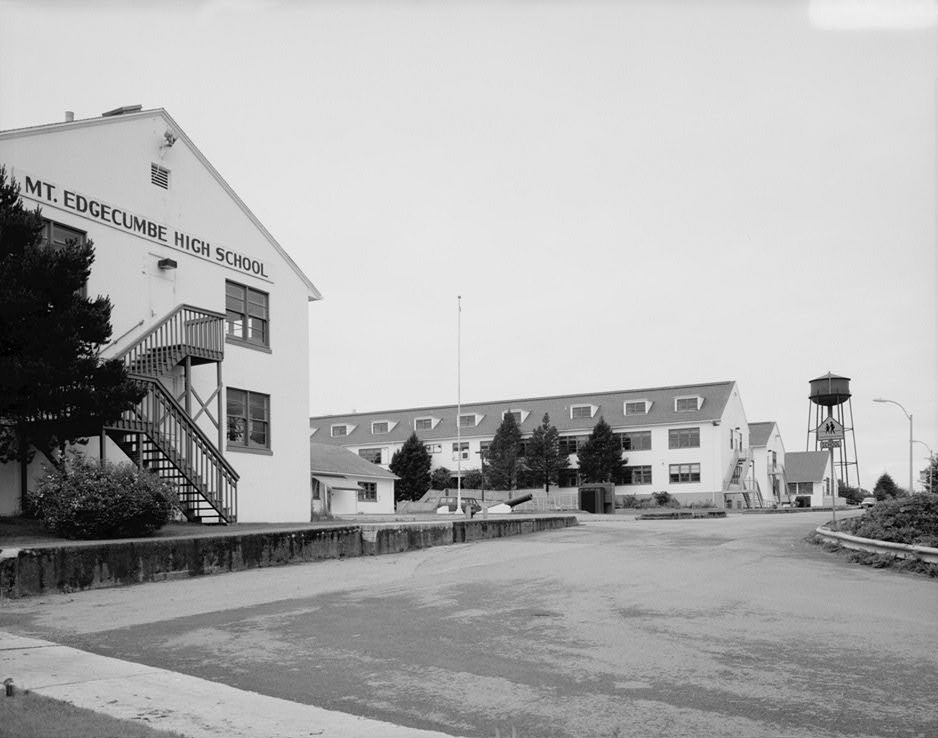
- Headquarters and barracks buildings at the base

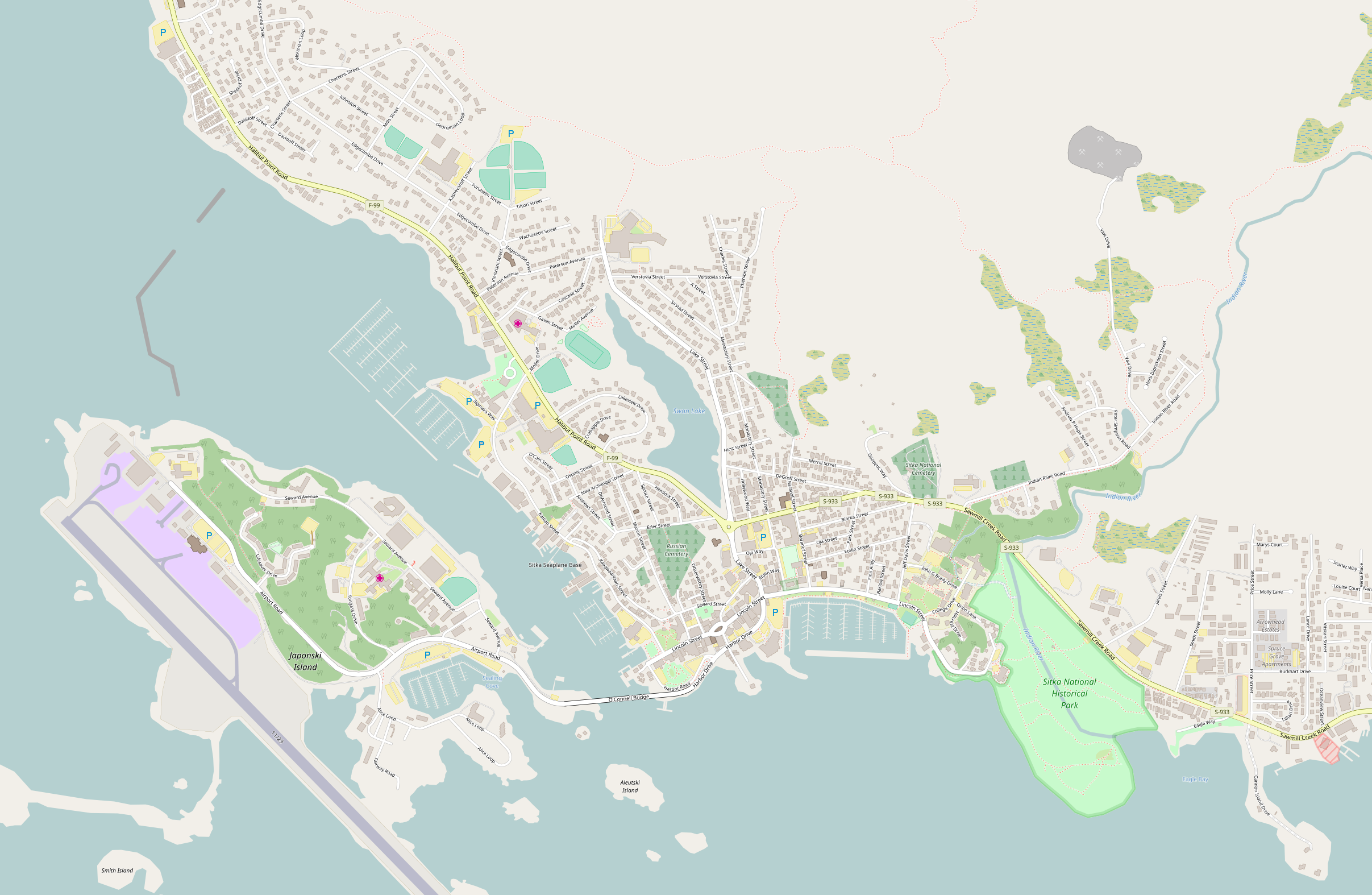
- Location within Sitka Location within Alaska
- Location: Japonski Island, Makhnati Island and the causeway connecting them
- Nearest city: Sitka, Alaska
- Coordinates: 57°02′58″N 135°21′35″W
- Area: 510 acres (210 ha)
- Built: 1939
- Built by: US Navy Seabees
- NRHP reference No.: 86003559
- AHRS No.: SIT-029

Significant dates
- Added to NRHP: August 11, 1986
- Designated NHLD: August 11, 1986

The Sitka Naval Operating Base and U.S. Army Coastal Defenses are the surviving elements of the World War II-era defenses and defense establishments in and around Sitka, Alaska. These facilities, in particular the airfields and naval bases, played a key role in the defense of Alaska, and in military operations against Japanese forces which occupied Attu and Kiska, two remote islands in the Aleutian chain. The Sitka facilities were designated a National Historic Landmark District in 1986.

== Description and history ==
In consideration of the possibility of war in the Pacific Ocean, the United States War Department in 1937 established a small naval station near Sitka, Alaska as a base for a small fleet of PBY Catalina seaplanes. In 1939 Congress appropriate funds for the construction of naval air stations at Sitka and other sites in coastal Alaska. The Sitka station was built on Japonski Island, just west of Sitka Harbor, on land that had been under United States Navy jurisdiction since the Alaska Purchase in 1867. The Sitka Naval Air Station was formally commissioned on October 1, 1939. What was then not much more than a coal resupply station rapidly grew, with a radio station, barracks, and other facilities constructed, mainly on the north side of the island. In March 1941 United States Army forces arrived in Sitka, and began construction of a coastal defense battery on Makhnati Island, an islet at the western end of a chain of islets extending westward from Japonski Island. To facilitate this work, a causeway 8,100 feet (2,500 m) in length was constructed connecting Japonski to Mahknati via this island chain. These facilities were the only significant American military facilities in the North Pacific when the Japanese bombed Pearl Harbor in December 1941, even though they were still a work in progress.

The naval facilities on Japonski Island eventually grew to include several hangars, ramps into the water to facilitate the movement of seaplanes onto land, a large concrete parking area, a control tower, two piers, and a number of ancillary support buildings. On the island the Navy also had a system for landing and launching aircraft similar to that used on aircraft carriers, but none of these facilities have survived.

Along the causeway to Makhnati Island, a number of facilities were built for the Army coastal defense units. The major facility, Fort Rousseau, was on Makhnati, and housed two six-inch guns, two 155mm guns, magazines, and the army command post. A secondary battery was placed on Sasedni Island, where there were also barracks and a mess hall, and Virublennoi Island housed three ammunition bunkers. The batteries were not completed until after the Japanese had been driven from Attu and Kiska, and saw no action. The army closed its base at Sitka in spring 1944, and are now little more than foundations and concrete structures.

The surviving elements of the Sitka Naval Operating Base, the causeway to Makhnati Island, and the coastal defense station were designated a National Historic Landmark on August 11, 1986.

== See also ==
- List of National Historic Landmarks in Alaska
- National Register of Historic Places listings in Sitka City and Borough, Alaska
