= John O'Connell Bridge =

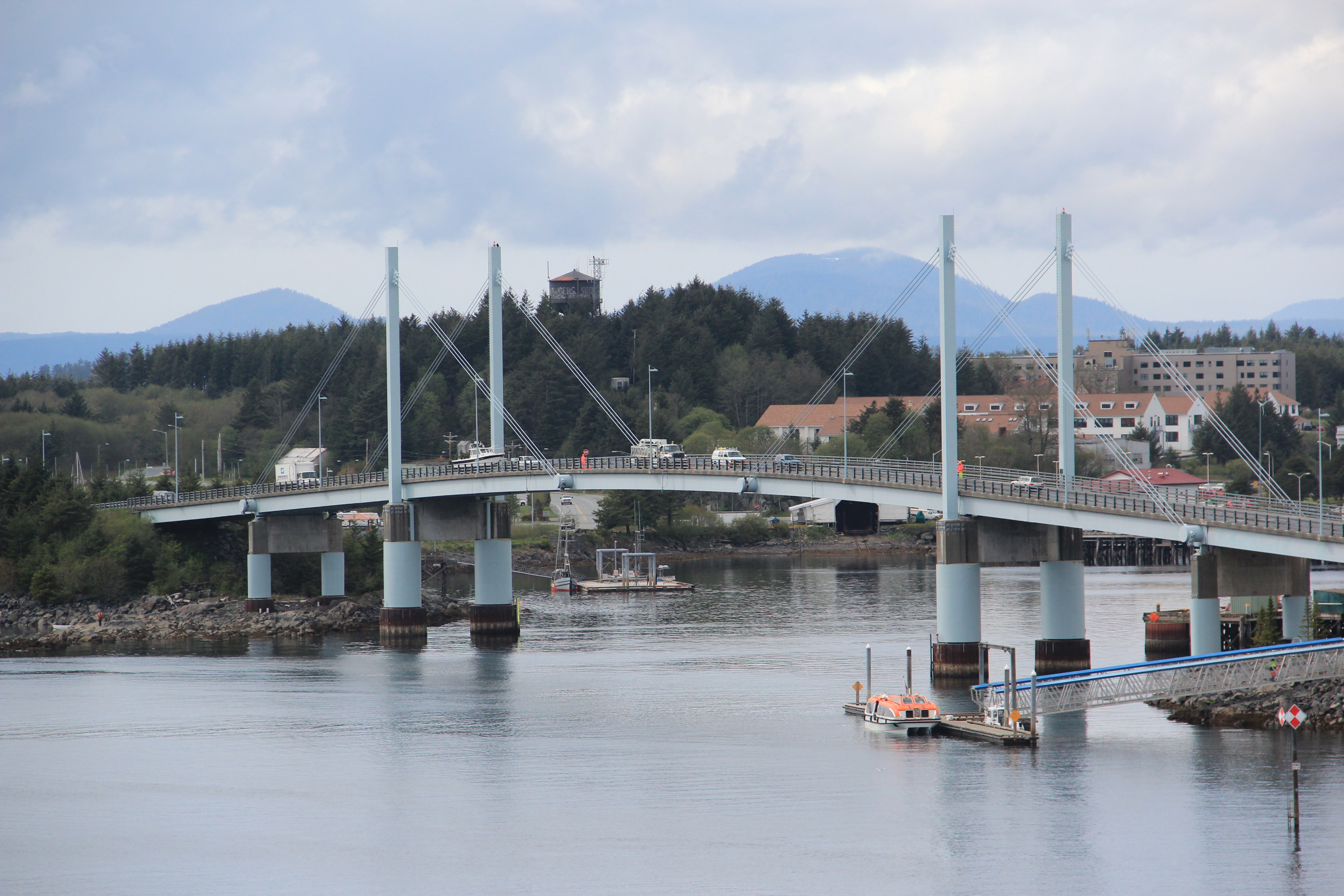
- The John O'Connell Bridge over the Sitka Channel
- Coordinates: 57.047899°N 135.340627°W
- Carries: 2 lanes of AK-935
- Crosses: Sitka Channel
- Locale: Sitka, Alaska

Characteristics
- Design: Cable-stayed bridge
- Material: Steel (pylons) composite steel-reinforced concrete (deck)
- Total length: 1,255 feet (383 m)
- Width: 38 feet (11.6 m)
- Longest span: 450 feet (137 m)
- Clearance below: 52 feet (15.8 m)

History
- Construction end: 1971
- Opened: 1972

Statistics
- Daily traffic: 4,900 (2008)

Location
- Interactive map of John O'Connell Bridge

The John O'Connell Bridge is a cable-stayed bridge over the Sitka Channel located in Sitka, Alaska. The bridge connects the town of Sitka on Baranof Island to the airport and Coast Guard Station on Japonski Island. Until the bridge was completed in 1971, the commute was only achievable through a ferry service. The bridge is named after John W. O'Connell, a former mayor of Sitka. The two-lane bridge is 1,255 feet (383 m) in total length, with a main span of 450 feet (140 m). The bridge was also the United States' first vehicular cable-stayed girder spanned bridge. The four 100-foot-high (30 m) steel pylons carry two three-cable sets, each carrying a section of the bridge deck. Special consideration was given to the bridge's aesthetics due to its proximity to nearby Castle Hill.

Approximately 4000 vehicles cross the bridge every day, up from the approximate 1000 shore boat passengers per day prior to the bridge's completion.

A man from Bellingham, Washington died in August 2015 after jumping off the bridge to swim ashore.

The bridge was designated as an Alaska Historic Civil Engineering Landmark by the American Society of Civil Engineers in 2022.

== See also ==
- Captain William Moore Bridge, the only cantilever cable-stayed bridge in Alaska
- List of bridges documented by the Historic American Engineering Record in Alaska
