= Japonski Island =

Island in Sitka City, Alaska

Coordinates: 57°03′08″N 135°21′36″W

Native name: Yak'w Kashaneixí
- Interactive map of Japonski Island

Geography
- Location: ABC islands of Alaska
- Archipelago: Alexander Archipelago

Administration
- United States
- State: Alaska

Demographics
- Population: 269 (2000)

Japonski Island (Russian: Остров Японский, romanized: Ostrov Yaponskiy, Japanese: ヤポンスキー島, romanized: Yaponsukī-Shima, Tlingit: Yak'w Kashaneixí) is a small island in the city of Sitka in the Alexander Archipelago of southeastern Alaska, United States. It lies across the Sitka Channel from Sitka's central business district.

The island's name was devised during the Russian colonial period in reference to Japanese fishermen who were stranded there in 1805 and returned to Ezo in 1806. The term Yaponskiy is the Russian language demonym for Japanese people.

Japonski Island is connected to Baranof Island and Sitka by the O'Connell Bridge. Before the bridge there was a ferry system similar to that which currently exists in Ketchikan. They carried approximately 1000 passengers a day from 1946 to 1972.

Japonski Island is home to Sitka Rocky Gutierrez Airport; the Sitka branch campus of the University of Alaska Southeast; Mt. Edgecumbe High School — a state-run boarding school for rural Alaskans; the Indian Health Service regional hospital SEARHC (SouthEast Alaska Regional Healthcare Center); a United States Coast Guard air station; the port and facilities for the USCGC Kukui; and the restored boathouse maintained by the Sitka Maritime Heritage Society. Besides the Coast Guard housing complex, there are very few Sitkans who live on Japonski Island. The official population was 269 persons at the 2000 census. The land area of Japonski Island, including the connected nearby much smaller islands such as Virublennoi (Russian for "harvested" or "cut out"), Sasedni (Russian for "neighbor"), Kirushkin (probably a Russian surname), Makhnati (Russian for "shaggy") and smaller islets, was 1.467 square kilometres (363 acres).

== Demographics ==
Historical population
Census	Pop.	Note	%±
1940	39		—
U.S. Decennial Census

Japonski Island appeared once separately on the 1940 U.S. Census as an unincorporated village. It was later annexed into Sitka.
