= Sitka Channel =

Strait separating Japonski and Baranof Islands, Alaska

Coordinates: 57.0517°N 135.3464°W

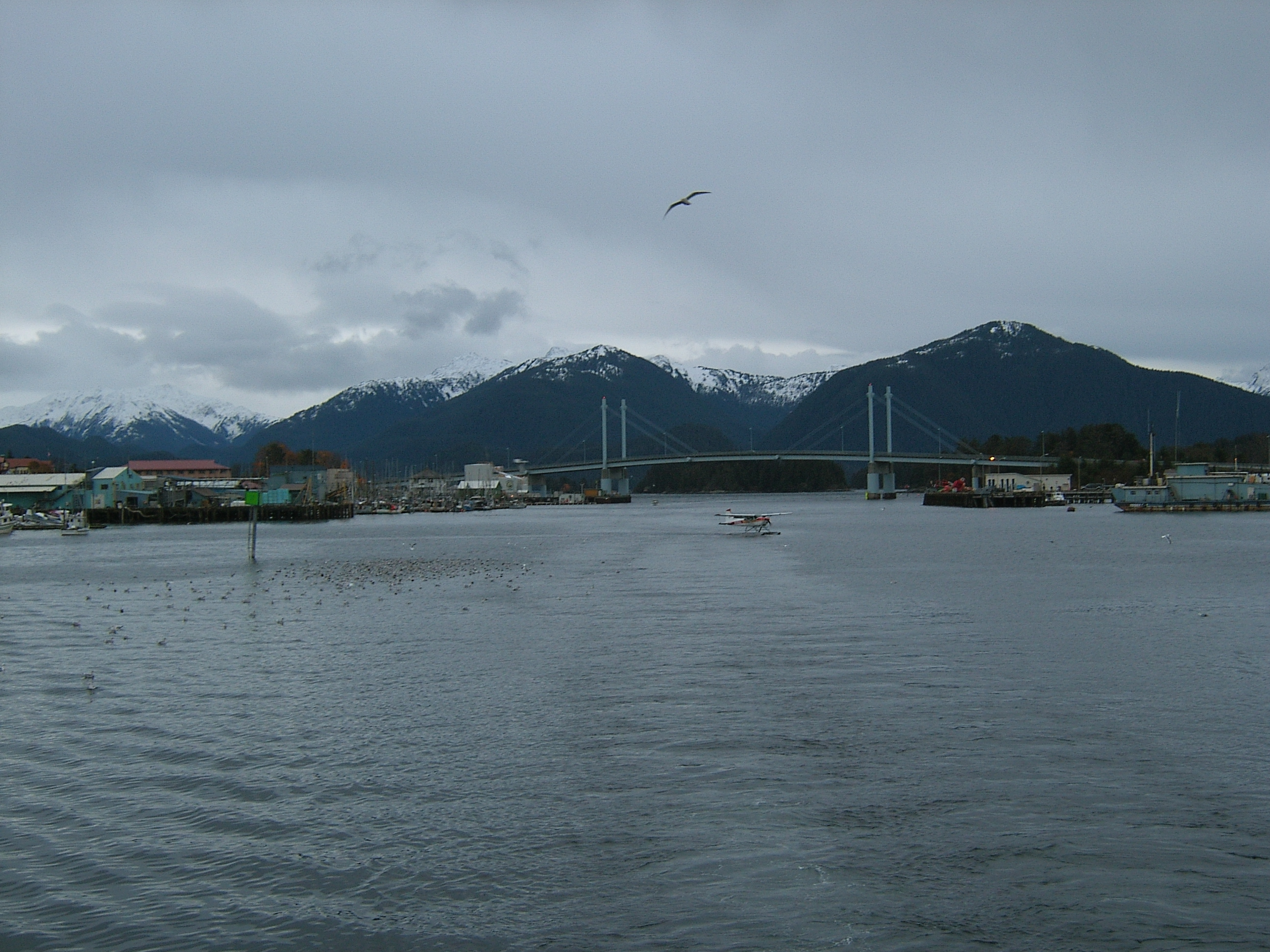
A view down Sitka Channel.

The Sitka Channel is a strait that separates Japonski Island from Baranof Island in Alaska.

The Sitka Channel, or more commonly referred to as simply The Channel by locals, is a notable feature of Sitka, Alaska that separates vital portions of infrastructure located on the peripheral Japonski Island from the rest of the community. Until 1972 the commute was only achievable through a schedule of shore boats that carried an estimated 1,000 people a day for 26 years. The ferries were retired when the John O'Connell Bridge was constructed (named after John W. O'Connell, a former mayor of Sitka).

The Sitka Channel features numerous wharfs, piers, seafood processing plants, and harbors serving its thriving seafood industries as well as port facilities for the United States Coast Guard vessel USCG Maple.
