= Copper River (Alaska) =

River in Alaska, United States

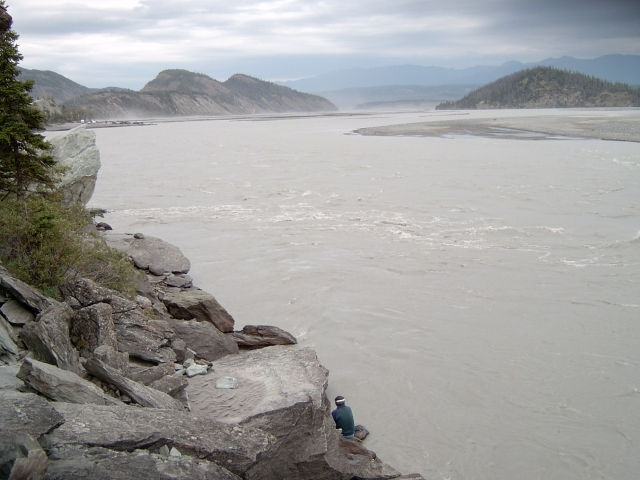
- A fisherman (bottom center) dipnetting for salmon on the Copper River at Chitina in Southcentral Alaska

Location
- Country: United States
- State: Alaska

Physical characteristics
- Source
  - location: Copper Glacier on Mount Wrangell
  - coordinates: 62°10′39″N 143°49′05″W
  - elevation: 4,380 ft (1,340 m)
- Mouth
  - location: Copper Bay of Pacific Ocean
  - coordinates: 60°23′19″N 144°57′39″W
  - elevation: 0 ft (0 m)
- Length: 290 mi (470 km)
- Basin size: 24,000 mi^{2} (62,000 km^{2})
- Discharge
  - average: 57,400 cu ft/s (1,630 m^{3}/s) at mouth

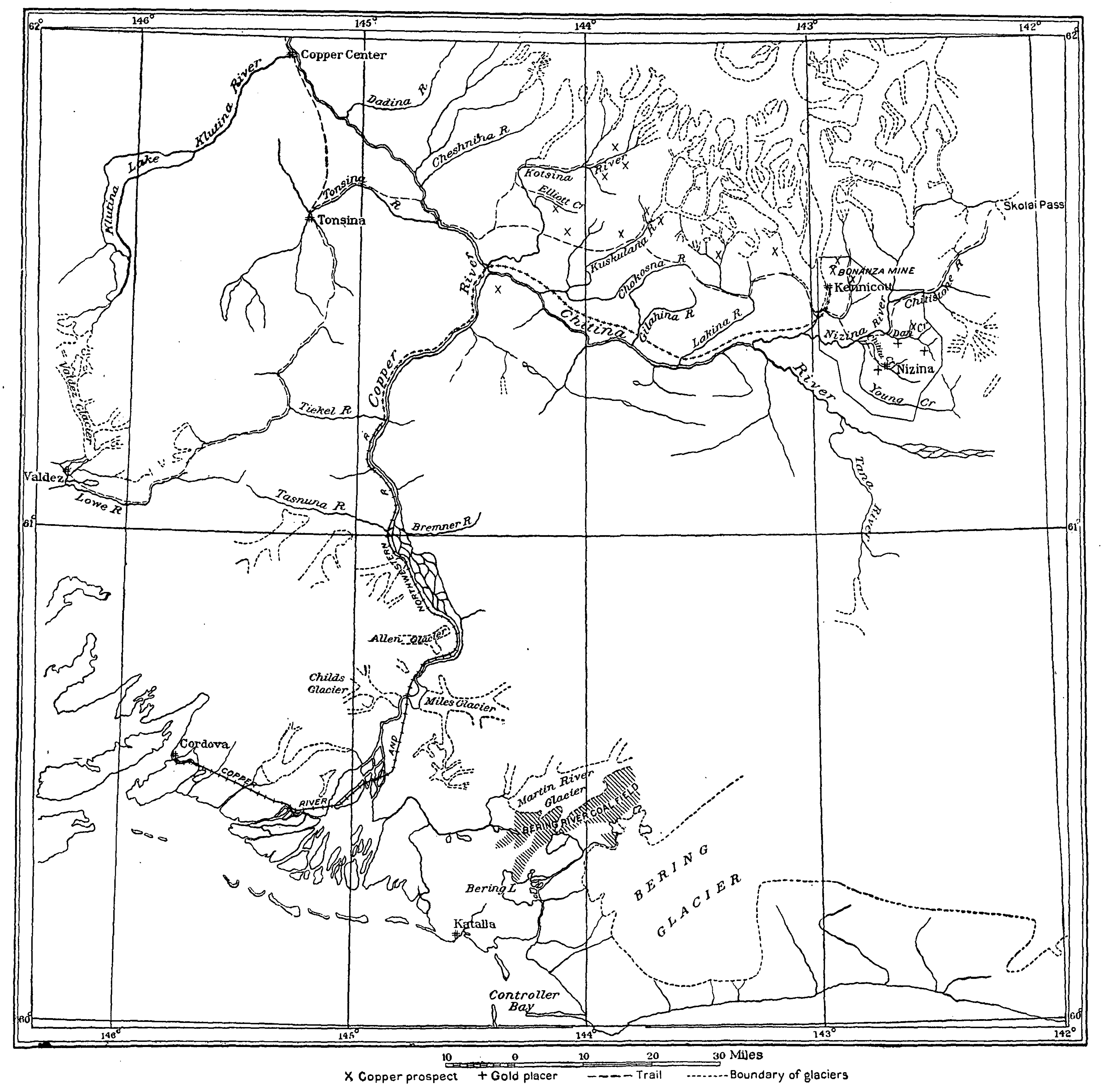
Southern portion of the Copper River

The Copper River or Ahtna River (/ˈɑːtnə/; Ahtena: ‘Atna’tuu [ʔatʰnaʔtʰuː], "river of the Ahtnas"; Tlingit: Eeḵhéeni [ʔìːq.híː.nì]), "river of copper", is a 290-mile (470 km) river in south-central Alaska in the United States. It drains a large region of the Wrangell Mountains and Chugach Mountains into the Gulf of Alaska. It is known for its extensive delta ecosystem, as well as for its prolific runs of wild salmon, which are among the most highly prized stocks in the world. The river is the tenth largest in the United States, as ranked by average discharge volume at its mouth.

== Description ==
The Copper River rises out of the Copper Glacier, which lies on the northeast side of Mount Wrangell, in the Wrangell Mountains, within Wrangell-Saint Elias National Park. It begins by flowing almost due north in a valley that lies on the east side of Mount Sanford, and then turns west, forming the northwest edge of the Wrangell Mountains and separating them from the Mentasta Mountains to the northeast. It continues to turn southeast, through a wide marshy plain to Chitina, where it is joined from the southeast by the Chitina River (Ahtna Athabascan Tsedi Na' [tʃɛ.diː.näʔ] < tsedi "copper" + na’ "river").

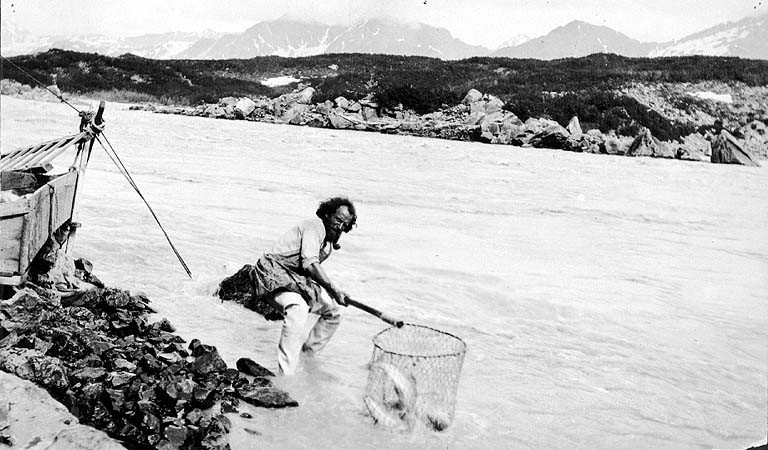
A man dip netting on the Copper River, undated photo by John Nathan Cobb (died 1930)

The Copper River is approximately 290 miles (470 km) long. It drops an average of about 12 feet per mile (2.3 m/km), and drains more than 24,000 square miles (62,000 km^{2})—an area the size of West Virginia. The river runs at an average of 7 miles per hour (11 km/h).

Downstream from its confluence with the Chitina it flows southwest, passing through a narrow glacier-lined gap in the Chugach Mountains within the Chugach National Forest east of Cordova Peak. There is an extensive area of linear sand dunes up to 250 feet (76 m) in height radiating from the mouth of the Copper River. Both Miles Glacier and Childs Glacier calve directly into the river. The Copper enters the Gulf of Alaska southeast of Cordova where it creates a delta nearly 50 miles (80 km) wide.

== History ==
The name of the river comes from the abundant copper deposits along the upper river that were used by Alaska Native population and then later by settlers from the Russian Empire and the United States. Extraction of the copper resources was problematic due to navigation difficulties at the river's mouth. The construction of the Copper River and Northwestern Railway from Cordova through the upper river valley from 1908 to 1911 allowed widespread extraction of the mineral resources, in particular from the Kennecott Mine, discovered in 1898. The mine was abandoned in 1938 and is now a ghost town tourist attraction and historic district maintained by the National Park Service.

Copper River Highway (Alaska Route 10) runs from Cordova to the lower Copper River near Childs Glacier, following the old railroad route and ending at the reconstructed Million Dollar Bridge across the river. The Tok Cut-Off (Alaska Route 1) follows the Copper River Valley on the north side of the Chugach Mountains.

== Fisheries ==
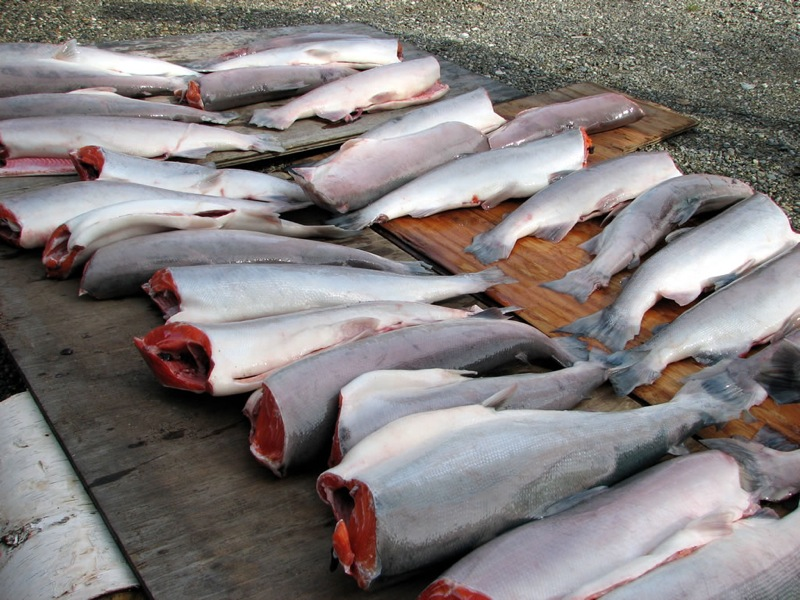
Copper River sockeyes, 2007

The river's famous salmon runs arise from the use of the river watershed by over 2 million salmon each year for spawning. The extensive runs result in many unique varieties, prized for their fat content. The river's commercial salmon season is very brief, beginning in May for chinook salmon, and sockeye salmon for periods lasting mere hours or several days at a time. Sport fishing by contrast is open all year-long, but peak season on the Copper River lasts from August to September, when the coho salmon runs. The fisheries are co-managed by the Alaska Department of Fish and Game (ADF&G) and the Department of the Interior Federal Subsistence Board. Management data is obtained primarily by ADF&G at the Miles Lake sonar station and via the native village of Eyak at the Baird Canyon and Canyon Creek research stations.

== Birding ==
The Copper River Delta, which extends for 700,000 acres (2,800 km^{2}), is the largest contiguous wetlands along the Pacific coast of North America. It is used annually by 16 million shorebirds, including the world's entire population of western sandpipers and the pacific flyway population of dunlins. It is also home to the world's largest population of nesting trumpeter swans and is the only known nesting site for the dusky Canada goose subspecies (Branta canadensis occidentalis).

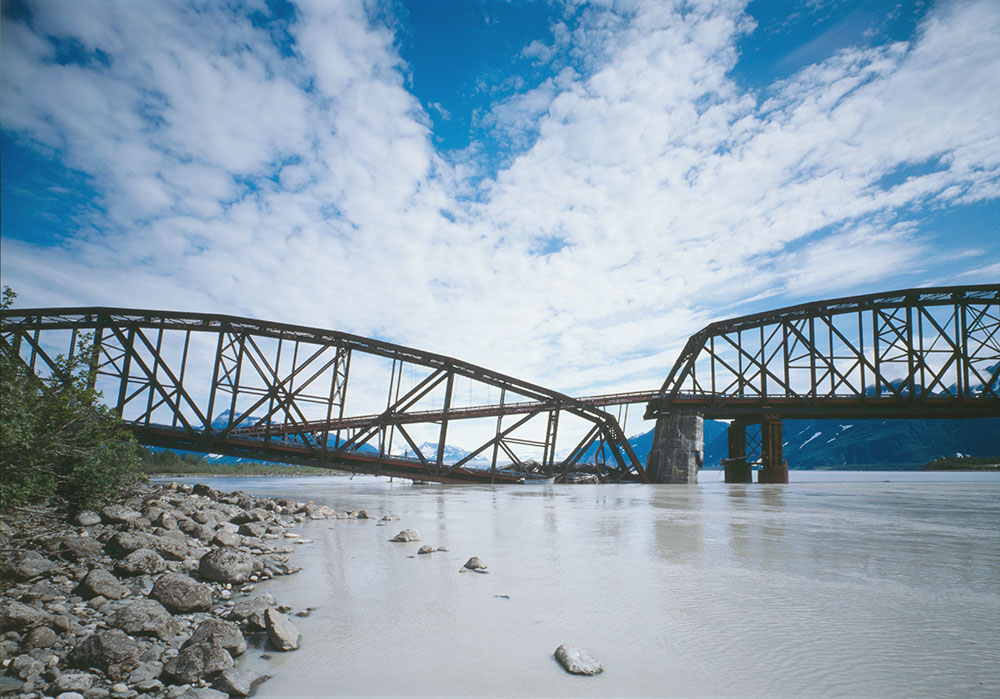
Miles Glacier Bridge, showing earthquake damage and temporary repair, 1984

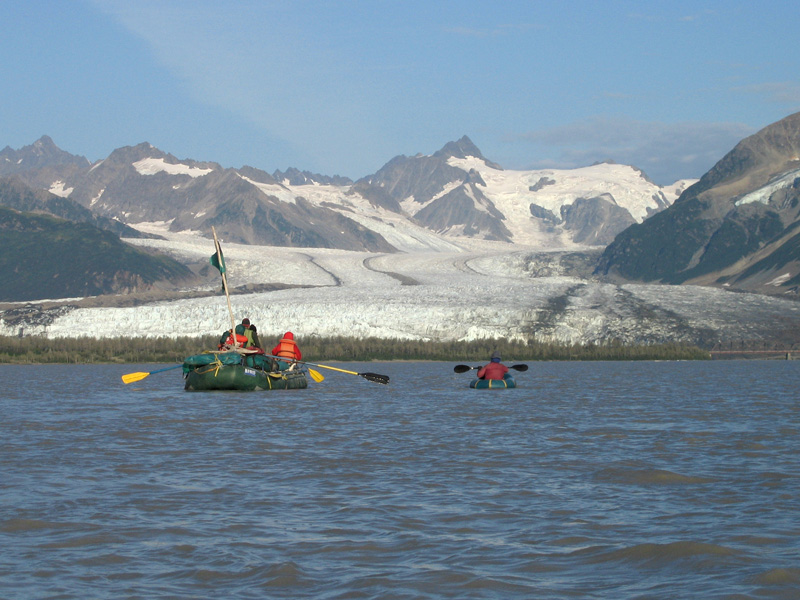
Rafters and Child's Glacier on the lower Copper River

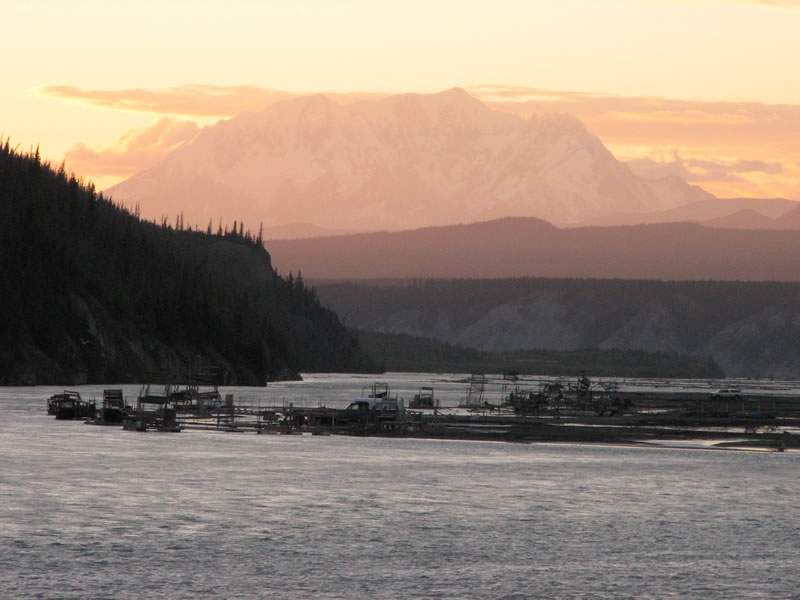
Fishwheels on the Copper River

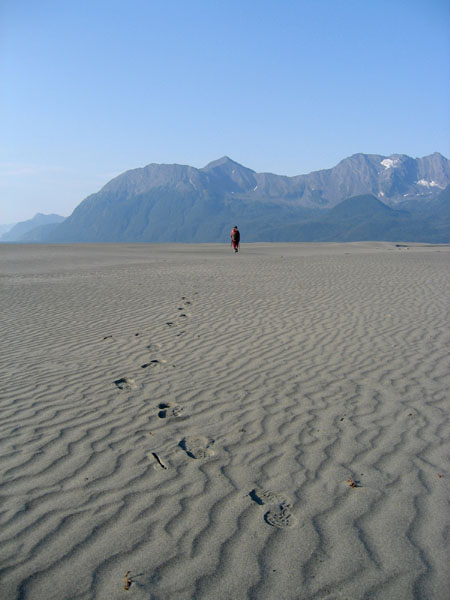
Sand dunes on the Copper River

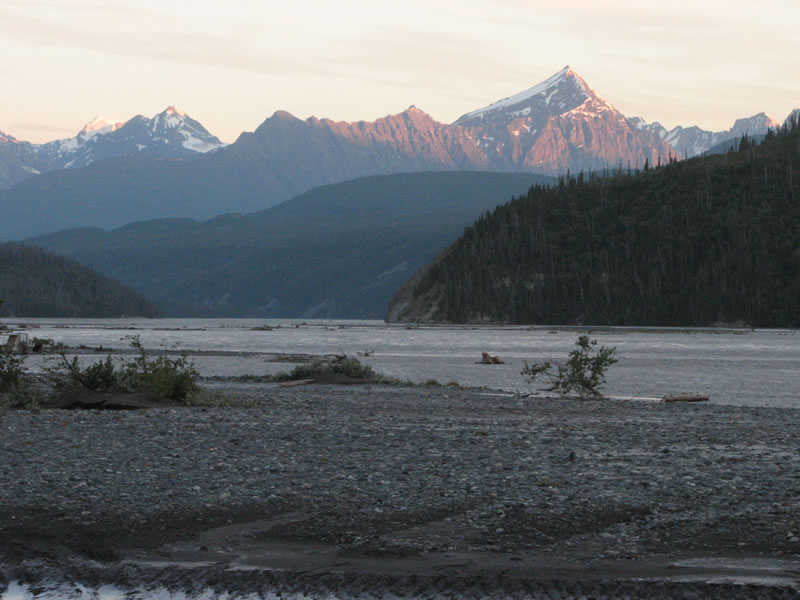
Copper River near Chitina, looking south from the bridge

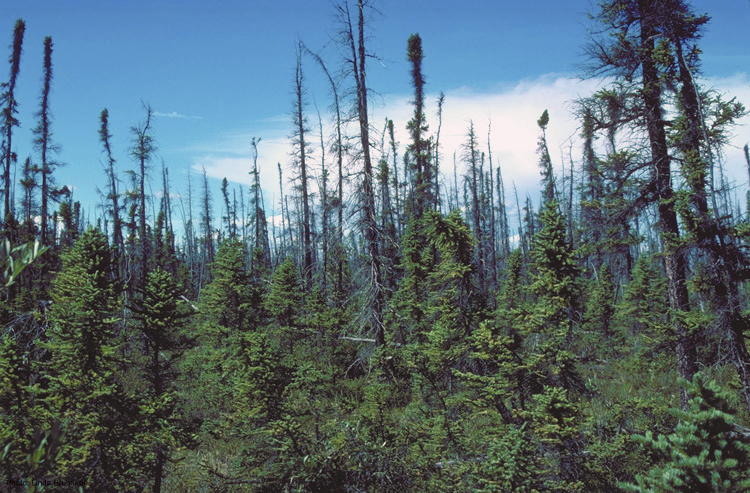
Black spruce taiga along the Copper River

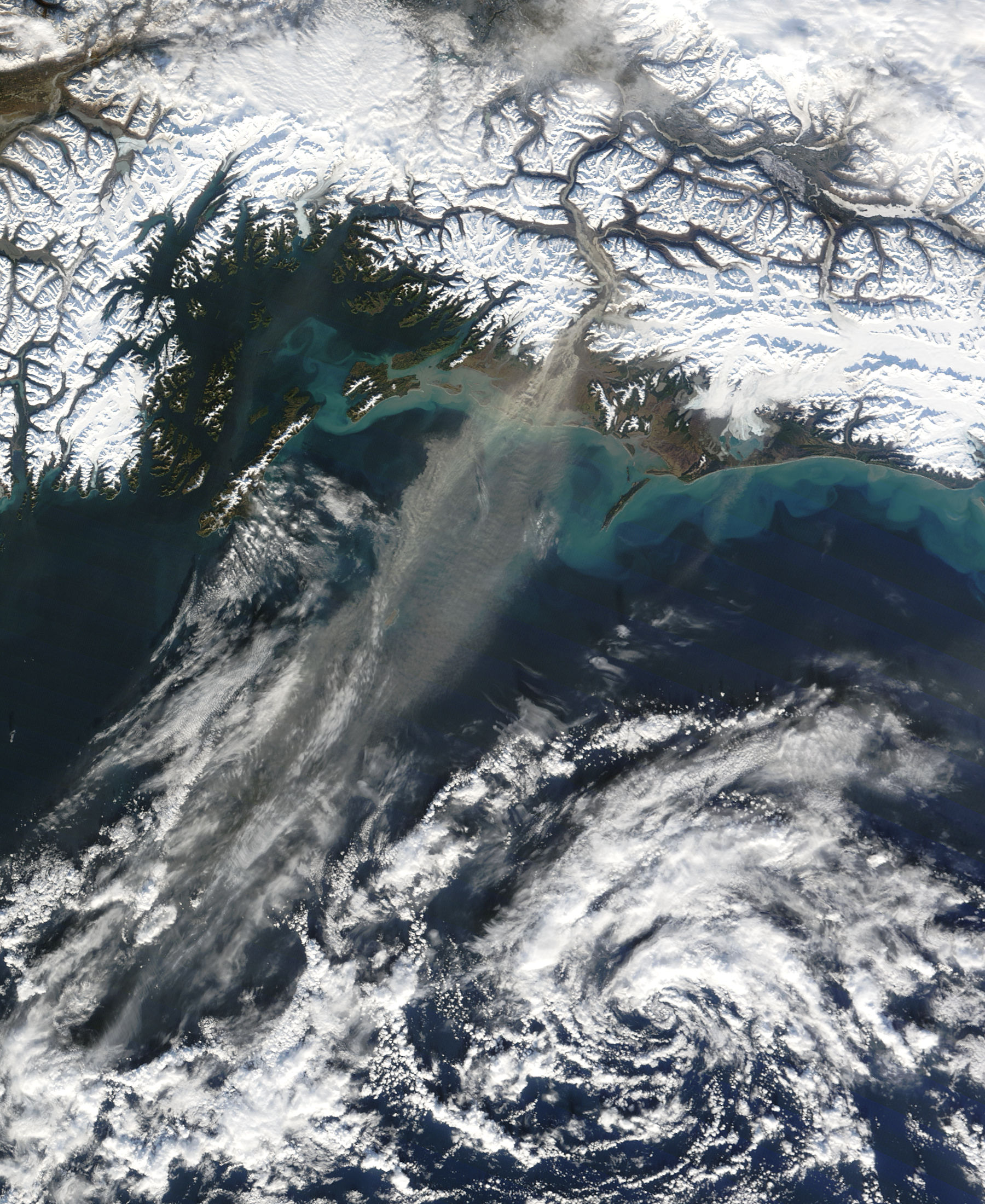
Wind picks up fine sediment from the riverbank and carries it over the ocean.

== See also ==
- List of rivers of Alaska
