= Copper River Highway =

Highway in Alaska

Copper River Highway

Route information
- Maintained by AkDOT&PF and the USFS
- Length: 49.5 mi (79.7 km)

Major junctions
- South end: 2nd Street in Cordova
- North end: The Million Dollar Bridge over the Miles Glacier

Location
- Country: United States
- State: Alaska

Highway system
- Alaska Routes; Interstate; Scenic Byways

The Copper River Highway extends 49.5 miles (79.7 km) from Cordova along the old railbed of the Copper River and Northwestern Railway. Construction began in 1945, and was originally intended to link Cordova with the state highway system at Chitina. The Million Dollar Bridge, which had carried trains until the CR&NW shut down, was converted for highway use. It is one of two discontinuous segments of Alaska Route 10.

The road extended only slightly beyond the bridge when the Good Friday earthquake of 1964 halted construction and severely damaged the Million Dollar Bridge, collapsing the north span. Temporary repairs were made, and the bridge continued to be used. Permanent repairs were not completed until 2005.

The first 12 miles (19 km) of the highway is paved; the rest is gravel. A primitive four-wheel-drive road continues for 10 miles (16 km) beyond the end of the highway to the Allen River.

The highway past mile 36 has been de facto abandoned since 2011 due to erosion of the approach to Bridge 339.

== Route description ==
The Copper River Highway begins at the Alaska Marine Highway ferry terminal in Cordova. From there, the highway proceeds through central Cordova, intersecting several small roads and passing residential and commercial buildings. The road exits Cordova, and passes the large Eyak Lake, proceeding to the Merle K. (Mudhole) Smith Airport. The highway then turns to a gravel road and proceeds east and then northeast through both Eyak Corporation land and the Chugach National Forest; however, after passing over several sloughs, the highway now stops after approximately 35 miles due to Bridge 339 having been washed out in 2011

== Major junctions ==
The entire route is in Valdez-Cordova Borough.

Location	mi	km	Destinations	Notes
Cordova	0.000	0.000	Alaska Marine Highway Terminal - Cordova	Western terminus
Cordova	0.449	0.723	Railroad Avenue	
Cordova	0.849	1.366	Council Avenue	
Cordova	1.095	1.762	2nd Street	
Cordova	1.376	2.214	Point Whitshed Road	
Cordova	1.793	2.886	Le Fevre Street	
Cordova	4.831	7.775	5 Mile Cutoff	
	5.307	8.541	Eyak River	
	13.696	22.042	Sheridan Glacier Road	
	22.284	35.863	Alaganik Slough Bridge	
	35	56	Bridge 339 washed out in 2011	
	49.458	79.595	Million Dollar Bridge	Eastern terminus
1.000 mi = 1.609 km; 1.000 km = 0.621 mi
