= Miles Glacier Bridge =

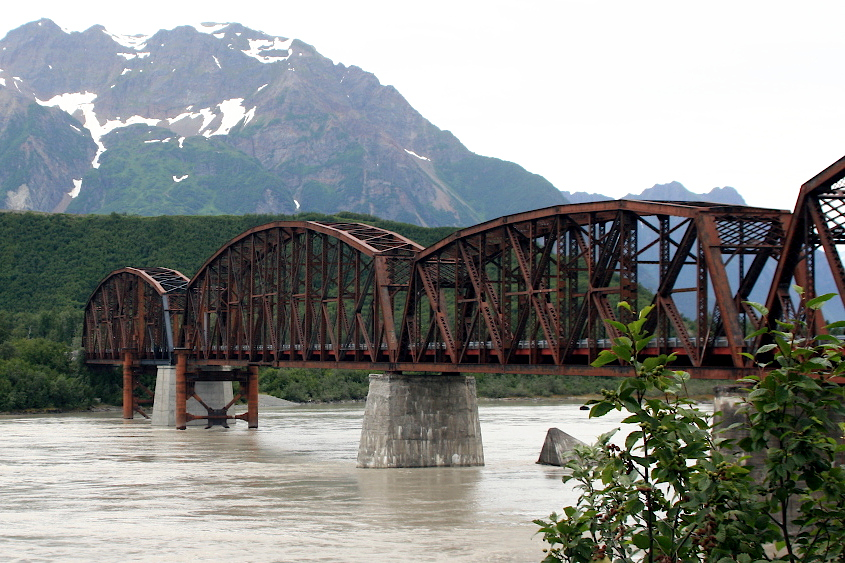
- Miles Glacier Bridge in 2008. The far left span as seen in this photo shows the repairs performed in 2004.
- Coordinates: 60°40′22″N 144°44′45″W
- Carries: Copper River Highway
- Crosses: Copper River
- Locale: Cordova, Alaska

Characteristics
- Design: through Pennsylvania (Petit) truss bridge
- Material: Steel and concrete
- Total length: 1,550 feet (470 m)
- No. of spans: 4
- Piers in water: 3

History
- Construction start: 1909
- Construction end: 1910
- Million Dollar Bridge
- U.S. National Register of Historic Places
- Alaska Heritage Resources Survey
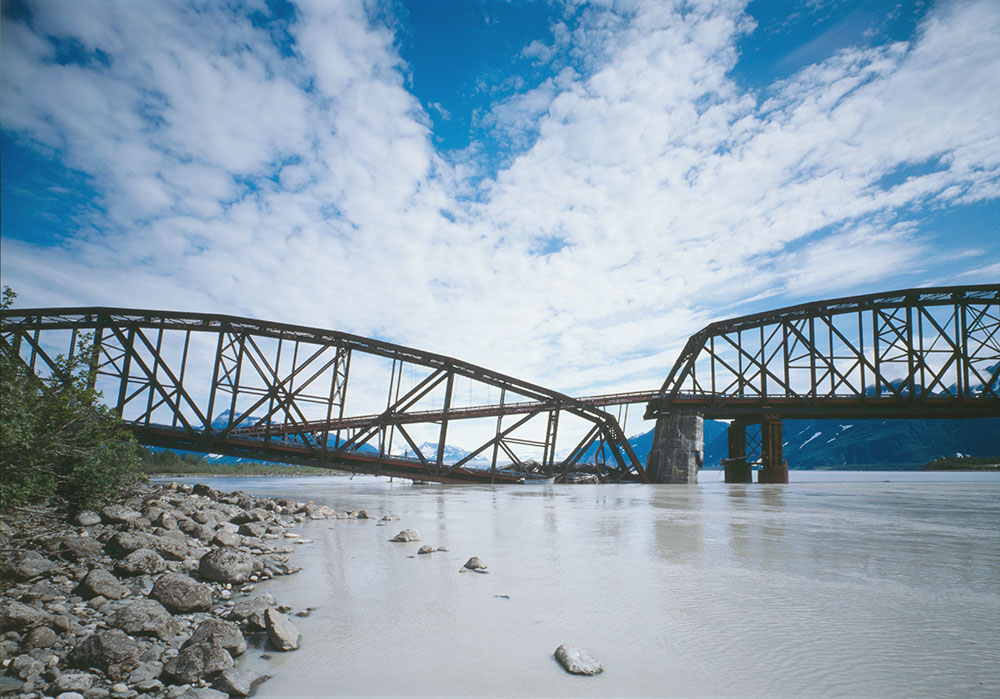
- Damage done by the earthquake, with the temporary fixes performed to make the bridge usable

- Location within Alaska
- Location: Mile 48 of Copper River Highway, about 35 miles (56 km) northeast of Cordova
- Coordinates: 60°40′23″N 144°44′45″W
- Area: less than one acre
- Built: 1910
- Built by: Katalla Corporation; Carnegie Steel Company; American Bridge Company
- Architect: A.C. O'Neel; Erastus Corning Hawkins;
- NRHP reference No.: 00000293
- AHRS No.: COR-00005
- Added to NRHP: March 31, 2000

Location
- Interactive map of Miles Glacier Bridge

The Miles Glacier Bridge, also known as the Million Dollar Bridge, was built in the early 1900s across the Copper River 50 miles (80 km) from Cordova in what is now the U.S. state of Alaska. It is a multiple-span Pennsylvania truss bridge which completed a 196-mile (315 km) railroad line for the Copper River and Northwestern Railway, built by J. P. Morgan and the Guggenheim family to haul copper from the old mining town of Kennicott, now located within the Wrangell–St. Elias National Park and Preserve, to the port of Cordova. It earned its nickname because of its $1.4 million cost, well recouped by the $200 million worth of copper ore shipped as a result of its construction.

Because of erosion along the Copper River Highway, current access to the bridge is limited to jet boat travel up the Copper River or boat travel downriver from Chitina, and there is no access by road. The cost of repairs has prevented necessary maintenance, although the bridge remains an attraction for tourists.

== History ==
The Copper River and Northwestern Railway and its associated bridges were built between 1906 and 1911 by Michael James Heney. This bridge was the most significant of the group. However, its use as a railroad bridge ended in 1938 when the Copper River and Northwestern Railway shut down.

Work to convert the old rail bed into a highway bridge was completed in 1958. In the same year, a plaque was placed on the bridge:

This Bridge once served the Copper River and Northwestern Railroad trains, and was converted to a Highway Bridge in 1958. The Bridge crosses the Copper River between two scenic and active glaciers. The Childs Glacier to the west and the Miles Glacier to the east. Known as the Million Dollar Bridge, and constructed during severe winter conditions. It was considered one of the great engineering feats of all time.

The bridge was among many affected by the 1964 Alaska earthquake – while other bridges along the Copper River Highway from Cordova to Chitina were destroyed, the Million Dollar Bridge was "merely damaged": One of the bridge spans, #4, slipped off its foundation after the earthquake.

The bridge was added to the National Register of Historic Places in 2000.

== Features ==
The bridge at Mile 49 needed to span 1,500 feet (460 m) of the Copper River between two glaciers on either bank. Ice calving from the Miles Glacier meant the bridge needed to withstand icebergs, up to 20 feet (6 m) in height, moving with the swift 7-mile-per-hour (11 km/h) current. Additionally, the river ranged 24 feet (7 m) in height. The bed of the river was loose sand and gravel to a depth of 20 feet (6 m).

The site was selected in 1907 and the bridge would have four spans, #1 at 400 feet (120 m) long, #2 at 300 feet (90 m), #3 at 450 feet (140 m) and #4 at 400 feet, mounted on three piers. The piers would be placed on bars out of the way of most ice. Piers #1 and #2 required detached icebreakers. Excavation of the piers and icebreakers was accomplished through the use of caissons. The track reached the bridge site in October 1908. Actual bridge construction started on 5 April 1909, with span #1 completed in 10½ days, span #2 in 6 days, and span #3 in 10 days; span #4 was completed a month later. The bridge was in full service by July 1910.

== Repairs ==
After the 1964 earthquake, temporary repairs, consisting of a rudimentary system of cables, I-beams, and planks, kept the bridge passable. Permanent repairs were started in 2004, and the repaired bridge was dedicated in August 2005. The controversial decision was made to repair it after a severe September 1995 flood caused the bridge to be impassable and also made an eventual washout of debris onto Childs Glacier inevitable. State engineers determined that it was less expensive to repair the bridge than it would be to remove it, or (in a worst-case scenario) clean up if the bridge completely collapsed into the river. Such a cleanup would have been required due to the Copper River salmon runs. The repairs cost $16 million in federal and $3 million in state tax funding.

In August 2016, a large iceberg struck the icebreaker protecting the bridge’s first pier. The damaged icebreaker, pushed downstream by a high-water event in 2019, now offers no protection to the first pier.

== See also ==
- List of bridges documented by the Historic American Engineering Record in Alaska
- List of bridges on the National Register of Historic Places in Alaska
- National Register of Historic Places listings in Chugach Census Area, Alaska
