= Miles Glacier =

Glacier in Alaska, United States

Coordinates: 60°37′17″N 144°07′08″W

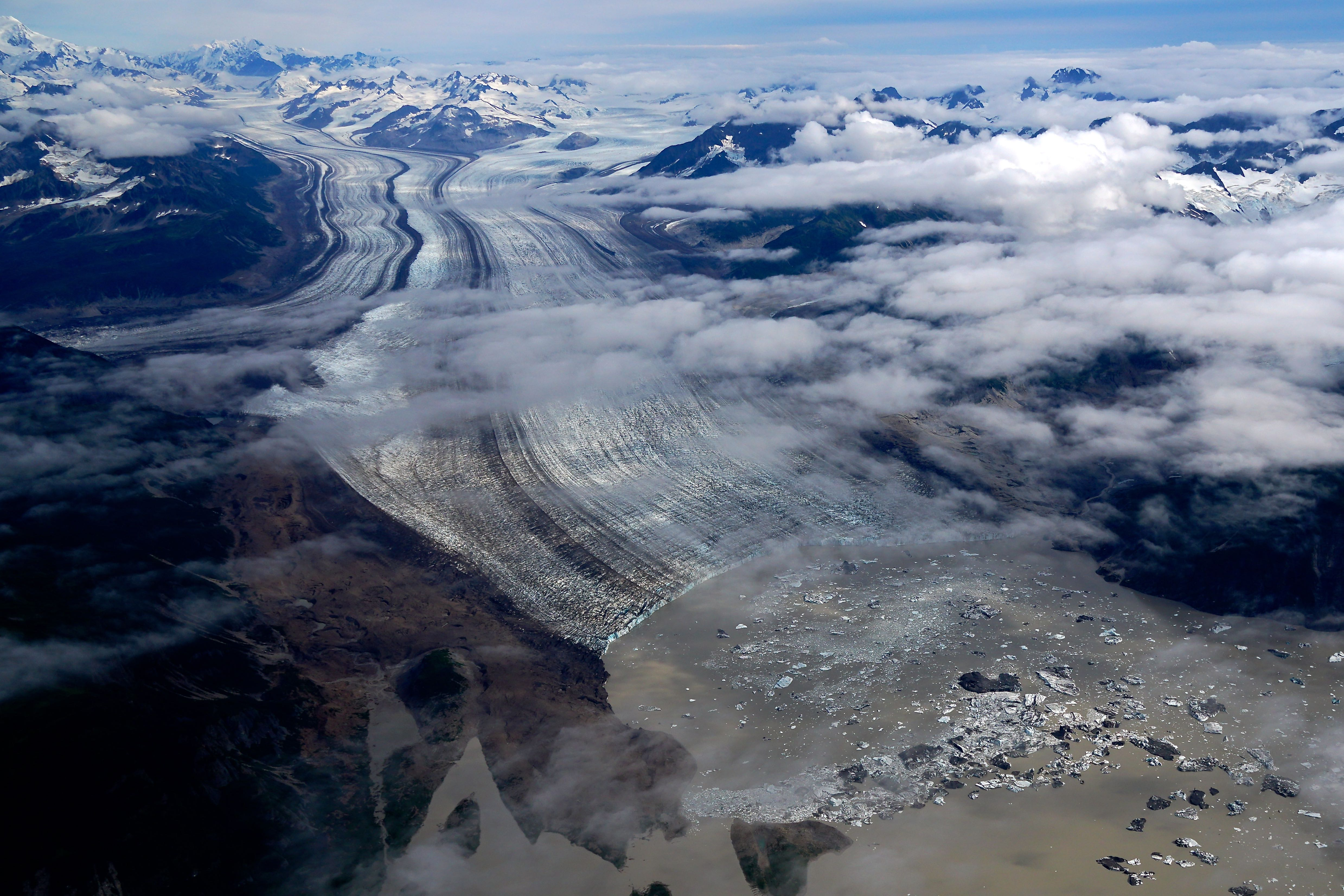
- Miles Glacier terminating into Miles Lake as photographed in August 2018.

- Location within Alaska
- Interactive map of Miles Glacier
- Location: Chugach Census Area, Alaska, U.S.
- Status: Retreating

Miles Glacier is a 30 miles (48 km)-long glacier in the U.S. state of Alaska. It flows west to its terminus at Miles Lake, 33 miles (53 km) north of Katalla. It was named in 1885 after U.S. Army Maj. Gen. Nelson A. Miles by a Lt. Allen during his Alaska expedition.

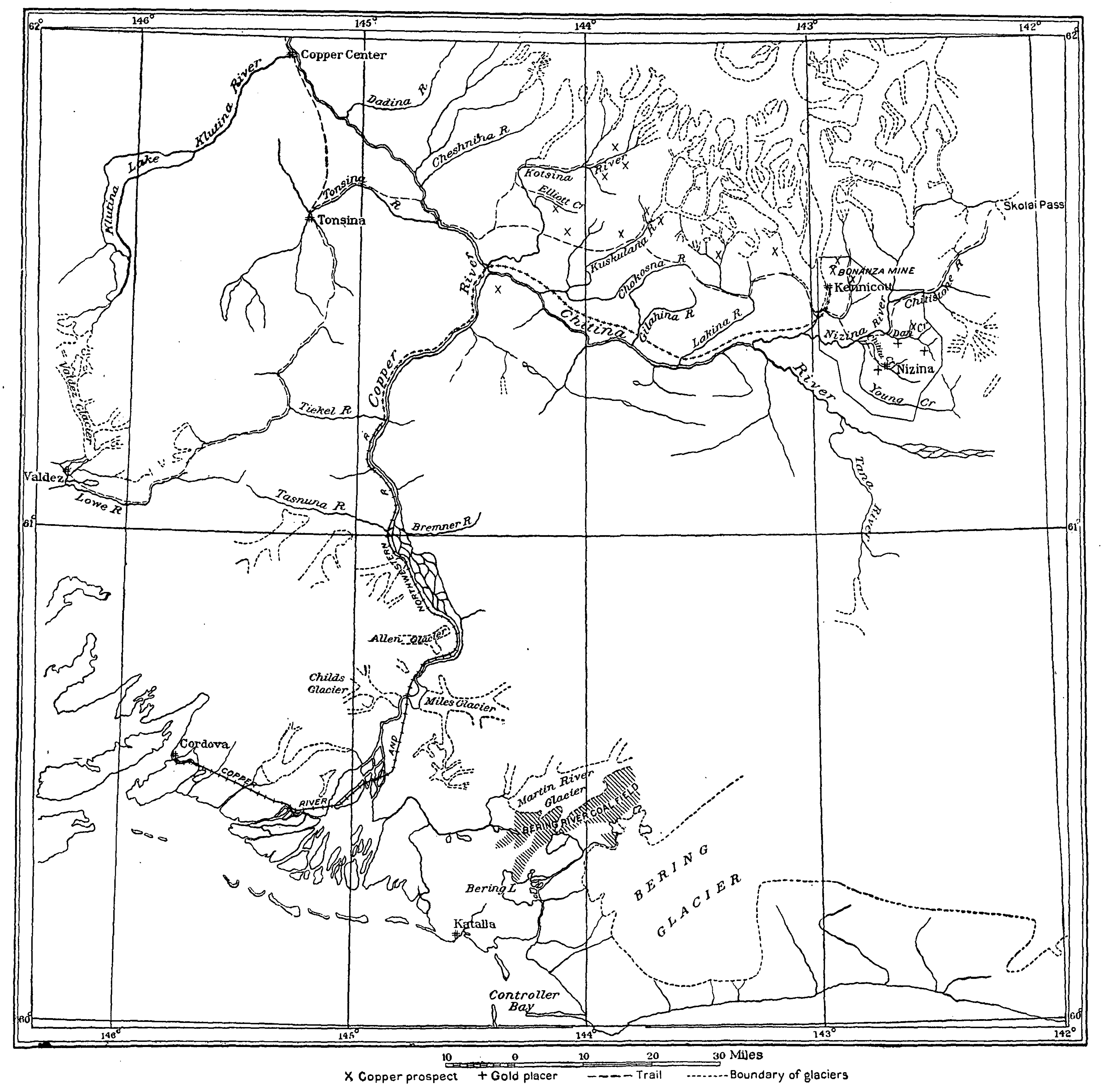
Southern portion Copper River showing the location of Miles Glacier
