= Alaska =

U.S. state

Coordinates: 64°N 152°W

Alaska Alaaskaq (Inupiaq) Alaskaq (Central Yupik) Anáaski (Tlingit) Alas'kaaq (Alutiiq) Аляска (Russian)
- State
- Flag Seal
- Nickname: The Last Frontier
- Motto: North to the Future
- Anthem: Alaska's Flag
- Location of Alaska within the United States
- Country: United States
- Before statehood: Territory of Alaska
- Admitted to the Union: January 3, 1959; 67 years ago (49th)
- Capital: Juneau
- Largest city: Anchorage
- Largest metro and urban areas: Anchorage

Government
  - Governor: Mike Dunleavy (R)
  - Lieutenant Governor: Nancy Dahlstrom (R)
- Legislature: Alaska State Legislature
  - Upper house: State Senate
  - Lower house: House of Representatives
- Judiciary: Alaska Supreme Court
- U.S. senators: Lisa Murkowski (R); Dan Sullivan (R)
- U.S. House delegation: Nick Begich III (R) (list)

Area
  - Total: 665,384 sq mi (1,723,337 km^{2})
  - Land: 586,400 sq mi (1,518,800 km^{2})
  - Water: 91,316 sq mi (236,507 km^{2}) 13.77%
  - Rank: 1st

Dimensions
  - Length: 1,420 mi (2,285 km)
  - Width: 2,261 mi (3,639 km)
- Elevation: 1,900 ft (580 m)
- Highest elevation (Denali): 20,310 ft (6,190.5 m)
- Lowest elevation: 0 ft (0 m)

Population (2025)
  - Total: ▼737,270
  - Rank: 48th
  - Density: 1.1/sq mi (0.42/km^{2})
  - Rank: 50th
  - Median household income: $86,600 (2023)
  - Income rank: 12th
- Demonym: Alaskan

Language
  - Official languages: Ahtna, Alutiiq, Dena'ina, Cup'ig, Deg Xinag, English, Eyak, Gwich'in, Haida, Hän, Holikachuk, Inupiaq, Koyukon, Lower Tanana, Middle Tanana, St. Lawrence Island Yupik, Tanacross, Tlingit, Tsimshian, Unangax̂, Upper Kuskokwim, Upper Tanana, Yup'ik, Wetał
  - Spoken language: English 86.3%; Alaska Native languages 5.2%; Tagalog 3.4%; Spanish 2.9%; Others 2.2%

Time zones
- east of 169°30': UTC−09:00 (AKST)
  - Summer (DST): UTC−08:00 (AKDT)
- west of 169°30': UTC−10:00 (HST)
  - Summer (DST): UTC−09:00 (HDT)
- USPS abbreviation: AK
- ISO 3166 code: US-AK
- Latitude: 51°20'N to 71°50'N
- Longitude: 130°W to 172°E
- Website: alaska.gov

Alaska (/ə.ˈlæs.kə/, ə-LASS-kə) is a U.S. state located in the northwestern regions of North America. Part of the Western United States region, it is one of the two non-contiguous U.S. states, alongside Hawaii. Alaska is considered to be the northernmost, westernmost, and longitudinally, the easternmost state in the United States. (Note: the Aleutian Islands cross the 180th meridian into the eastern hemisphere.) It is a semi-exclave of the U.S, bordering the Canadian territory of Yukon and the province of British Columbia to the east. It shares a western maritime border in the Bering Strait with Russia's Chukotka Autonomous Okrug, and is closer to another continent (Asia) than any other U.S. state. The Chukchi and Beaufort Seas of the Arctic Ocean lie to the north, and the Pacific Ocean to the south.

Alaska is the largest U.S. state by area—comprising more total area than the next three largest states of Texas, California, and Montana combined—and is the world's largest semi-exclave and seventh-largest subnational division. With a population of 740,133 in 2024, it is the third-least populous and most sparsely populated state in the U.S, but the most populous territory in North America located mostly north of the 60th parallel, with more than quadruple the combined populations of Northern Canada and Greenland. Alaska contains the four largest cities in the United States by area, including its capital, Juneau. Alaska's most populous city is Anchorage, and approximately half the state's residents live within its metropolitan area.

Indigenous people have lived in Alaska for thousands of years, and it is widely believed that the region served as the entry point for the initial settlement of the Americas by way of the Bering land bridge. The Russian Empire was the first to actively colonize the area beginning in the 18th century, eventually establishing Russian America, which spanned most of the current state and promoted and maintained a native Alaskan Creole population. The expense and logistical difficulty of maintaining this distant possession prompted its sale to the U.S. in 1867 for US$7.2 million, equivalent to $166 million in 2025. The area went through several administrative changes before becoming organized as a territory on May 11, 1912. It was admitted as the 49th state of the U.S. on January 3, 1959.

An abundance of natural resources—including commercial fishing and the extraction of natural gas and oil—has enabled Alaska to have one of the highest per capita incomes in the United States, despite having one of the smallest economies. U.S. Armed Forces bases and tourism also contribute to the economy; more than half of Alaska is federally owned, containing national forests, national parks, and wildlife refuges. It is among the most irreligious states and one of the first to legalize recreational marijuana. Alaska has the highest proportion of Native Americans of any U.S. state, at 22 percent.

== Etymology ==
The name Alaska (Russian: Аля́ска, romanized: Alyaska) was introduced during the Russian colonial period when it was used to refer to the Alaska Peninsula. It was derived from an Aleut-language idiom, alaxsxaq, meaning 'the mainland' or, more literally, 'the object towards which the action of the sea is directed'.

State symbols of Alaska
List of state symbols
- Flag of Alaska

- Seal of Alaska
- Motto: North to the future
- Song: Alaska's Flag

Living insignia
- Bird: willow ptarmigan
- Dog breed: Alaskan Malamute
- Fish: King salmon
- Insect: Four-spot skimmer dragonfly
- Mammal: Land: Moose Marine: Bowhead whale

Inanimate insignia
- Firearm: Winchester Model 70
- Fossil: Woolly Mammoth
- Gemstone: Jade
- Mineral: Gold
- Sport: Dog sledding

State quarter
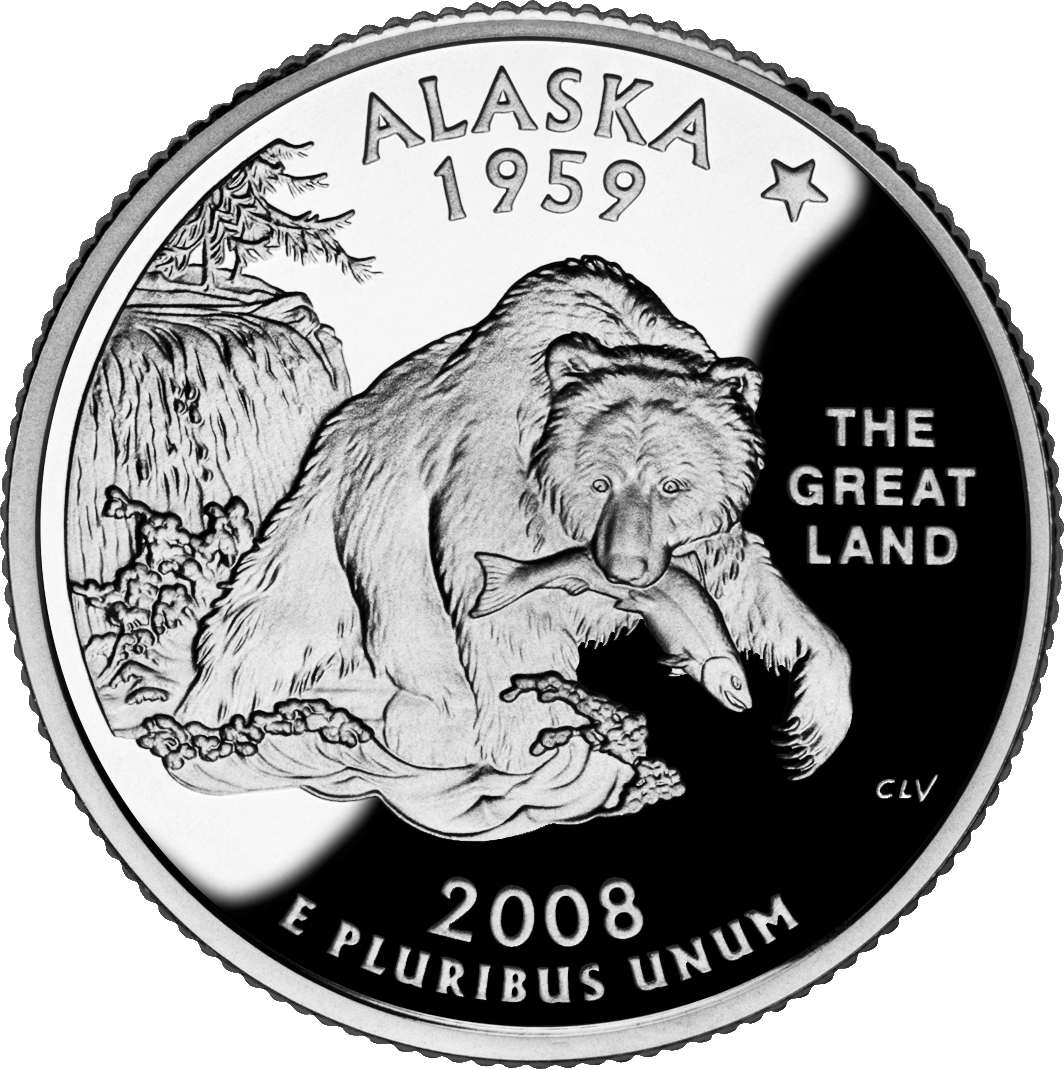

== History ==
=== Pre-colonization ===
Numerous Indigenous peoples occupied Alaska for thousands of years before the arrival of European peoples to the area. Linguistic and DNA studies done here have provided evidence for the settlement of North America by way of the Bering land bridge. At the Upward Sun River site in the Tanana Valley in Alaska, remains of a six-week-old infant were found. The baby's DNA showed that she belonged to a population that was genetically separate from other Native groups present elsewhere in the New World at the end of the Pleistocene. Ben Potter, the University of Alaska Fairbanks archaeologist who unearthed the remains at the Upward Sun River site in 2013, named this new group Ancient Beringian.

The Tlingit people developed a society with a matrilineal kinship system of property inheritance and descent in what is present Southeast Alaska, along with parts of British Columbia and the Yukon. Also in the Southeast were the Haida, now well known for their unique arts. The Tsimshian people came to Alaska from British Columbia in 1887, when President Grover Cleveland, and later the U.S. Congress, granted them permission to settle on Annette Island and found the town of Metlakatla, Alaska. All three of these peoples, as well as other Indigenous peoples of the Pacific Northwest Coast, experienced smallpox outbreaks from the late 18th through the mid-19th century, with the most devastating epidemics occurring in the 1830s and 1860s, resulting in high fatalities and social disruption.

=== Colonization ===
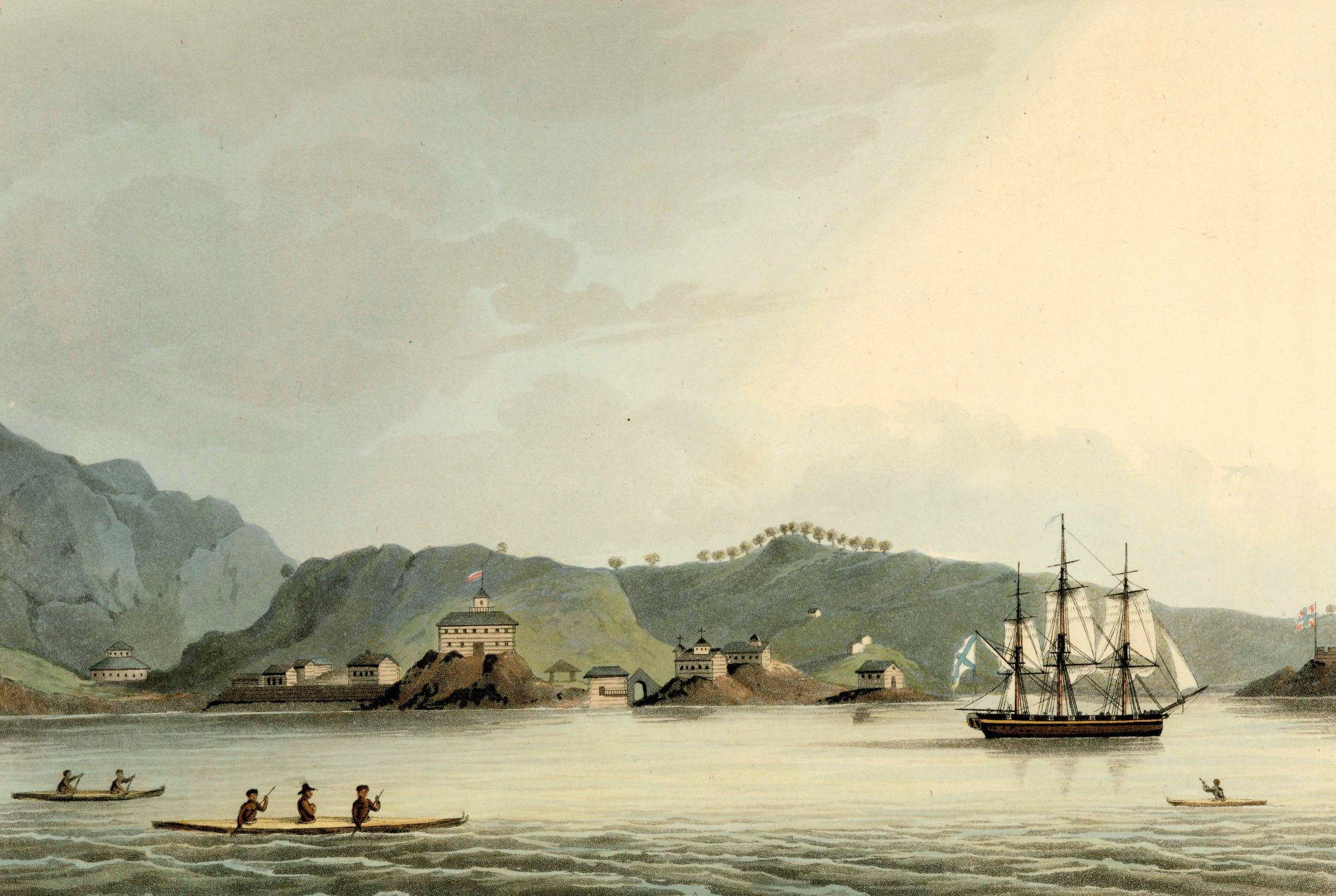
The Russian settlement of St. Paul's Harbor, present-day Kodiak town, Kodiak Island, 1814

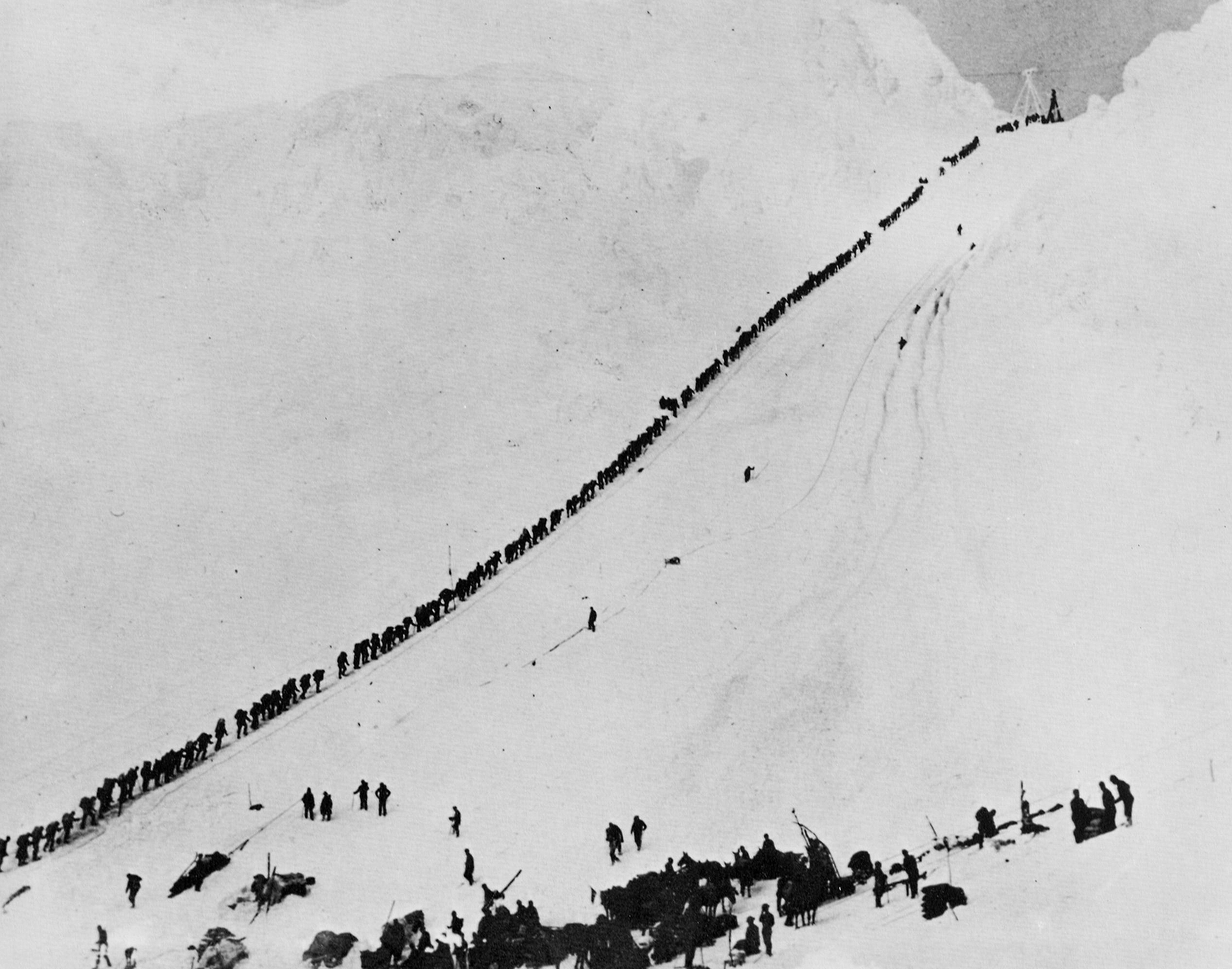
Miners and prospectors climb the Chilkoot Trail during the 1898 Klondike Gold Rush.

Some researchers believe the first Russian settlement in Alaska was established in the 17th century. According to this hypothesis, in 1648 several koches of Semyon Dezhnyov's expedition came ashore in Alaska by storm and founded this settlement. This hypothesis is based on the testimony of Chukchi geographer Nikolai Daurkin, who had visited Alaska in 1764–1765 and who had reported on a village on the Kheuveren River, populated by "bearded men" who "pray to the icons". Some modern researchers associate the Kheuveren with the Koyuk River.

The first European vessel to reach Alaska is generally held to be the St. Gabriel under the authority of the surveyor M. S. Gvozdev and assistant navigator I. Fyodorov on August 21, 1732, during an expedition of Siberian Cossack A. F. Shestakov and Russian explorer Dmitry Pavlutsky (1729–1735). Another European contact with Alaska occurred in 1741, when Vitus Bering led an expedition for the Russian Navy aboard the St. Peter. After his crew returned to Russia with sea otter pelts judged to be the finest fur in the world, small associations of fur traders began to sail from the shores of Siberia toward the Aleutian Islands. The first permanent European settlement was founded in 1784.

From 1774 to 1800, Spain sent several expeditions to Alaska to assert its claim over the Pacific Northwest, which it considered part of New Spain, administered from Mexico City, Mexico. In 1789, a Spanish settlement and fort were built in Nootka Sound. These expeditions gave names to places such as Valdez, Bucareli Sound, and Cordova. Later, the Russian-American Company carried out an expanded colonization program during the early-to-mid-19th century. Sitka, renamed New Archangel from 1804 to 1867, on Baranof Island in the Alexander Archipelago in what is now Southeast Alaska, became the capital of Russian America. It remained the capital after the colony was transferred to the United States. The Russians never fully colonized Alaska, and the colony was never very profitable. Evidence of Russian settlement in names and churches survives throughout southeastern Alaska.

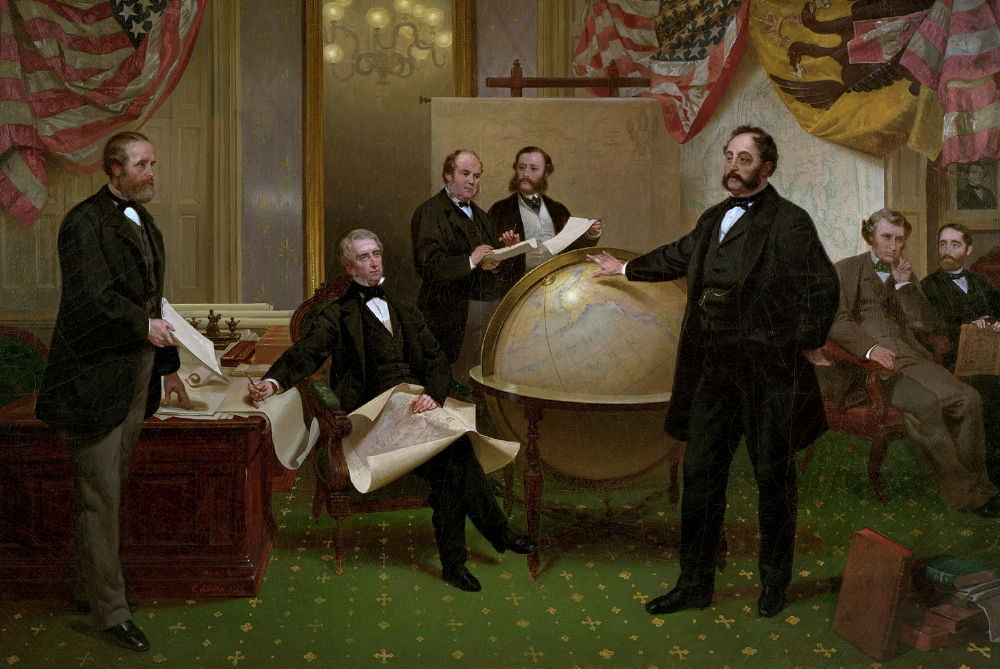
Signing of the Alaska Treaty (1867)

In 1867, William H. Seward, the United States Secretary of State under President Andrew Johnson, negotiated the Alaska Purchase, referred to pejoratively as Seward's Folly, with the Russians for $7.2 million. Russian emperor Alexander II also planned the sale. The purchase was made on March 30, 1867. Six months later the commissioners arrived in Sitka and the formal transfer was arranged. The flag-raising took place at Fort Sitka on October 18, 1867. In the ceremony, 250 uniformed U.S. soldiers marched to the governor's house at "Castle Hill", where the Russian troops lowered the Russian flag and the U.S. flag was raised. This event is celebrated as Alaska Day, a legal holiday on October 18.

Alaska was loosely governed by the military initially and was administered as a district starting in 1884, with a governor appointed by the United States president. A federal district court was headquartered in Sitka. For most of Alaska's first decade under the United States flag, Sitka was the only community inhabited by American settlers. They organized "a provisional city government", which was Alaska's first municipal government, but not in a legal sense. Legislation allowing Alaskan communities to legally incorporate as cities arrived in 1900, and home rule for cities was extremely limited or unavailable until statehood took effect in 1959.

=== U.S. territorial incorporation ===
Starting in the 1890s and stretching in some places to the early 1910s, gold rushes in Alaska and the nearby Yukon Territory brought thousands of miners and settlers to Alaska. From 1879 to 1920, Alaska produced a cumulative total of over $460 million (equivalent to $7.4 billion in 2025), of mineral production. In 1912, Alaska was incorporated as an organized territory. Alaska's capital, which had been in Sitka until 1906, was moved north to Juneau. Construction of the Alaska Governor's Mansion began that same year. European immigrants from Norway and Sweden also settled in southeast Alaska, where they entered the fishing and logging industries.

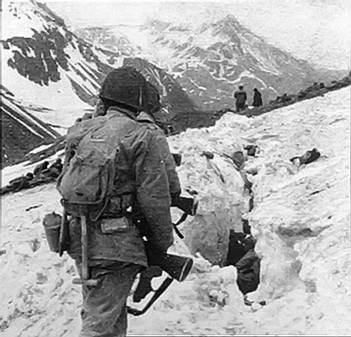
U.S. troops navigate snow and ice during the Battle of Attu in May 1943.

During World War II, the Aleutian Islands Campaign focused on Attu, Agattu and Kiska, all of which were occupied by the Empire of Japan. (Note: These three Aleutian outer islands are about 460 miles (740 km) away from mainland USSR, 920 miles (1,480 km) from mainland Alaska, 950 miles (1,530 km) from Japan.) During the Japanese occupation, an American civilian and two United States Navy personnel were killed at Attu and Kiska respectively, and almost 50 Aleut civilians and eight sailors were interned in Japan. About half of the Aleuts died during the period of internment. Unalaska/Dutch Harbor and Adak became significant bases for the United States Army, United States Army Air Forces and United States Navy. The United States Lend-Lease program involved flying American warplanes through Canada to Fairbanks and then Nome. Soviet pilots took possession of these aircraft, ferrying them to fight the German invasion of the Soviet Union. The construction of military bases contributed to the population growth of some Alaskan cities.

=== Statehood ===
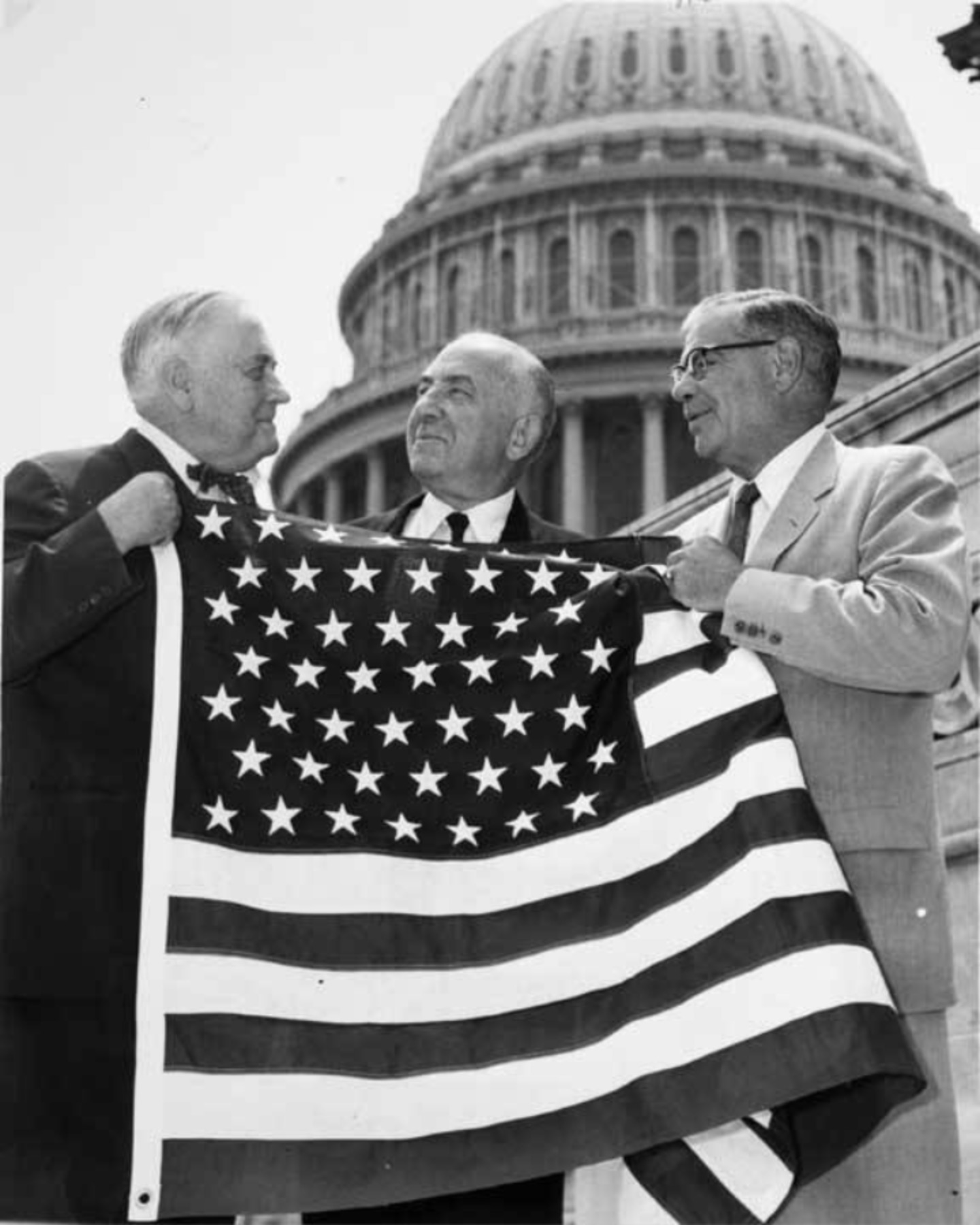
Bob Bartlett and Ernest Gruening, Alaska's inaugural U.S. Senators, hold the 49-star U.S. Flag after the admission of Alaska as the 49th state.

Statehood for Alaska was an important cause of James Wickersham early in his tenure as a congressional delegate. Decades later, the statehood movement gained its first real momentum following a territorial referendum in 1946. The Alaska Statehood Committee and Alaska's Constitutional Convention soon followed. Statehood supporters also found themselves fighting major battles against political foes, mostly in the U.S. Congress but also within Alaska. Statehood was approved by the U.S. Congress on July 7, 1958. Alaska was officially proclaimed a state on January 3, 1959.

=== Good Friday earthquake ===
On March 27, 1964, the Good Friday earthquake killed 133 people and destroyed several villages and portions of large coastal communities, mainly by the resultant tsunamis and landslides. It was the fourth-most-powerful earthquake in recorded history, with a moment magnitude of 9.2, more than a thousand times as powerful as the 1989 San Francisco earthquake. The time of day (5:36 pm), time of year (spring) and location of the epicenter were all cited as factors in potentially sparing thousands of lives, particularly in Anchorage.

The Good Friday earthquake lasted 4 minutes and 38 seconds. Six hundred miles (970 km) of fault ruptured at once and moved up to 60 ft (18 m), releasing about 500 years of stress buildup. Soil liquefaction, fissures, landslides, and other ground failures caused major structural damage in several communities and much damage to property. Anchorage sustained great destruction or damage to many inadequately earthquake-engineered houses, buildings, and infrastructure (paved streets, sidewalks, water and sewer mains, electrical systems, and other human-made equipment), particularly in the several landslide zones along Knik Arm. Two hundred miles (320 km) southwest, some areas near Kodiak were permanently raised by 30 feet (9 m). Southeast of Anchorage, areas around the head of Turnagain Arm near Girdwood and Portage dropped as much as 8 feet (2.4 m), requiring reconstruction and fill to raise the Seward Highway above the new high tide mark.

In Prince William Sound, Port Valdez suffered a massive underwater landslide, resulting in the deaths of 32 people between the collapse of the Valdez city harbor and docks, and inside the ship that was docked there at the time. Nearby, a 27-foot (8.2 m) tsunami destroyed the village of Chenega, killing 23 of the 68 people who lived there; survivors out-ran the wave, climbing to high ground. Post-quake tsunamis severely affected Whittier, Seward, Kodiak, and other Alaskan communities, as well as people and property in British Columbia, Washington, Oregon, and California. Tsunamis also caused damage in Hawaii and Japan. Evidence of motion directly related to the earthquake was also reported from Florida and Texas.

Alaska had never experienced a major disaster in a highly populated area before and had very limited resources for dealing with the effects of such an event. In Anchorage, at the urging of geologist Lidia Selkregg, the City of Anchorage and the Alaska State Housing Authority appointed a team of 40 scientists, including geologists, soil scientists, and engineers, to assess the damage done by the earthquake to the city. The team, called the Engineering and Geological Evaluation Group, was headed by Ruth A. M. Schmidt, a geology professor at the University of Alaska Anchorage. The team of scientists came into conflict with local developers and downtown business owners who wanted to immediately rebuild; the scientists wanted to identify future dangers to ensure that the rebuilt infrastructure would be safe. The team produced a report on May 8, 1964, just a little more than a month after the earthquake.

The United States military, which has a large active presence in Alaska, also stepped in to assist within moments of the end of the quake. The U.S. Army rapidly re-established communications with the lower 48 states, deployed troops to assist the citizens of Anchorage, and dispatched a convoy to Valdez. On the advice of military and civilian leaders, President Lyndon B. Johnson declared all of Alaska a major disaster area the day after the quake. The U.S. Navy and U.S. Coast Guard deployed ships to isolated coastal communities to assist with immediate needs. Bad weather and poor visibility hampered air rescue and observation efforts the day after the quake, but on Sunday the 29th the situation improved and rescue helicopters and observation aircraft were deployed. A military airlift immediately began shipping relief supplies to Alaska, eventually delivering 2,570,000 pounds (1,170,000 kg) of food and other supplies.

Broadcast journalist, Genie Chance, assisted in recovery and relief efforts, staying on the KENI air waves over Anchorage for more than 24 continuous hours as the voice of calm from her temporary post within the Anchorage Public Safety Building. She was effectively designated as the public safety officer by the city's police chief. Chance provided breaking news of the catastrophic events that continued to develop following the magnitude 9.2 earthquake, and she served as the voice of the public safety office, coordinating response efforts, connecting available resources to needs around the community, disseminating information about shelters and prepared food rations, passing messages of well-being between loved ones, and helping to reunite families.

In the longer term, the U.S. Army Corps of Engineers led the effort to rebuild roads, clear debris, and establish new townsites for communities that had been completely destroyed, at a cost of $110 million. The West Coast and Alaska Tsunami Warning Center was formed as a direct response to the disaster. Federal disaster relief funds paid for reconstruction as well as financially supporting the devastated infrastructure of Alaska's government, spending hundreds of millions of dollars that helped keep Alaska financially solvent until the discovery of massive oil deposits at Prudhoe Bay. At the order of the U.S. Defense Department, the Alaska National Guard founded the Alaska Division of Emergency Services to respond to any future disasters.

=== Oil boom ===
The 1968 discovery of oil at Prudhoe Bay and the 1977 completion of the Trans-Alaska Pipeline System led to an oil boom. Royalty revenues from oil have funded large state budgets from 1980 onward.

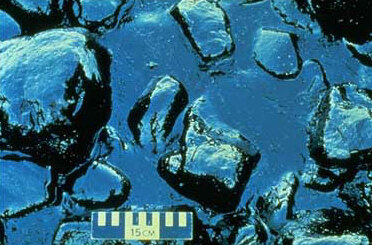
Oil pooled on rocks on the shore of Prince William Sound after the 1989 Exxon Valdez oil spill.

Oil production was not the only economic value of Alaska's land. In the second half of the 20th century, Alaska discovered tourism as an important source of revenue. Tourism became popular after World War II when military personnel stationed in the region returned home praising its natural splendor. The Alcan Highway, built during the war, and the Alaska Marine Highway System, completed in 1963, made the state more accessible than before. Tourism has become increasingly important in Alaska, and today more than 1.4 million people visit the state each year.

With tourism more vital to the economy, environmentalism rose in importance. The Alaska National Interest Lands Conservation Act (ANILCA) of 1980 added 53.7 million acres (217,000 km^{2}) to the National Wildlife Refuge system, parts of 25 rivers to the National Wild and Scenic Rivers System, 3.3 million acres (13,000 km^{2}) to National Forest lands, and 43.6 million acres (176,000 km^{2}) to National Park land. Because of the Act, Alaska now contains two-thirds of all American national parklands. Today, more than half of Alaskan land is owned by the Federal Government.

In 1989, the Exxon Valdez hit a reef in the Prince William Sound, spilling more than 11 million gallons (42 megalitres) of crude oil over 1,100 miles (1,800 km) of coastline. Today, the battle between philosophies of development and conservation is seen in the contentious debate over oil drilling in the Arctic National Wildlife Refuge and the proposed Pebble Mine.

== Geography ==
Alaska municipalities

Located at the northwest corner of North America very near to Asia, Alaska is the northernmost and westernmost state in the United States, but also has the most easterly longitude in the United States because the Aleutian Islands extend into the Eastern Hemisphere. Alaska is the only non-contiguous U.S. state on continental North America; about 500 miles (800 km) of Canadian territory consisting of British Columbia (in Canada) separates Alaska from Washington. It is technically part of the continental U.S., but is not usually included in the colloquial use of the term; Alaska is not part of the contiguous U.S., often called "the Lower 48". The capital city, Juneau, is situated on the mainland of the North American continent but is not connected by road to the rest of the North American highway system. The largest lake in Alaska is Lake Illiamna.

Alaska is bordered by Canada's Yukon and British Columbia to the east (making it the only state to border only a Canadian territory); the Gulf of Alaska and the Pacific Ocean to the south and southwest; the Bering Sea, Bering Strait, and Chukchi Sea to the west; and the Arctic Ocean to the north. Alaska's territorial waters touch Russia's territorial waters in the Bering Strait, as the Russian Big Diomede Island and Alaskan Little Diomede Island are only 3 miles (4.8 km) apart. Alaska has a longer coastline than all the other U.S. states combined.

Alaska's size compared with the contiguous states (Albers equal-area conic projection)

At 663,268 square miles (1,717,856 km^{2}) in total area, Alaska is by far the largest state in the United States. Alaska is more than twice the size of the second-largest U.S. state (Texas), and it is larger than the next three largest states (Texas, California, and Montana) combined. Alaska is the seventh largest subnational division in the world. If it was an independent nation, it would be the 18th largest country in the world; almost the same size as Iran.

With its myriad islands, Alaska has nearly 34,000 miles (55,000 km) of tidal shoreline. The Aleutian Islands chain extends west from the southern tip of the Alaska Peninsula. Many active volcanoes are found in the Aleutians and in coastal regions. Unimak Island, for example, is home to Mount Shishaldin, which is an occasionally smoldering volcano that rises to 10,000 feet (3,000 m) above the North Pacific. The chain of volcanoes extends to Mount Spurr, west of Anchorage on the mainland. Geologists have identified Alaska as part of Wrangellia, a large region consisting of multiple states and Canadian provinces in the Pacific Northwest, which is actively undergoing continent building.

One of the world's largest tides occurs in Turnagain Arm, just south of Anchorage, where tidal differences can be more than 35 feet (10.7 m).

Alaska has more than 409,000 natural lakes at least one hectare or bigger. Marshlands and wetland permafrost cover 188,320 square miles (487,700 km^{2}) (mostly in northern, western and southwest flatlands). Glacier ice covers about 28,957 square miles (75,000 km^{2}) of Alaska. The Bering Glacier is the largest glacier in North America, covering 2,008 square miles (5,200 km^{2}) alone.

=== Regions ===
==== Southcentral ====
The most populous region of Alaska contains Anchorage, the Matanuska-Susitna Valley and the Kenai Peninsula. Rural, mostly unpopulated areas south of the Alaska Range and west of the Wrangell Mountains also fall within the definition of South Central, as do the Prince William Sound area and the communities of Cordova and Valdez.

==== Southeast ====
Also referred to as the Panhandle or Inside Passage, this is the region of Alaska closest to the contiguous states. As such, this was where most of the initial non-indigenous settlement occurred in the years following the Alaska Purchase. The region is dominated by the Alexander Archipelago as well as the Tongass National Forest, the largest national forest in the United States. It contains the state capital Juneau, the former capital Sitka, and Ketchikan, at one time Alaska's largest city. The Alaska Marine Highway provides a vital surface transportation link throughout the area and country, as only three communities (Haines, Hyder and Skagway) enjoy direct connections to the contiguous North American road system.

==== Interior ====
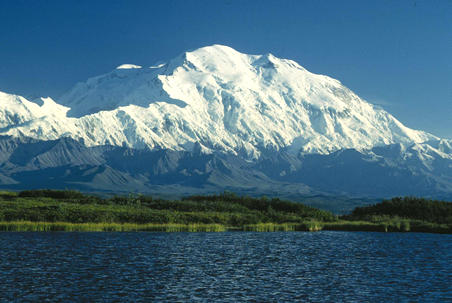
Denali is the highest peak in North America.

The Interior is the largest region of Alaska; much of it is uninhabited wilderness. Fairbanks is the only large city in the region. Denali National Park and Preserve is located here. Denali, federally designated as Mount McKinley, is the highest mountain in North America and is also located here.

==== North Slope ====
The North Slope is mostly tundra peppered with small villages. The area is known for its massive reserves of crude oil and contains both the National Petroleum Reserve–Alaska and the Prudhoe Bay Oil Field. The city of Utqiaġvik, formerly known as Barrow, is the northernmost city in the United States and is located here. The Northwest Arctic area, anchored by Kotzebue and also containing the Kobuk River valley, is often considered part of this region. The respective Inupiat of the North Slope and of the Northwest Arctic seldom consider themselves to be one people.

==== Southwest ====
Southwest Alaska is a sparsely inhabited region stretching some 500 miles (800 km) inland from the Bering Sea. Most of the population lives along the coast. Kodiak Island is also located in the Southwest. The massive Yukon–Kuskokwim Delta, one of the largest river deltas in the world, is here. Portions of the Alaska Peninsula are considered part of the Southwest, with the Aleutian Islands often (but not always) being grouped in as well.

==== Aleutian Islands ====
Although entirely east of the International Date Line (the triangular kink in the line was agreed upon the U.S. acquisition of Alaska), the Aleutian Islands cross the 180th meridian, such that they contain both the westernmost (Amatignak) and the easternmost (Semisopochnoi.) points in the United States.

While primarily part of Southwest Alaska when grouped economically, the Aleutian islands are sometimes recognized as an alternate group from the rest of the region due to the geographic separation from the continent. More than 300 small volcanic islands make up this chain, which stretches more than 1,200 miles (1,900 km) into the Pacific Ocean. Some of these islands fall in the Eastern Hemisphere, but the International Date Line was drawn west of 180° to keep the whole state, and thus the entire North American continent, within the same legal day. Two of the islands, Attu and Kiska, were occupied by Japanese forces during World War II.

=== Land ownership ===
As of 2023 the United States Bureau of Land Management manages 290 million surface and subsurface acres as public lands, including a multitude of national forests, national parks, national wildlife refuges, and federal mineral estate land. Of these, the Bureau of Land Management manages 87 million acres (35 million hectares), or 23.8% of the state. The Arctic National Wildlife Refuge is managed by the United States Fish and Wildlife Service. It is the world's largest wildlife refuge, comprising 16 million acres (6.5 million hectares).

Of the remaining land area, the state of Alaska owns 101 million acres (41 million hectares), its entitlement under the Alaska Statehood Act. A portion of that acreage is occasionally ceded to the organized boroughs presented above, under the statutory provisions pertaining to newly formed boroughs. Smaller portions are set aside for rural subdivisions and other homesteading-related opportunities. These are not very popular due to the often remote and roadless locations. The University of Alaska, as a land grant university, also owns substantial acreage which it manages independently.

Another 44 million acres (18 million hectares) are owned by 12 regional, and scores of local, Native corporations created under the Alaska Native Claims Settlement Act (ANCSA) of 1971. Regional Native corporation Doyon, Limited often promotes itself as the largest private landowner in Alaska in advertisements and other communications. Provisions of ANCSA allowing the corporations' land holdings to be sold on the open market starting in 1991 were repealed before they could take effect. Effectively, the corporations hold title (including subsurface title in many cases, a privilege denied to individual Alaskans) but cannot sell the land. Individual Native allotments are sold on the open market.

Various private interests own the remaining land, totaling about one percent of the state. Alaska is, by a large margin, the state with the smallest percentage of private land ownership when Native corporation holdings are excluded.

=== Alaska Heritage Resources Survey ===
The Alaska Heritage Resources Survey (AHRS) is a restricted inventory of all reported historic and prehistoric sites within the U.S. state of Alaska; it is maintained by the Office of History and Archaeology. The survey's inventory of cultural resources includes objects, structures, buildings, sites, districts, and travel ways, with a general provision that they are more than fifty years old. As of 31 January 2012, more than 35,000 sites have been reported.

=== Cities, towns and boroughs ===
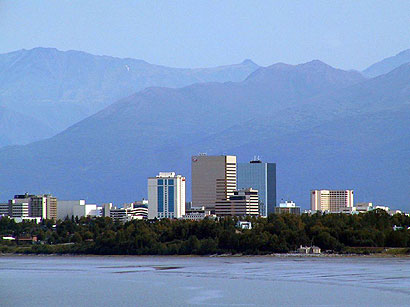
Anchorage is Alaska's largest city.

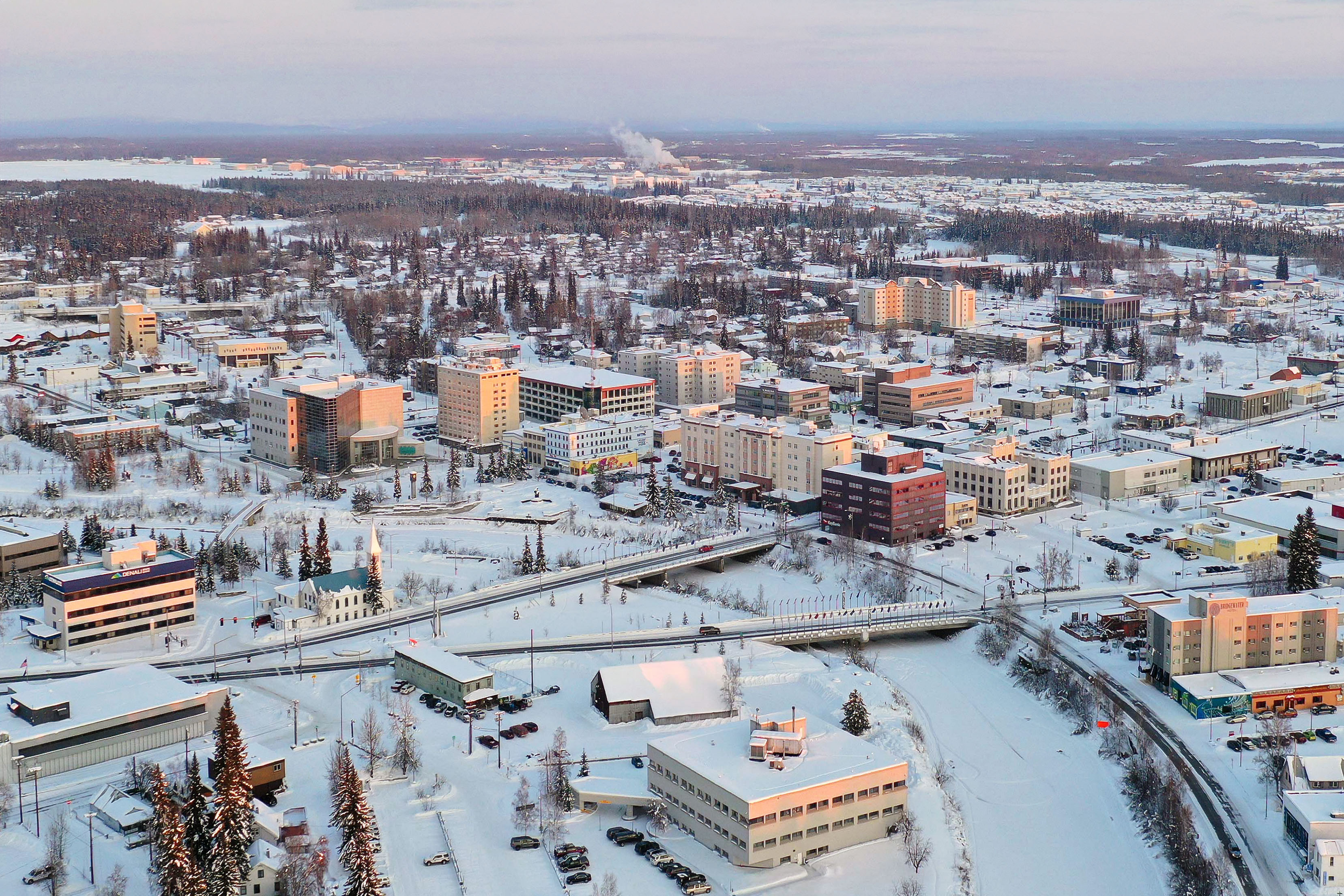
Fairbanks, Alaska's second-largest city and by a significant margin the largest city in Alaska's interior

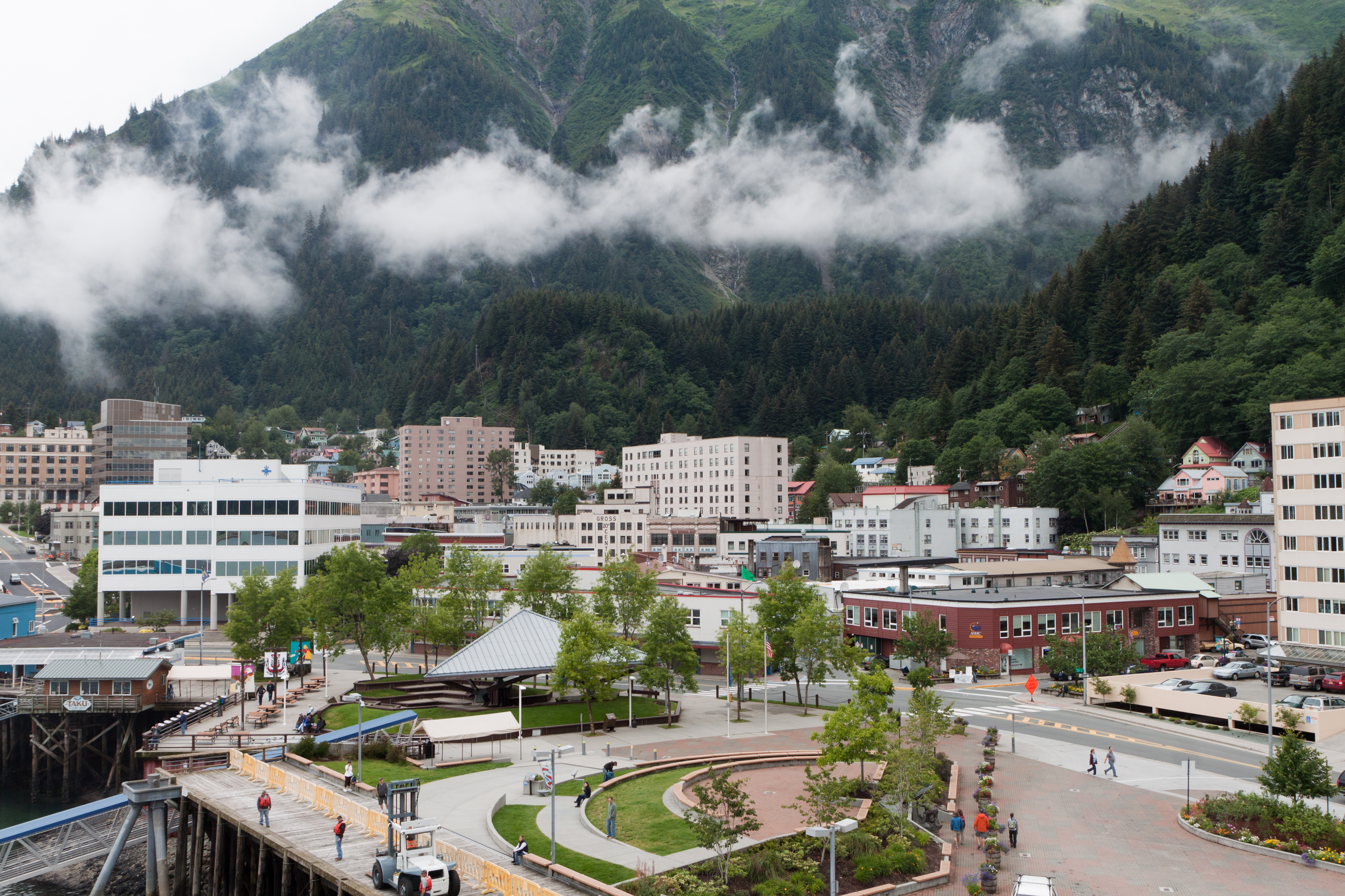
Juneau, Alaska's third-largest city and its capital

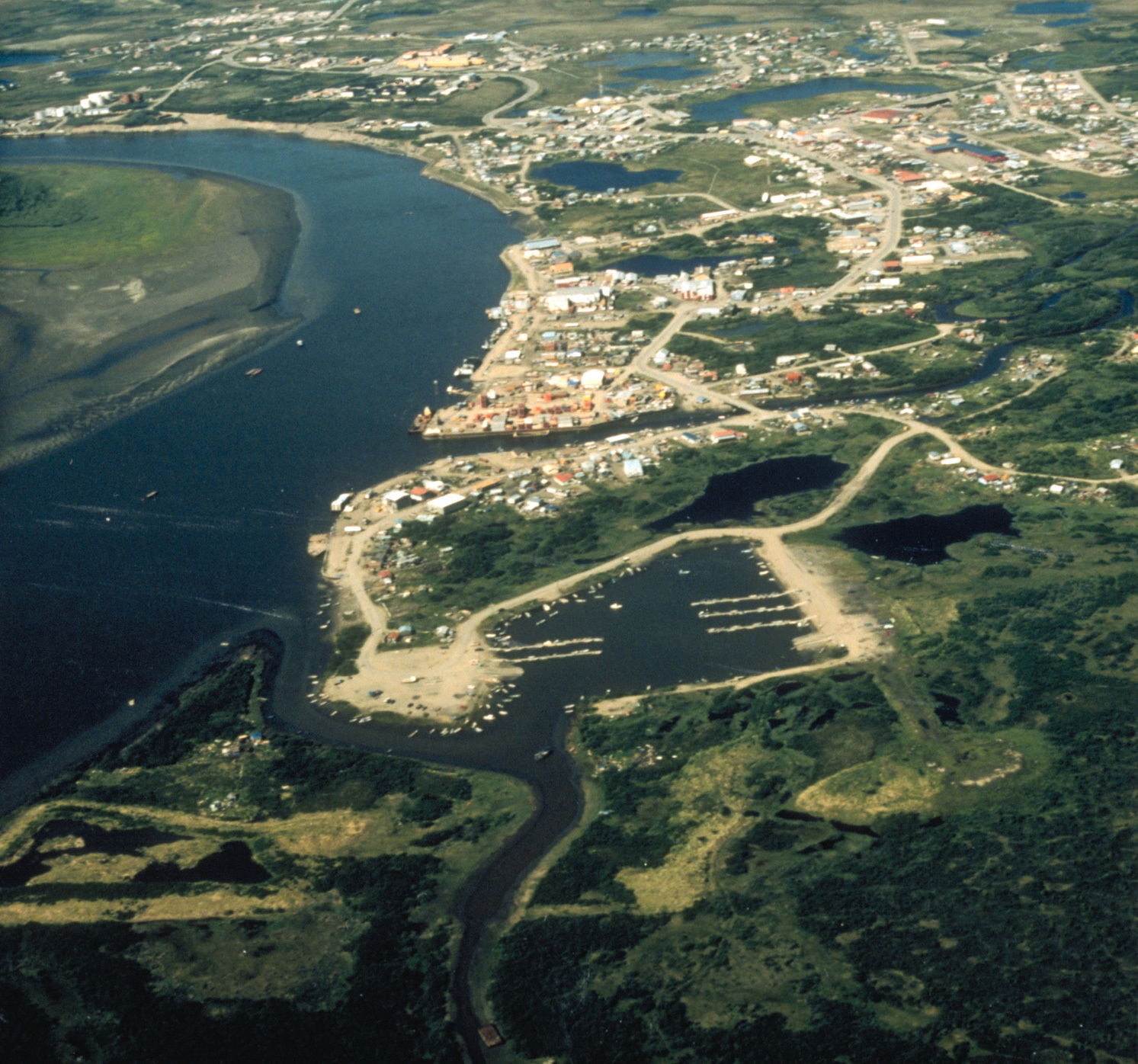
Bethel, the largest city in the Unorganized Borough and in rural Alaska

Unlike most U.S. states, Alaska is not divided into counties, but rather into boroughs. Delegates to the Alaska Constitutional Convention wanted to avoid the pitfalls of the traditional county system and adopted their own unique model. Many of the more densely populated parts of the state are part of Alaska's 16 boroughs, which function somewhat similarly to counties in other states. Unlike county-equivalents in the other states, the boroughs do not cover the state's entire land area. The area not part of any borough is referred to as the Unorganized Borough.

The Unorganized Borough has no government of its own, but the U.S. Census Bureau in cooperation with the state divided the Unorganized Borough into 11 census areas solely for the purposes of statistical analysis and presentation. A recording district is a mechanism for management of the public record in Alaska. The state is divided into 34 recording districts which are centrally administered under a state recorder. All recording districts use the same acceptance criteria, fee schedule, etc., for accepting documents into the public record.

Whereas many U.S. states use a three-tiered system of decentralization—state/county/township—most of Alaska uses two tiers—state/borough. Owing to the low population density, most of the land is located in the Unorganized Borough. As the name implies, it has no intermediate borough government but is administered directly by the state government. In 2000, 57.71% of Alaska's area has this status, with 13.05% of the population.

In 1975, Anchorage merged the city government with the Greater Anchorage Area Borough to form the Municipality of Anchorage, containing the city proper and the communities of Eagle River, Chugiak, Peters Creek, Girdwood, Bird, and Indian. Fairbanks has a separate borough (the Fairbanks North Star Borough) and municipality (the City of Fairbanks).

Alaska's most populous city is Anchorage, home to 291,247 people in 2020. The richest location in Alaska by per capita income is Denali ($42,245). Yakutat, Sitka, Juneau, and Anchorage are the four largest cities in the U.S. by area.

==== Cities and census-designated places (by population) ====
In the 2020 United States census, Alaska has 355 incorporated cities and census-designated places (CDPs). The tally of cities includes four unified municipalities, essentially the equivalent of a consolidated city–county. The majority of these communities are located in the rural expanse of Alaska known as "The Bush" and are unconnected to the contiguous North American road network. The table at the bottom of this section lists the 100 largest cities and census-designated places in Alaska, in population order.

Of Alaska's 2020 U.S. census population figure of 733,391, 16,655 people, or 2.27% of the population, did not live in an incorporated city or census-designated place. Approximately three-quarters of that figure were people who live in urban and suburban neighborhoods on the outskirts of the city limits of Ketchikan, Kodiak, Palmer and Wasilla. CDPs have not been established for these areas by the United States Census Bureau. Seven CDPs were established for the Ketchikan-area neighborhoods in the 1980 census (Clover Pass, Herring Cove, Ketchikan East, Mountain Point, Alaska Route 7, Pennock Island and Saxman East), but have not been used since. The remaining population was scattered throughout Alaska, both within organized boroughs and in the Unorganized Borough, in largely remote areas.

Largest cities and CDPs in Alaska 2020 United States Census
Rank	Name	Borough	Pop.	Rank	Name	Borough	Pop.
1	Anchorage	Matanuska-Susitna	291,247	11	Kalifornsky	Kenai Peninsula	8,487
2	Fairbanks	Fairbanks North Star	32,515	12	Sitka	Consolidated city-borough	8,458
3	Juneau	Consolidated city-borough	32,255	13	Ketchikan	Ketchikan Gateway	8,192
4	Knik-Fairview	Matanuska-Susitna	19,297	14	Kenai	Kenai Peninsula	7,424
5	Badger	Fairbanks North Star	19,031	15	Steele Creek	Fairbanks North Star	6,437
6	College	Fairbanks North Star	11,332	16	Bethel	Unorganized Borough	6,325
7	North Lakes	Matanuska-Susitna	9,450	17	Chena Ridge	Fairbanks North Star	6,015
8	Meadow Lakes	Matanuska-Susitna	9,197	18	Sterling	Kenai Peninsula	5,918
9	Wasilla	Matanuska-Susitna	9,054	19	Palmer	Matanuska-Susitna	5,888
10	Tanaina	Matanuska-Susitna	8,817	20	Gateway	Matanuska-Susitna	5,748

=== Climate ===
Alaska has more acreage of public land owned by the federal government than any other state.

Alaska is the coldest state in the United States. The climate in the south and southeastern Alaska is a mid-latitude oceanic climate (Köppen climate classification: Cfb), and a subarctic oceanic climate (Köppen Cfc) in the northern parts, with cool summers and relatively mild winters. On an annual basis, the southeast is both the wettest and warmest part of Alaska with milder temperatures in the winter and high precipitation throughout the year. Juneau averages over 50 in (130 cm) of precipitation a year, and Ketchikan averages over 150 in (380 cm). This is also the only region in Alaska in which the average daytime high temperature is above freezing during the winter months.

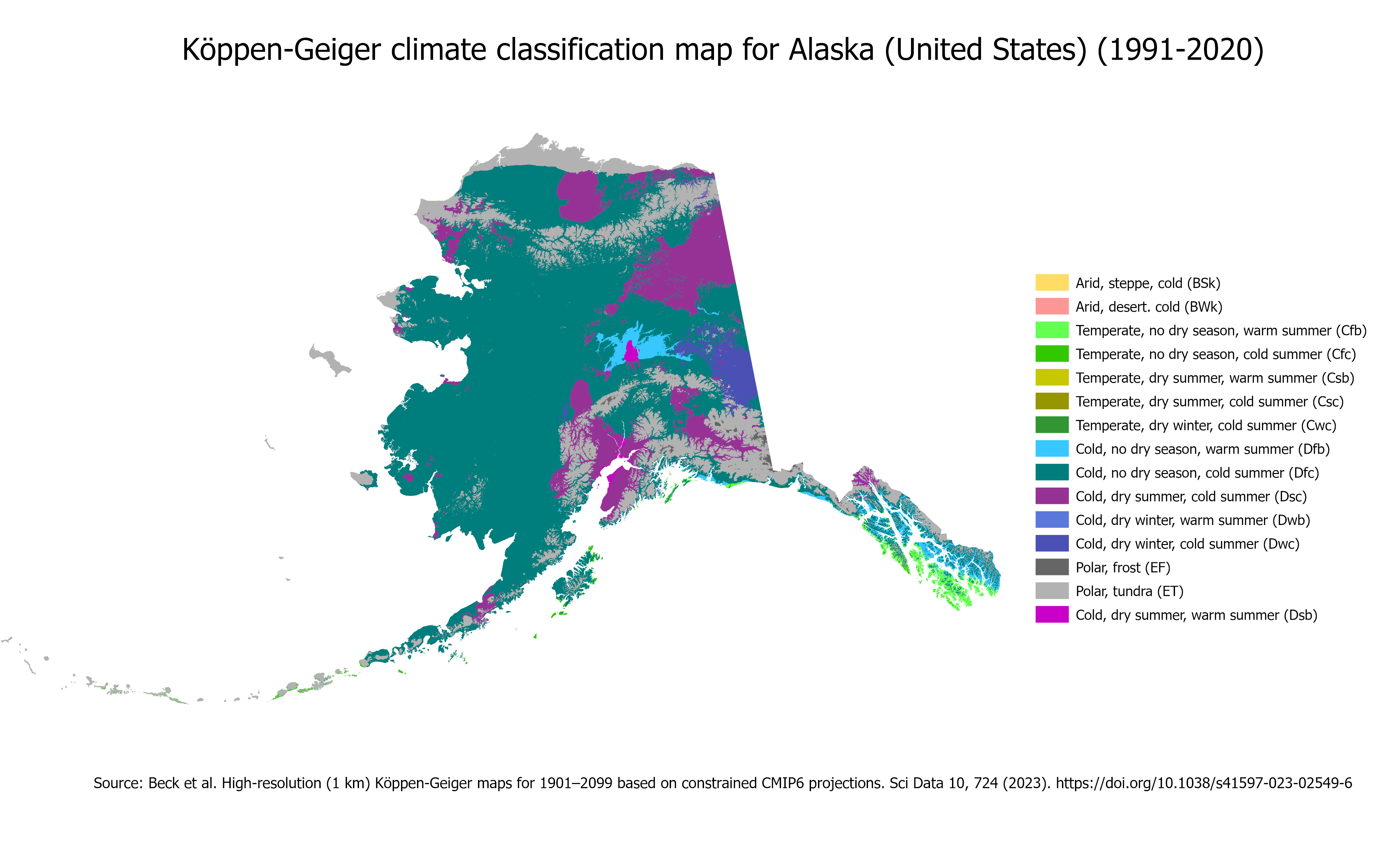
Köppen climate areas of Alaska

The climate of Anchorage and south central Alaska is mild by Alaskan standards due to the region's proximity to the seacoast. While the area gets less rain than southeast Alaska, it gets more snow, and days tend to be clearer. On average, Anchorage receives 16 in (41 cm) of precipitation a year, with around 75 in (190 cm) of snow, although there are areas in the south central which receive far more snow. It is a subarctic climate (Köppen: Dfc) due to its brief, cool summers.

The climate of western Alaska is determined in large part by the Bering Sea and the Gulf of Alaska. It is a subarctic oceanic climate in the southwest and a continental subarctic climate farther north. The temperature is somewhat moderate considering how far north the area is. This region has a tremendous amount of variety in precipitation. An area stretching from the northern side of the Seward Peninsula to the Kobuk River valley (i.e., the region around Kotzebue Sound) is technically a desert, with portions receiving less than 10 in (25 cm) of precipitation annually. On the other extreme, some locations between Dillingham and Bethel average around 100 in (250 cm) of precipitation.

The climate of the interior of Alaska is subarctic and is a classic example of a continental subarctic climate, except in a few valleys where the climate approaches humid continental (Köppen: Dfb). Some of the highest and lowest temperatures in Alaska occur around the area near Fairbanks. Summers are warm, albeit generally short, and may have temperatures reaching into the 90s °F (the low-to-mid 30s °C). In the long and very cold winters, the temperature can fall below −60 °F (−51 °C). Precipitation is sparse in the Interior, often less than 10 in (25 cm) a year, but what precipitation falls in the winter tends to stay the entire winter.

The highest and lowest recorded temperatures in Alaska are both in the Interior. The highest is 100 °F (38 °C) in Fort Yukon, which is just 8 mi or 13 km inside the arctic circle, on June 27, 1915, making Alaska tied with Hawaii as the state with the lowest high temperature in the United States. The lowest official Alaska temperature is −80 °F (−62 °C) in Prospect Creek on January 23, 1971, one degree above the lowest temperature recorded in continental North America (in Snag, Yukon, Canada).

The climate in the extreme north of Alaska, north of the Brooks Range, is Arctic (Köppen: ET) with long, very cold winters and short, cool summers. Even in July, the average low temperature in Utqiaġvik is 34 °F (1 °C). Precipitation is light in this part of Alaska, with many places averaging less than 10 in (25 cm) per year, mostly as snow which stays on the ground almost the entire year.

Average daily maximum and minimum temperatures for selected locations in Alaska
Location	July (°F)	July (°C)	January (°F)	January (°C)
Anchorage	65/51	18/10	22/11	−5/−11
Juneau	64/50	17/11	32/23	0/−4
Ketchikan	64/51	17/11	38/28	3/−1
Unalaska	57/46	14/8	36/28	2/−2
Fairbanks	72/53	22/11	1/−17	−17/−27
Fort Yukon	73/51	23/10	−11/−27	−23/−33
Nome	58/46	14/8	13/−2	−10/−19
Utqiaġvik	47/34	8/1	−7/−19	−21/−28

=== Fauna ===
Alaska is the last stronghold of many large mammals in the United States and is home to 112 species of mammal. Charismatic mammals of the state include gray wolves, Canada lynx, arctic and red fox, black, brown, and polar bears, walrus, sea otters, wolverines, moose, American bison, caribou, mountain goat, Muskoxen, and dall sheep. The state is home to 6 native amphibian species, the Columbia spotted frog, wood frog, rough-skinned newt, long-toed salamander, northwestern salamander, and western toad. Over 500 bird species have been documented in Alaska, most of which are migratory visitors during the warmer summer months. Charismatic birds of the state include emperor goose, trumpeter swan, king eider, willow ptarmigan, sandhill crane, American golden plover, Hudsonian whimbrel, Dunlin, marbled murrelet, tufted puffin, Bonaparte's gull, bald eagle, snowy owl, gyrfalcon, Canada jay, boreal chickadee, pine grosbeak, redpoll, and snow bunting. The state has one endemic bird, the McKay's bunting which is only found on the islands of Hall and St. Matthew. The freshwater ecosystems of the state are home to a wide array of fish including northern pike, pink, chum, coho, sockeye, and chinook salmon, rainbow trout, and arctic lamprey. Saltwater fish of the state include Pacific halibut, Pacific cod, and yelloweye rockfish. The coastal waters of the state are also home to a wide variety of cetaceans including harbor porpoise, Pacific white-sided dolphin, orca, humpback whale, bowhead whale, fin whale, gray whale, and beluga.

== Demographics ==
Historical population
Census	Pop.	Note	%±
1880	33,426		—
1890	32,052		−4.1%
1900	63,592		98.4%
1910	64,356		1.2%
1920	55,036		−14.5%
1930	59,278		7.7%
1940	72,524		22.3%
1950	128,643		77.4%
1960	226,167		75.8%
1970	300,382		32.8%
1980	401,851		33.8%
1990	550,043		36.9%
2000	626,932		14.0%
2010	710,231		13.3%
2020	733,391		3.3%
2025 (est.)	737,270		0.5%
1930 and 1940 censuses taken in preceding autumn Sources: 1910–2020

The United States Census Bureau found in the 2020 United States census that the population of Alaska was 733,391 on April 1, 2020, a 3.3% increase since the 2010 United States census. In the 2010 United States Census, Alaska had a population of 710,231, an increase of 13.3%, up from 626,932 at the 2000 U.S. census.

In 2020, Alaska ranked as the 48th largest state by population, ahead of only Vermont and Wyoming. Alaska is the least densely populated state, and one of the most sparsely populated areas in the world, at 1.2 inhabitants per square mile (0.46/km^{2}). The next state, Wyoming, has 5.8 inhabitants per square mile (2.2/km^{2}). Alaska is by far the largest U.S. state by area, and the tenth wealthiest, per capita income. As of 2018 due to its population size, it is one of 14 U.S. states that still have only one telephone area code.

In HUD's 2022 Annual Homeless Assessment Report, there were an estimated 2,320 homeless people in Alaska.

=== Race and ethnicity ===
Alaska racial breakdown of population
Racial composition	1970	1990	2000	2010	2020
White	78.8%	75.5%	69.3%	66.7%	59.4%
Native	16.9%	15.6%	15.6%	14.8%	15.2%
Asian	0.9%	3.6%	4.0%	5.4%	6.0%
Black	3.0%	4.1%	3.5%	3.3%	3.0%
Native Hawaiian and other Pacific Islander	–	–	0.5%	1.0%	1.7%
Other race	0.4%	1.2%	1.6%	1.6%	2.5%
Multiracial	–	–	5.5%	7.3%	12.2%

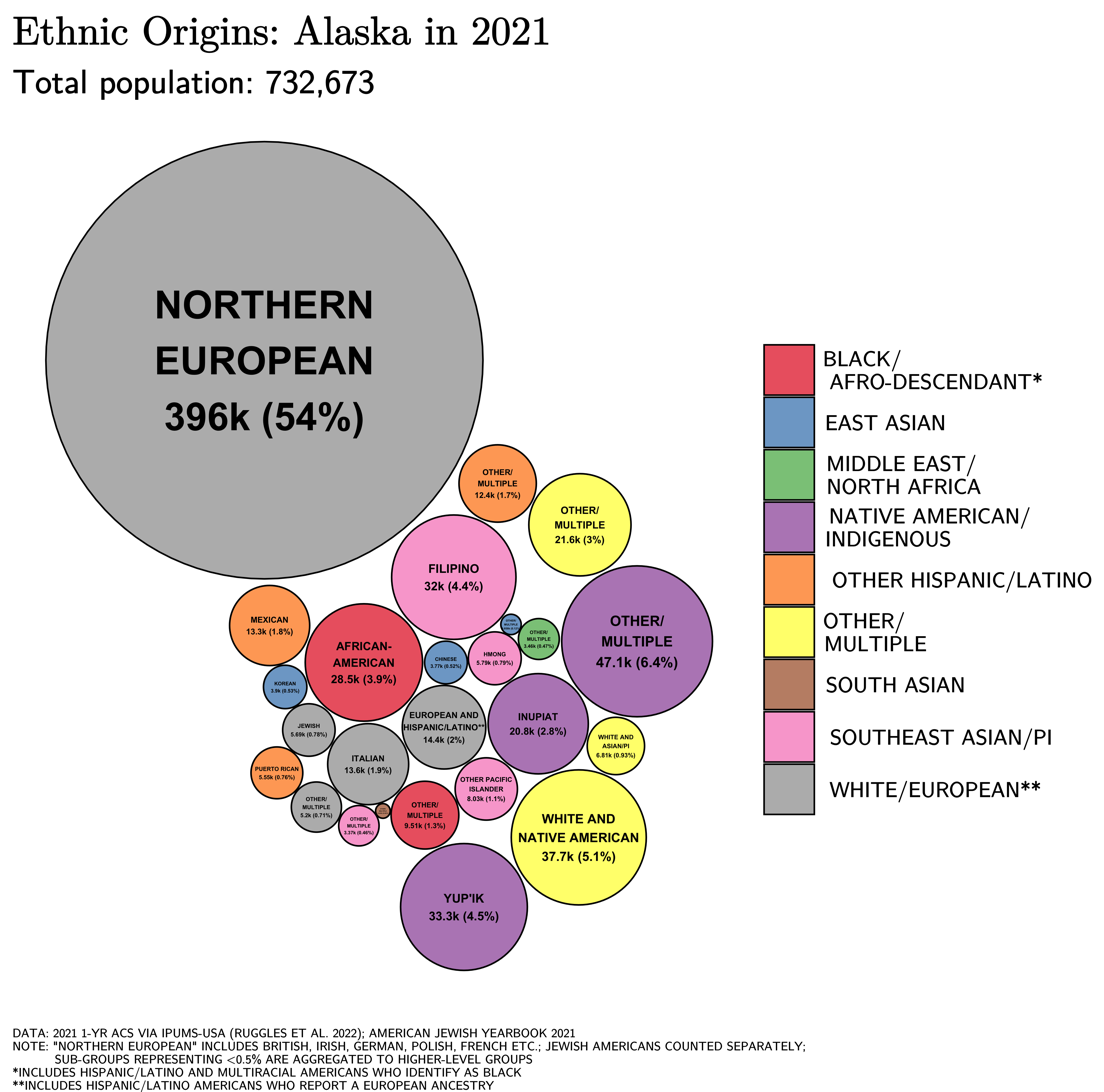
Ethnic origins in Alaska, 2021

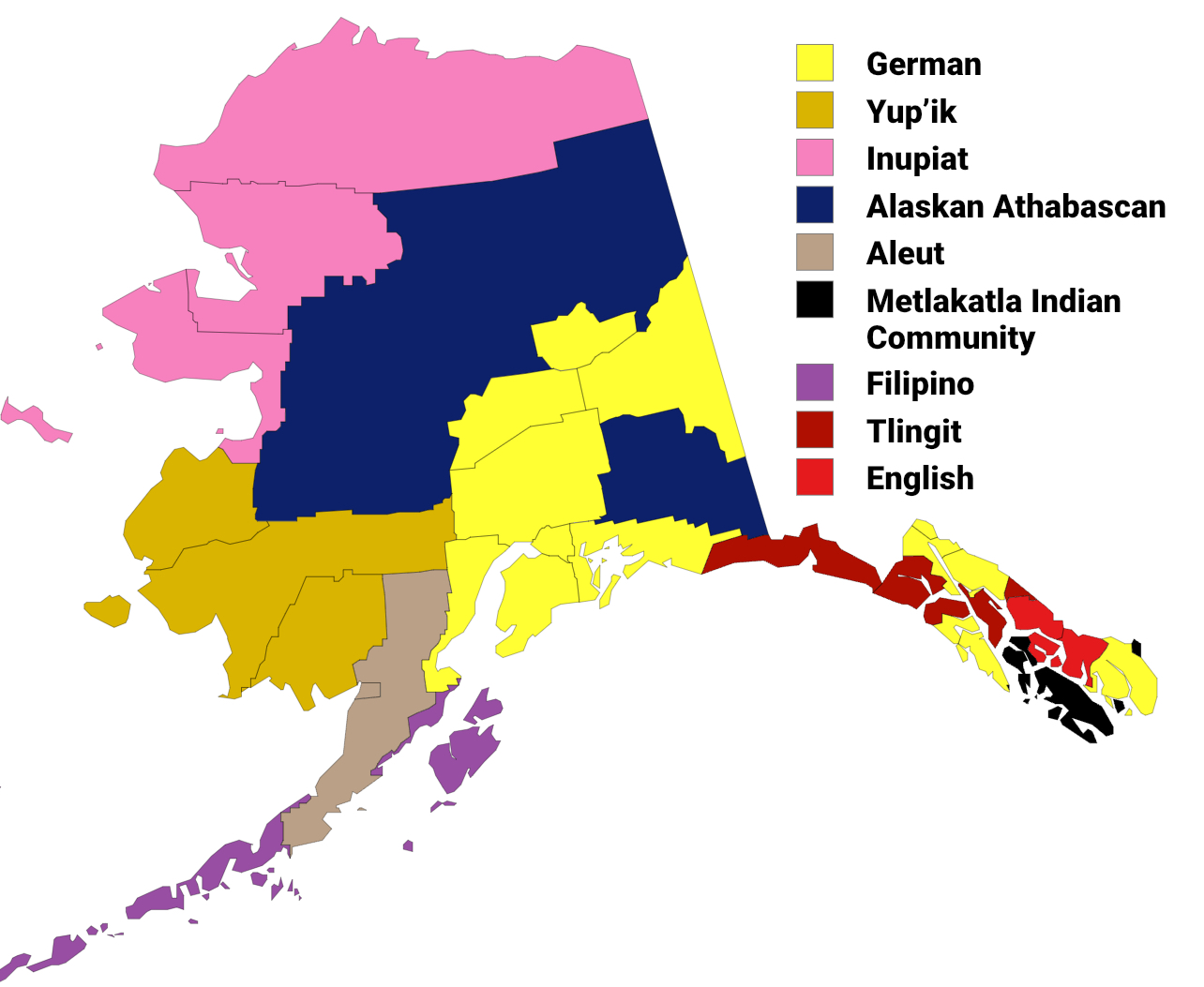
Largest alone or in any combination ethnic origin by county in Alaska, per the 2020 census

A map of the largest racial/ethnic group by borough and census area. Red indicates Native American, and blue indicates non-Hispanic white. Darker shades indicate a higher proportion of the population.

The 2019 American Community Survey estimated 60.2% of the population was white, 3.7% black or African American, 15.6% American Indian or Alaska Native, 6.5% Asian, 1.4% Native Hawaiian and other Pacific Islander, 7.5% two or more races, and 7.3% Hispanic or Latin American. At the survey estimates, 7.8% of the total population was foreign-born from 2015 to 2019.

In 2015, 61.3% were white, 3.4% black or African American, 13.3% American Indian or Alaska Native, 6.2% Asian, 0.9% Native Hawaiian and other Pacific Islander, 0.3% some other race, and 7.7% multiracial. Hispanics and Latin Americans were 7% of the state population in 2015. From 2015 to 2019, the largest Hispanic and Latin American groups were Mexican Americans, Puerto Ricans, and Cuban Americans. The largest Asian groups living in the state were Filipinos, Korean Americans, and Japanese and Chinese Americans.

In 2010, Alaska was 64.1% white, 14.8% American Indian and Alaska Native, 5.4% Asian, 3.3% black or African American, 1.0% Native Hawaiian and other Pacific Islander, 1.6% from some other race, and 7.3% from two or more races in 2010. Hispanics or Latin Americans made up 5.5% of the population in 2010. As of 2011, 50.7% of Alaska's population younger than one year of age belonged to minority groups (i.e., did not have two parents of white ancestry). In 1960, the United States Census Bureau reported Alaska's population as 77.2% white, 3% black, and 18.8% American Indian and Alaska Native.

In 2018, the top countries of origin for Alaska's immigrants were the Philippines, Mexico, Canada, Thailand and South Korea.

=== Languages ===
In the 2011 American Community Survey, 83.4% of people over the age of five spoke only English at home. About 3.5% spoke Spanish at home, 2.2% spoke another Indo-European language, about 4.3% spoke an Asian language (including Tagalog), and about 5.3% spoke other languages at home. In 2019, the American Community Survey determined 83.7% spoke only English, and 16.3% spoke another language other than English. The most spoken European language after English was Spanish, spoken by approximately 4.0% of the state population. Collectively, Asian and Pacific Islander languages were spoken by 5.6% of Alaskans. Since 2010, 5.2% of Alaskans speak one of the state's 20 Indigenous languages, known locally as "Native languages". Alaska is also known for a distinctive dialect of Russian, named Alaskan Russian.

The Alaska Native Language Center at the University of Alaska Fairbanks claims that at least twenty Alaska Native languages exist and there are also some languages with different dialects. Most of Alaska's Native languages belong to either the Eskimo–Aleut or Na-Dene language families. Some languages are thought to be isolates (e.g., Haida) or have not yet been classified (e.g., Tsimshianic). In 2014, nearly all of Alaska's Native languages were classified as either threatened, shifting, moribund, nearly extinct, or dormant languages.

In October 2014, the governor of Alaska signed a bill declaring the state's 20 Indigenous languages to have official status. This bill gave them symbolic recognition as official languages, though they have not been adopted for official use within the government. In May 2024, a bill replaced Tanana with Middle Tanana and Lower Tanana (joining Upper Tanana) and added Cupʼig and Wetał. The 23 Indigenous languages that were included in the bill along with English are:

1. Inupiaq
2. Siberian Yupik
3. Central Alaskan Yup'ik
4. Cupʼig
5. Alutiiq
6. Unangax
7. Dena'ina
8. Deg Xinag
9. Holikachuk
10. Koyukon
11. Upper Kuskokwim
12. Gwich'in
13. Upper Tanana
14. Sahcheeg xut'een xneege' (Middle Tanana)
15. Benhti Kokhwt'ana Kenaga' (Lower Tanana)
16. Tanacross
17. Hän
18. Ahtna
19. Wetał (Ts'etsa'ut)
20. Eyak
21. Tlingit
22. Haida
23. Tsimshian

=== Religion ===
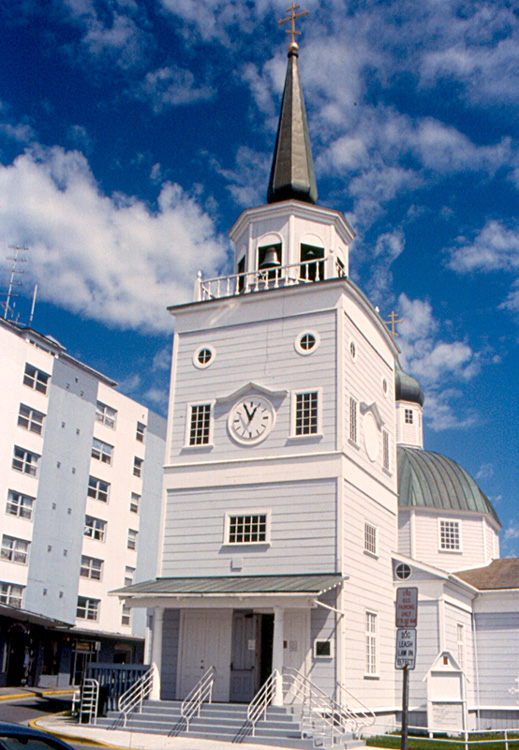
St. Michael's Russian Orthodox Cathedral in downtown Sitka

Religious self-identification in Alaska per the Public Religion Research Institute's 2020 survey.
1. Unaffiliated (37.0%)
2. Protestantism (36.0%)
3. Catholicism (14.0%)
4. Eastern Orthodox (4.00%)
5. Mormonism (2.00%)
6. Jehovah's Witness (1.00%)
7. Other (6.00%)

Multiple surveys have ranked Alaska among the most irreligious states.

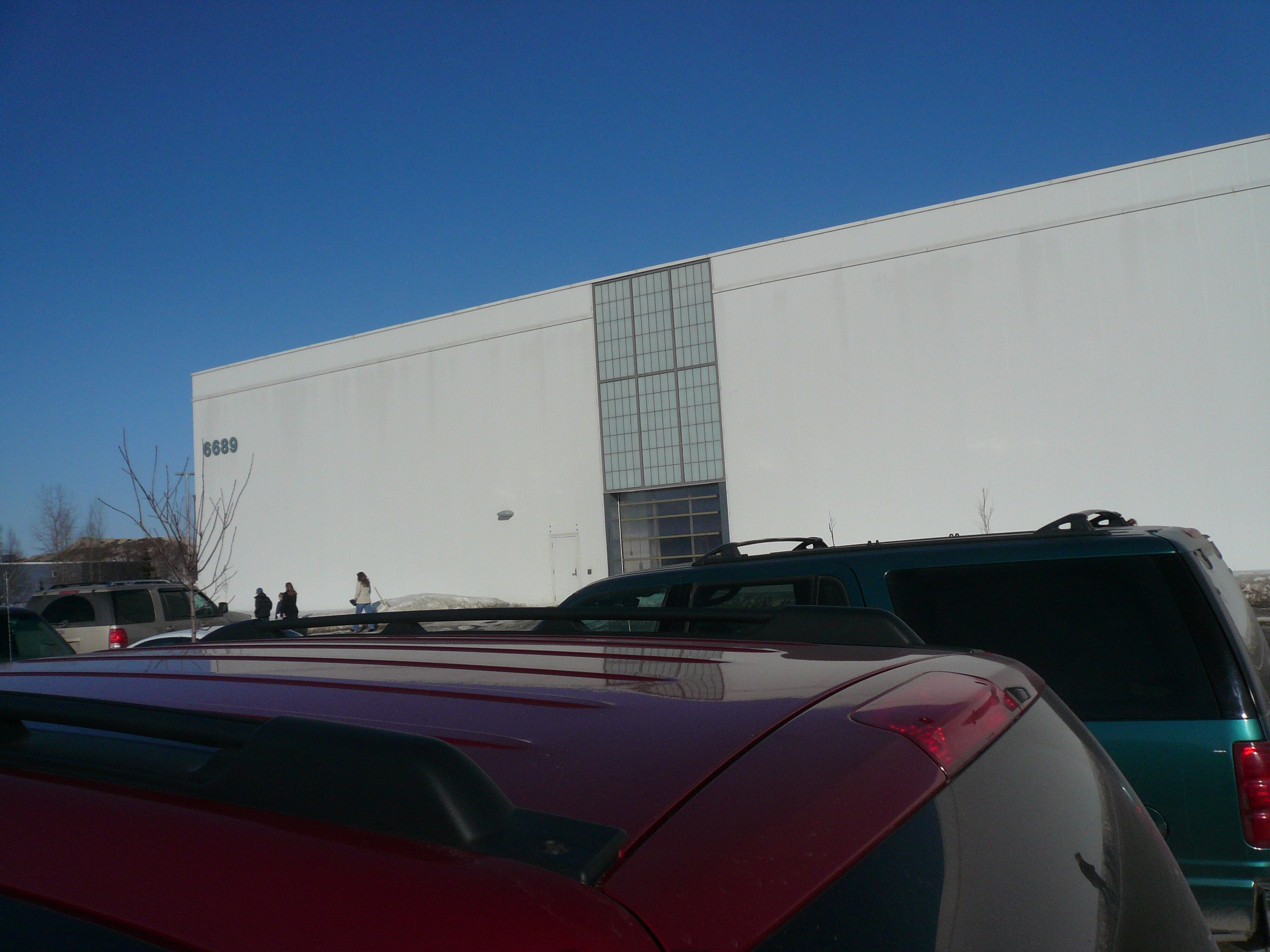
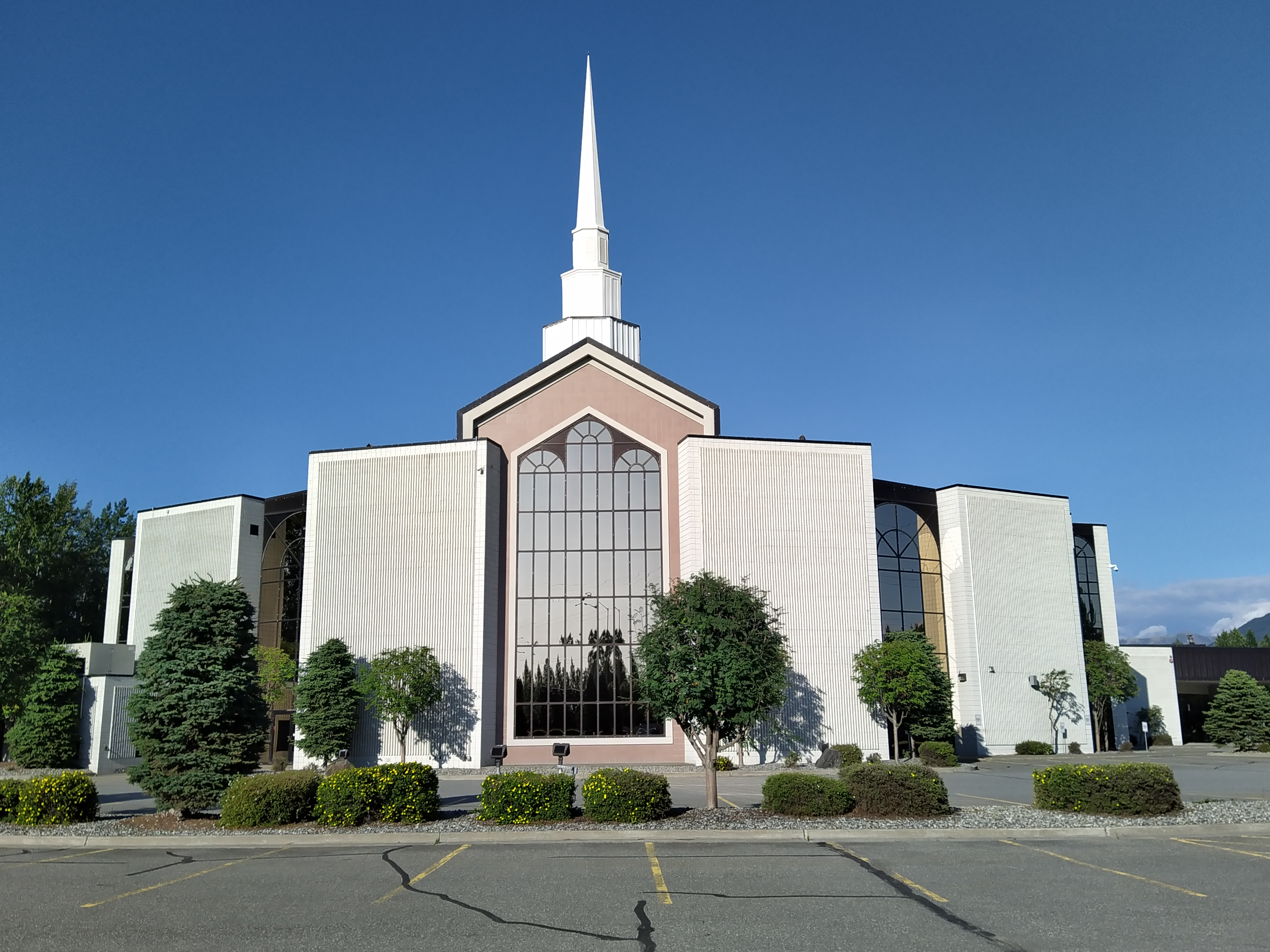
ChangePoint in south Anchorage (left) and Anchorage Baptist Temple in east Anchorage are Alaska's largest churches in terms of attendance and membership.

In 2010, per the Association of Religion Data Archives (ARDA), about 34% of Alaska residents were members of religious congregations. Of the religious population, roughly 4% were Mormon, 0.5% Jewish, 0.5% Muslim, 1% Buddhist, 0.2% Baháʼí, and 0.5% Hindu.

In 2010, the largest religious denominations in Alaska were the Catholic Church with 50,866 adherents; non-denominational Evangelicals with 38,070 adherents; The Church of Jesus Christ of Latter-day Saints with 32,170 adherents; and the Southern Baptist Convention with 19,891 adherents. Alaska has been identified, along with Washington and Oregon in the Pacific Northwest, as being the least religious states in the United States, in terms of church membership.

The Pew Research Center in 2014 determined 62% of the adult population practiced Christianity. Of the Christian denominations, Catholicism was the largest Christian group. When Protestant denominations were combined, Protestantism was the largest Christian tradition, with Evangelicalism being the largest movement within the Protestant group. The unaffiliated population made up the largest non-Christian religious affiliation at 37%. Atheists made up 5% of the population and the largest non-Christian religion was Buddhism. In 2020, the Public Religion Research Institute (PRRI) determined 57% of adults were Christian. By 2022, Christianity increased to 77% of the population according to the PRRI.

Through the Association of Religion Data Archives in 2020, its Christian population was dominated by non/inter-denominational Protestantism as the single largest Christian cohort, with 73,930 adherents. Roman Catholics were second with 40,280 members; throughout its Christian population, non-denominational Christians had an adherence rate of 100.81 per 1,000 residents, and Catholics 54.92 per 1,000 residents. Per 2014's Pew study, religion was seen as very important to 41% of the population, although 29% considered it somewhat important.

In 2014, Pew determined roughly 55% believed in God with absolute certainty, and 24% believed fairly certainly. Reflecting the separate 2020 ARDA study, the 2014 Pew study showed 30% attended religious services once a week, 34% once or twice a month, and 36% seldom/never. In 2018, The Gospel Coalition published an article using Pew data and determined non-churchgoing Christians nationwide did not attend religious services often through the following: practicing the faith in other ways, not finding a house of worship they liked, disliking sermons and feeling unwelcomed, and logistics.

In 1795, the first Russian Orthodox Church was established in Kodiak. Intermarriage with Alaska Natives helped the Russian immigrants integrate into society. As a result, an increasing number of Russian Orthodox churches gradually became established within Alaska. Alaska also has the largest Quaker population (by percentage) of any state. In 2009, there were 6,000 Jews in Alaska, for whom observance of halakha may pose special problems.

Alaskan Hindus often share venues and celebrations with members of other Asian religious communities, including Sikhs and Jains. In 2010, Alaskan Hindus established the Sri Ganesha Temple of Alaska, making it the first Hindu Temple in Alaska and the northernmost Hindu Temple in the world. There are an estimated 2,000–3,000 Hindus in Alaska. The vast majority of Hindus live in Anchorage or Fairbanks.

Estimates for the number of Muslims in Alaska range from 2,000 to 5,000. In 2020, ARDA estimated there were 400 Muslims in the state. The Islamic Community Center of Anchorage began efforts in the late 1990s to construct a mosque in Anchorage. They broke ground on a building in south Anchorage in 2010 and were nearing completion in late 2014. When completed, the mosque was the first in the state and one of the northernmost mosques in the world. There is also a Baháʼí center, and there were 690 adherents in 2020. Additionally, there were 469 adherents of Hinduism and Yoga altogether in 2020, and a small number of Buddhists were present.

== Economy ==
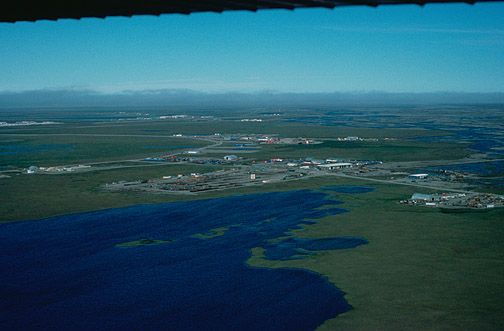
An aerial view of infrastructure at the Prudhoe Bay Oil Field

In October 2022, Alaska had a total employment of 316,900. The number of employer establishments was 21,077. As of August 2025, the unemployment rate was 4.7%. The state's historically lowest unemployment rate was recorded in August 2022 at 3.8%, and its highest in May 2020 at 11.7%.

According to the U.S. Bureau of Economic Analysis, Alaska's gross state product was $75.011 billion in 2025. Its per capita personal income was $80,175 in 2025. According to a 2013 study by Phoenix Marketing International, Alaska had the fifth-largest number of millionaires per capita in the United States, with a ratio of 6.75 percent. The oil and gas industry dominates the Alaskan economy, with more than 80% of the state's revenues derived from petroleum extraction. Alaska's main export product, excluding oil and natural gas, is seafood, primarily salmon, cod, pollock and crab.

Agriculture represents a minuscule fraction of the Alaskan economy. Agricultural production is primarily for consumption within the state and includes nursery stock, dairy products, vegetables, and livestock. Manufacturing is limited, with most foodstuffs and general goods imported from elsewhere.

Employment is primarily in government and industries such as natural resource extraction, shipping, and transportation. Military bases are a significant component of the economy in Anchorage and the Fairbanks North Star and Kodiak Island boroughs. In 2025, 99.1% of Alaska businesses are small businesses and employ 54.2% of the state's workforce. Federal subsidies are also an important part of the economy, allowing the state to keep taxes low. Its industrial outputs are crude petroleum, natural gas, coal, gold, precious metals, zinc and other mining, seafood processing, timber and wood products. There is also a growing service and tourism sector. Tourists have contributed to the economy by supporting local lodging.

=== Energy ===
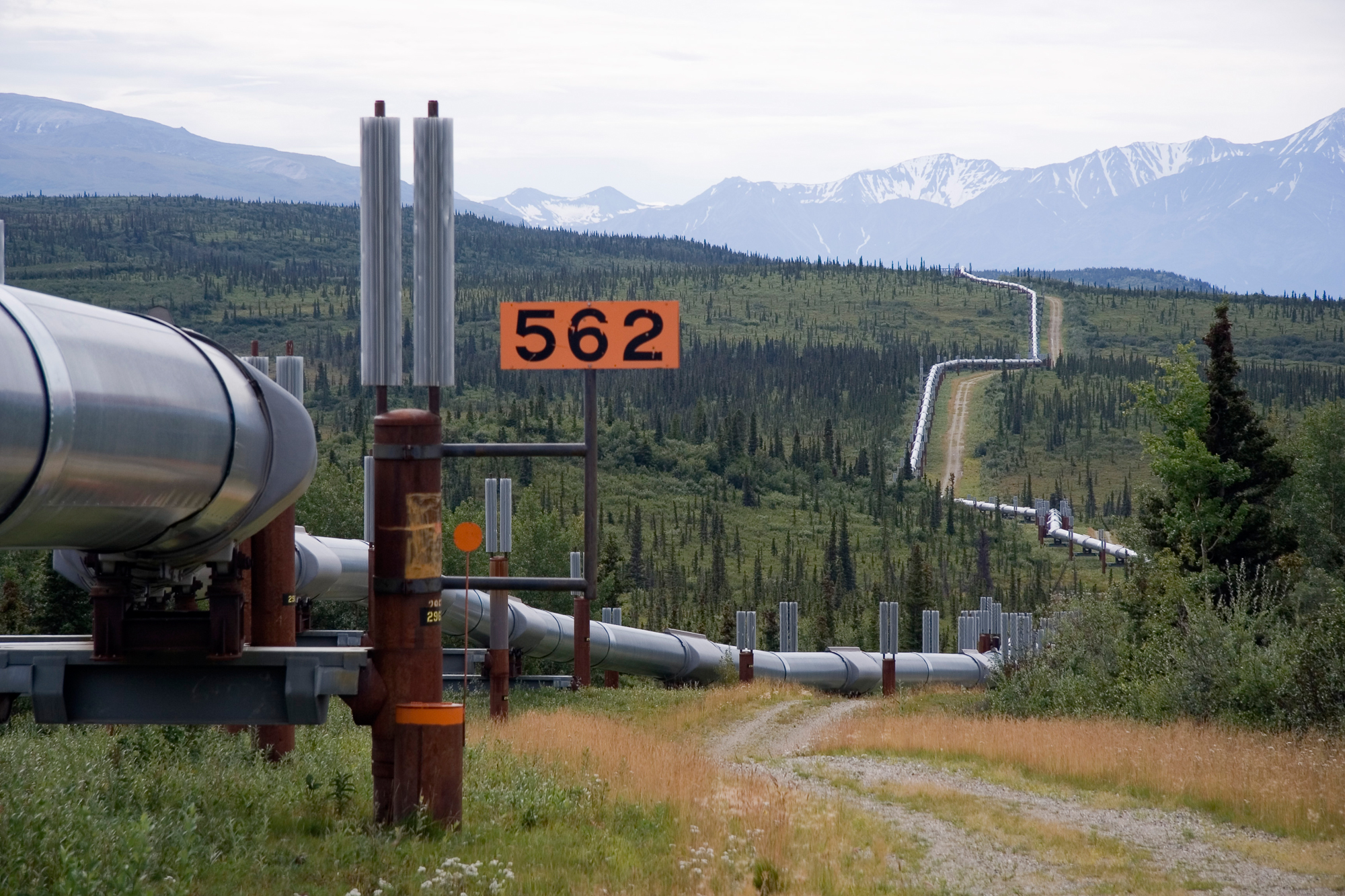
The Trans-Alaska Pipeline transports oil, Alaska's most financially important export, from the North Slope to Valdez. The heat pipes in the column mounts are pertinent, since they disperse heat upwards and prevent melting of permafrost.

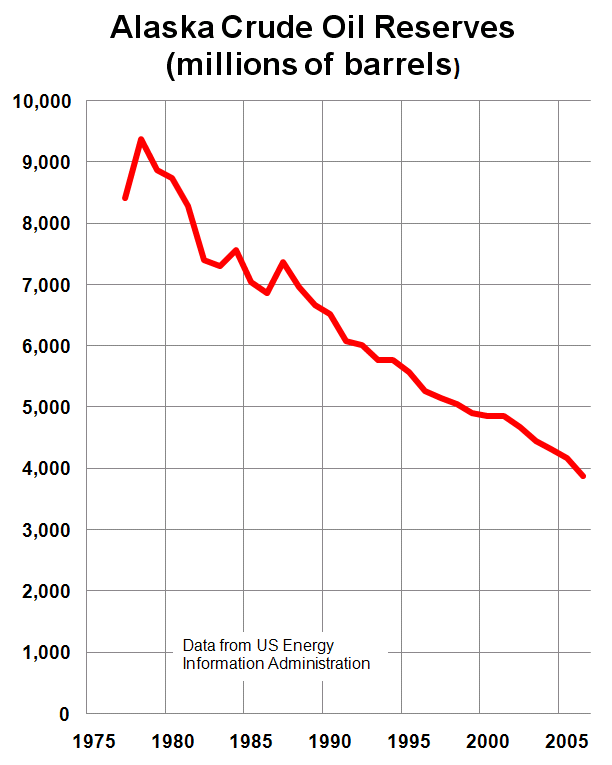
Alaska proven oil reserves peaked in 1973 and have declined more than 60% since then.

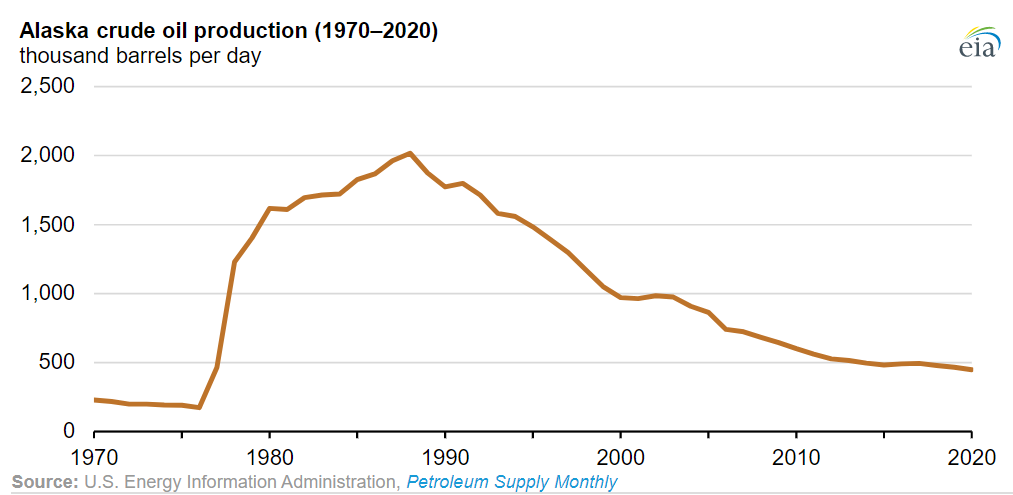
Alaskan oil production peaked in 1988 and has declined more than 75% since then.

Alaska has vast energy resources, although its oil reserves have been largely depleted. Major oil and gas reserves were found in the Alaska North Slope (ANS) and Cook Inlet basins, but according to the Energy Information Administration, by February 2014 Alaska had fallen to fourth place in the nation in crude oil production after Texas, North Dakota, and California.

Prudhoe Bay on Alaska's North Slope is still the second highest-yielding oil field in the United States, typically producing about 400,000 barrels per day (64,000 m^{3}/d), although by early 2014 North Dakota's Bakken Formation was producing over 900,000 barrels per day (140,000 m^{3}/d). Prudhoe Bay was the largest conventional oil field ever discovered in North America, but was much smaller than Canada's enormous Athabasca oil sands field, which by 2014 was producing about 1,500,000 barrels per day (240,000 m^{3}/d) of unconventional oil, and had hundreds of years of producible reserves at that rate.

The Trans-Alaska Pipeline can transport and pump up to 2.1 million barrels (330,000 m^{3}) of crude oil per day, more than any other crude oil pipeline in the United States. Substantial coal deposits are found in Alaska's bituminous, sub-bituminous, and lignite coal basins. The United States Geological Survey estimates that there are 85.4 trillion cubic feet (2,420 km^{3}) of undiscovered, technically recoverable gas from natural gas hydrates on the Alaskan North Slope. Alaska also offers some of the highest hydroelectric power potential in the country from its numerous rivers. Large swaths of the Alaskan coastline offer wind and geothermal energy potential as well.

Alaska's economy depends heavily on increasingly expensive diesel fuel for heating, transportation, electric power and light. Although wind and hydroelectric power are abundant and underdeveloped, proposals for statewide energy systems were judged uneconomical (at the time of the report, 2001) due to low (less than 50¢/gal) fuel prices, long distances and low population. The cost of a gallon of gas in urban Alaska is usually thirty to sixty cents higher than the national average; prices in rural areas are generally significantly higher but vary widely depending on transportation costs, seasonal usage peaks, nearby petroleum development infrastructure and many other factors.

==== Permanent Fund ====
The Alaska Permanent Fund is a constitutionally authorized appropriation of oil revenues, established by voters in 1976 to manage a surplus in state petroleum revenues from oil, largely in anticipation of the then recently constructed Trans-Alaska Pipeline System. The fund was originally proposed by Governor Keith Miller on the eve of the 1969 Prudhoe Bay lease sale, out of fear that the legislature would spend the entire proceeds of the sale (which amounted to $900 million) at once. It was later championed by Governor Jay Hammond and Kenai state representative Hugh Malone. It has served as an attractive political prospect ever since, diverting revenues which would normally be deposited into the general fund.

The Alaska Constitution was written so as to discourage dedicating state funds for a particular purpose. The Permanent Fund has become the rare exception to this, mostly due to the political climate of distrust existing during the time of its creation. From its initial principal of $734,000, the fund has grown to $50 billion as a result of oil royalties and capital investment programs. Most if not all the principal is invested conservatively outside Alaska. This has led to frequent calls by Alaskan politicians for the Fund to make investments within Alaska, though such a stance has never gained momentum.

Starting in 1982, dividends from the fund's annual growth have been paid out each year to eligible Alaskans, ranging from an initial $1,000 in 1982 (equal to three years' payout, as the distribution of payments was held up in a lawsuit over the distribution scheme) to $3,269 in 2008 (which included a one-time $1,200 "Resource Rebate"). Every year, the state legislature takes out 8% from the earnings, puts 3% back into the principal for inflation proofing, and the remaining 5% is distributed to all qualifying Alaskans. To qualify for the Permanent Fund Dividend, one must have lived in the state for a minimum of 12 months, maintain constant residency subject to allowable absences, and not be subject to court judgments or criminal convictions which fall under various disqualifying classifications or may subject the payment amount to civil garnishment.

The Permanent Fund is often considered to be one of the leading examples of a basic income policy in the world.

=== Cost of living ===
The cost of goods in Alaska has long been higher than in the contiguous 48 states. Federal government employees, particularly United States Postal Service (USPS) workers and active-duty military members, receive a Cost of Living Allowance usually set at 25% of base pay because, while the cost of living has gone down, it is still one of the highest in the country.

Rural Alaska suffers from severely high prices for food and consumer goods compared to the rest of the country, due to the relatively limited transportation infrastructure.

=== Agriculture and fishing ===
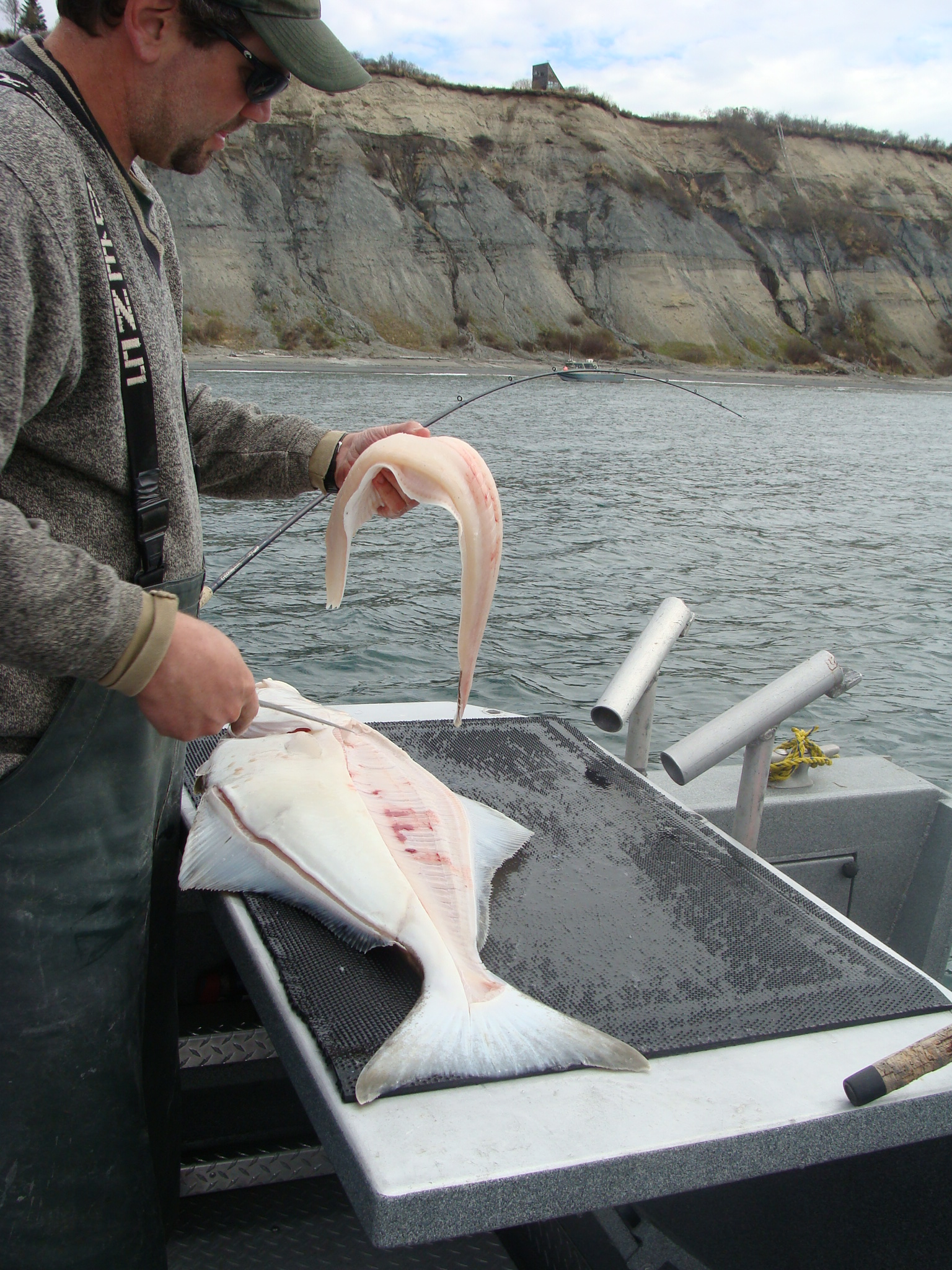
Halibut, both as a sport fish and commercially, is important to the state's economy.

Due to the northern climate and short growing season, relatively little farming occurs in Alaska. Most farms are in either the Matanuska Valley, about 40 miles (64 km) northeast of Anchorage, or on the Kenai Peninsula, about 60 miles (97 km) southwest of Anchorage. The short 100-day growing season limits the crops that can be grown, but the long sunny summer days make those seasons productive. The primary crops are potatoes, carrots, lettuce, and cabbage.

The Tanana Valley is another notable agricultural locus, especially the Delta Junction area, about 100 miles (160 km) southeast of Fairbanks, with a sizable concentration of farms growing agronomic crops; these farms mostly lie north and east of Fort Greely. This area was largely set aside and developed under a state program spearheaded by Hammond during his second term as governor. Delta-area crops consist predominantly of barley and hay. West of Fairbanks lies another concentration of small farms catering to restaurants, the hotel and tourist industry, and community-supported agriculture.

Alaskan agriculture has experienced a surge in growth of market gardeners, small farms and farmers' markets in recent years, with the highest percentage increase (46%) in the nation in growth in farmers' markets in 2011, compared to 17% nationwide. The peony industry has also taken off, as the growing season allows farmers to harvest during a gap in supply elsewhere in the world, thereby filling a niche in the flower market.

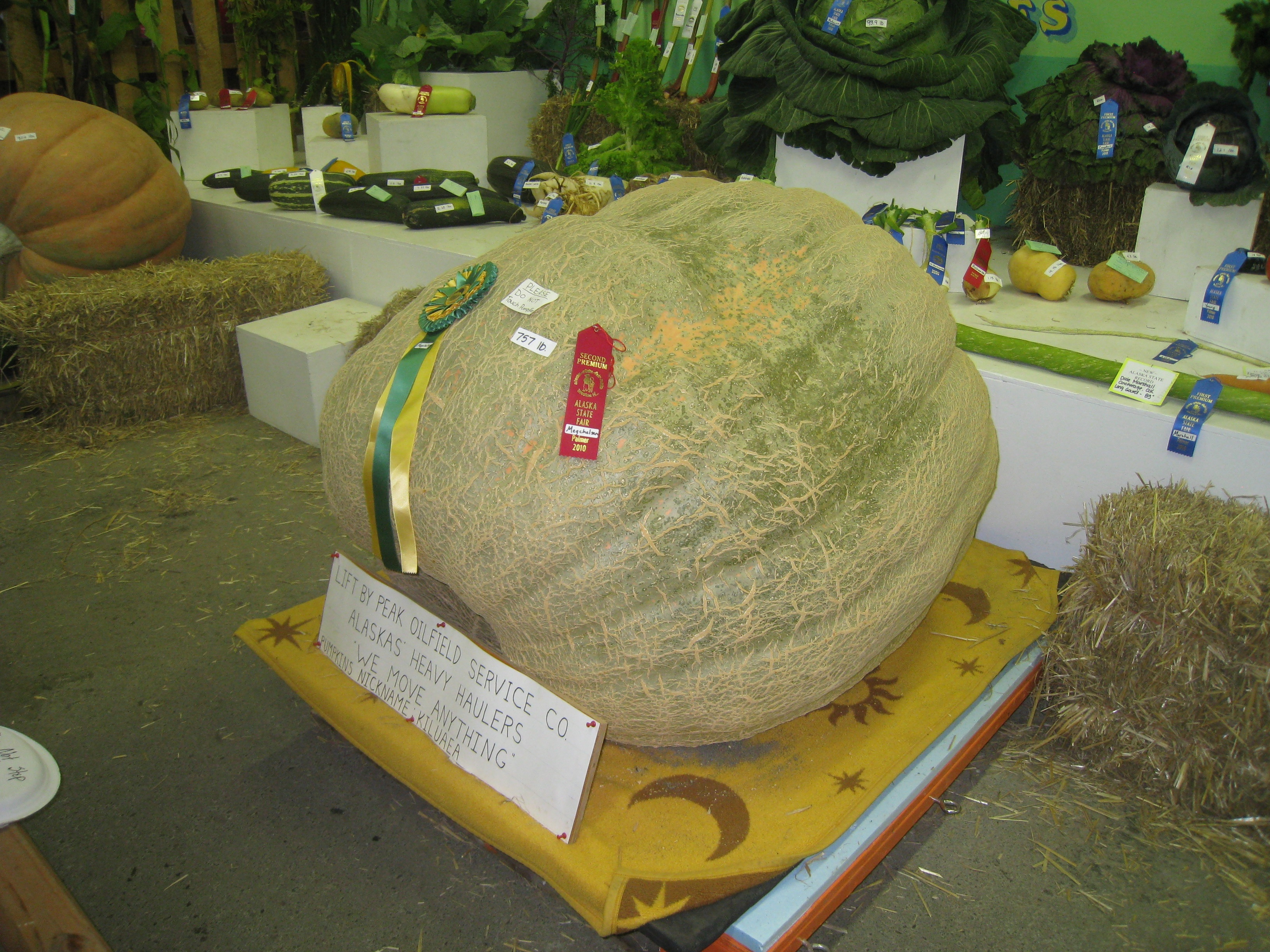
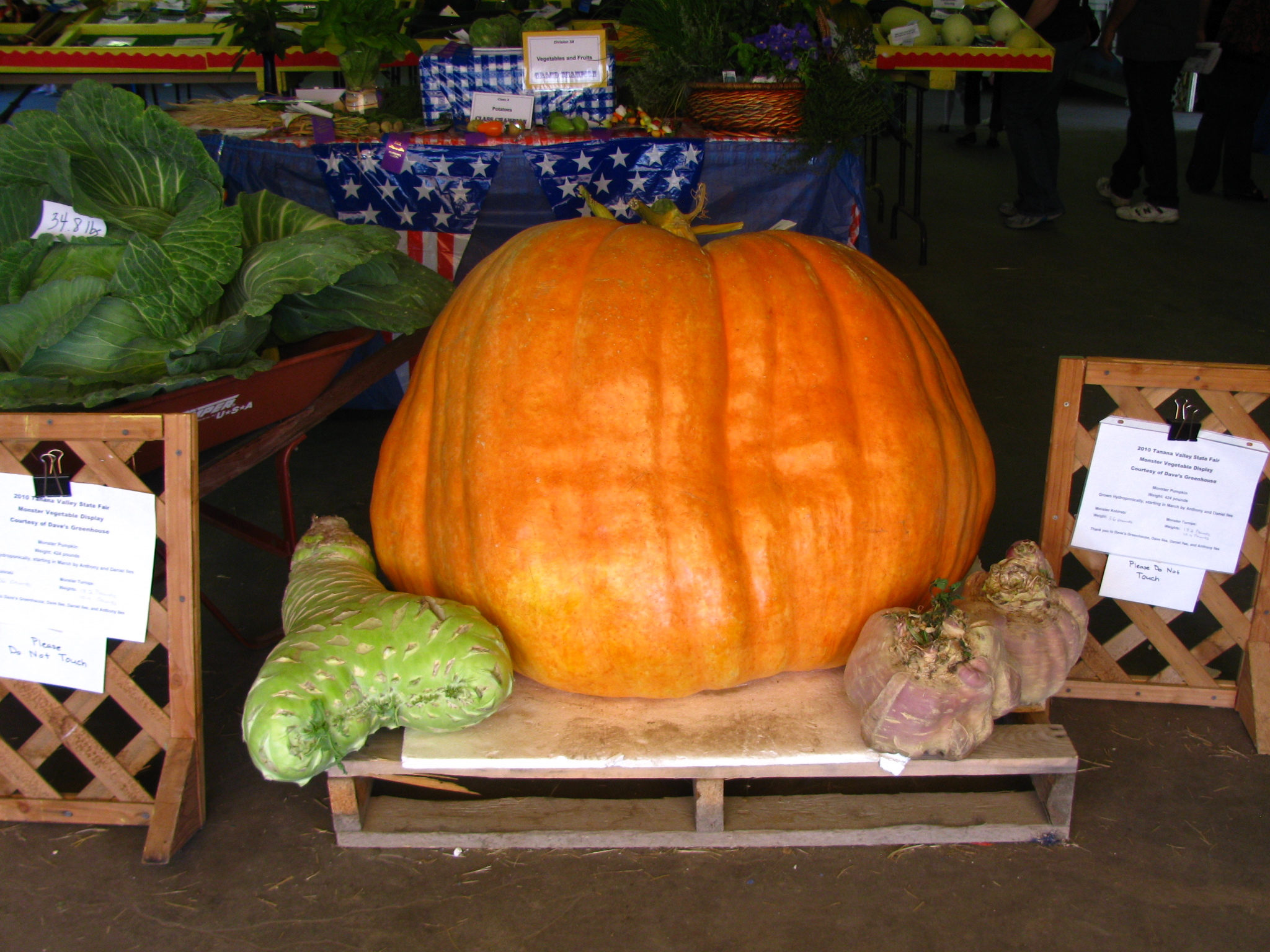
Oversized vegetables on display at the Alaska State Fair (left) and the Tanana Valley State Fair

Alaska, with no counties, lacks county fairs. Instead, a small assortment of state and local fairs (with the Alaska State Fair in Palmer the largest), are held mostly in the late summer. The fairs are mostly located in communities with historic or current agricultural activity, and feature local farmers exhibiting produce in addition to more high-profile commercial activities such as carnival rides, concerts and food. "Alaska Grown" is used as an agricultural slogan.

Alaska has an abundance of seafood, with the primary fisheries in the Bering Sea and the North Pacific. Seafood is one of the few food items that is often cheaper within the state than outside it. Many Alaskans take advantage of salmon seasons to harvest portions of their household diet while fishing for subsistence, as well as sport. This includes fish taken by hook, net or wheel.

Hunting for subsistence, primarily caribou, moose, and Dall sheep is still common in the state, particularly in remote Bush communities. An example of a traditional native food is Akutaq, the Eskimo ice cream, which can consist of reindeer fat, seal oil, dried fish meat and local berries.

Alaska's reindeer herding is concentrated on Seward Peninsula, where wild caribou can be prevented from mingling and migrating with the domesticated reindeer.

Most food in Alaska is transported into the state from "Outside" (the other 49 U.S. states), and shipping costs make food in the cities relatively expensive. In rural areas, subsistence hunting and gathering is an essential activity because imported food is prohibitively expensive. Although most small towns and villages in Alaska lie along the coastline, the cost of importing food to remote villages can be high because of the terrain and difficult road conditions, which change dramatically due to varying climate and precipitation changes. Transport costs can reach 50¢ per pound ($1.10/kg) or higher in some remote areas during times of inclement weather or rough terrain conditions, if these locations can be reached at all. The cost of delivering a gallon (3.8 L) of milk is about $3.50 in many villages where per capita income can be $20,000 or less. Fuel cost per gallon is routinely twenty to thirty cents higher than the contiguous United States average, with only Hawaii having higher prices.

== Culture ==
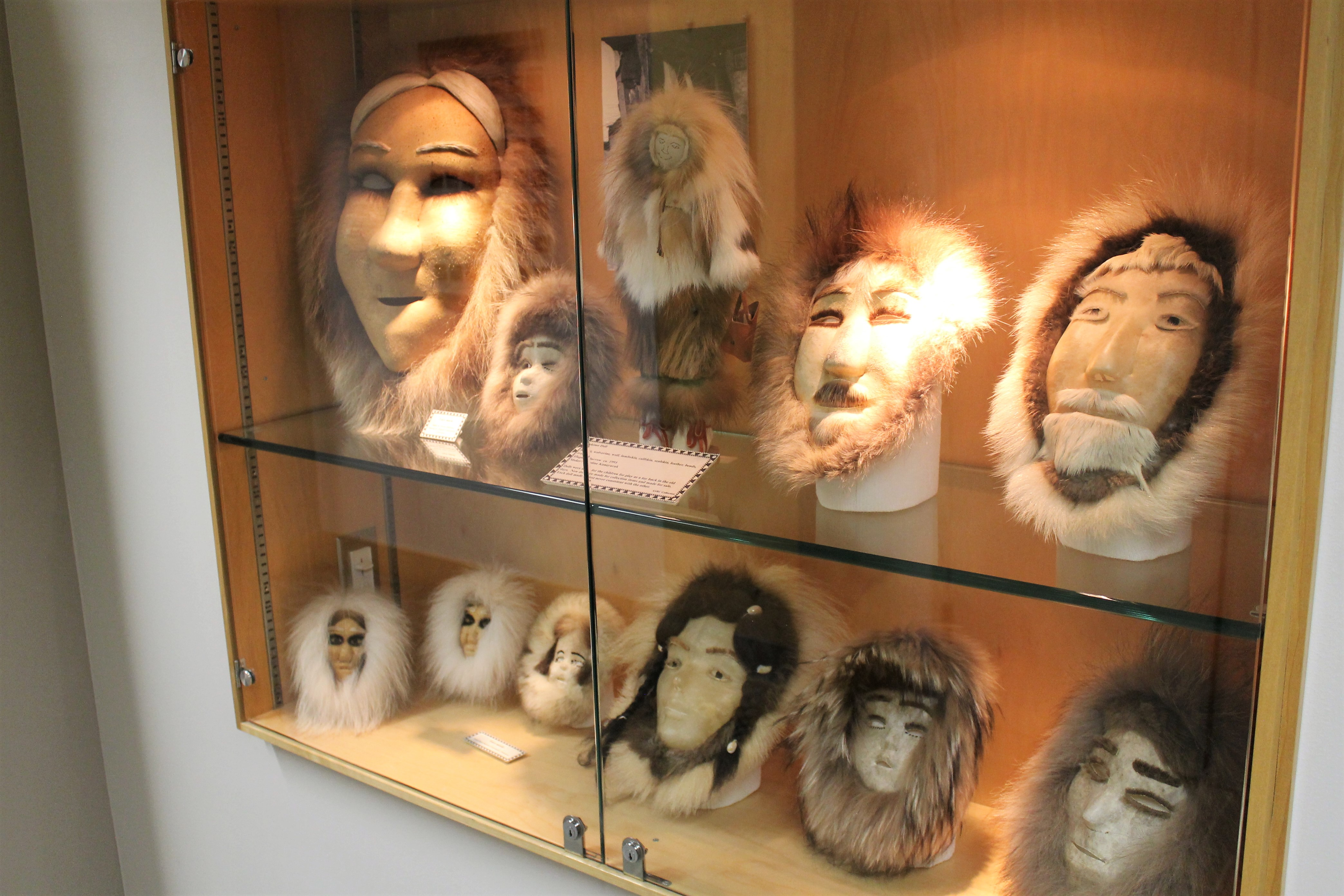
Masks on display at Iñupiat Heritage Center in Utqiaġvik

Some of Alaska's popular annual events are the Iditarod Trail Sled Dog Race from Anchorage to Nome, World Ice Art Championships in Fairbanks, the Blueberry Festival and Alaska Hummingbird Festival in Ketchikan, the Sitka Whale Fest, and the Stikine River Garnet Fest in Wrangell. The Stikine River attracts the largest springtime concentration of American bald eagles in the world.

The Alaska Native Heritage Center celebrates the rich heritage of Alaska's 11 cultural groups. Their purpose is to encourage cross-cultural exchanges among all people and enhance self-esteem among Native people. The Alaska Native Arts Foundation promotes and markets Native art from all regions and cultures in the State, using the internet.

=== Music ===
Influences on music in Alaska include the traditional music of Alaska Natives as well as folk music brought by later immigrants from Russia and Europe. Prominent musicians from Alaska include singer Jewel, traditional Aleut flautist Mary Youngblood, folk singer-songwriter Libby Roderick, Christian music singer-songwriter Lincoln Brewster, metal/post hardcore band 36 Crazyfists and the groups Pamyua and Portugal. The Man.

There are many established music festivals in Alaska, including the Alaska Folk Festival, the Fairbanks Summer Arts Festival, the Anchorage Folk Festival, the Athabascan Old-Time Fiddling Festival, the Sitka Jazz Festival, the Sitka Summer Music Festival, and the Anchorage Chamber Music Festival. The most prominent orchestra in Alaska is the Anchorage Symphony Orchestra, though the Fairbanks Symphony Orchestra and Juneau Symphony are also notable. The Anchorage Opera is currently the state's only professional opera company, though there are several volunteer and semi-professional organizations in the state as well.

The official state song of Alaska is "Alaska's Flag", which was adopted in 1955; it celebrates the flag of Alaska.

=== Film and television ===
The 1983 Disney movie Never Cry Wolf was at least partially shot in Alaska. The 1991 film White Fang, based on Jack London's 1906 novel and starring Ethan Hawke, was filmed in and around Haines. Steven Seagal's 1994 On Deadly Ground, starring Michael Caine, was filmed in part at the Worthington Glacier near Valdez.

Many reality television shows are filmed in Alaska. In 2011, the Anchorage Daily News found ten set in the state.

== Sports ==
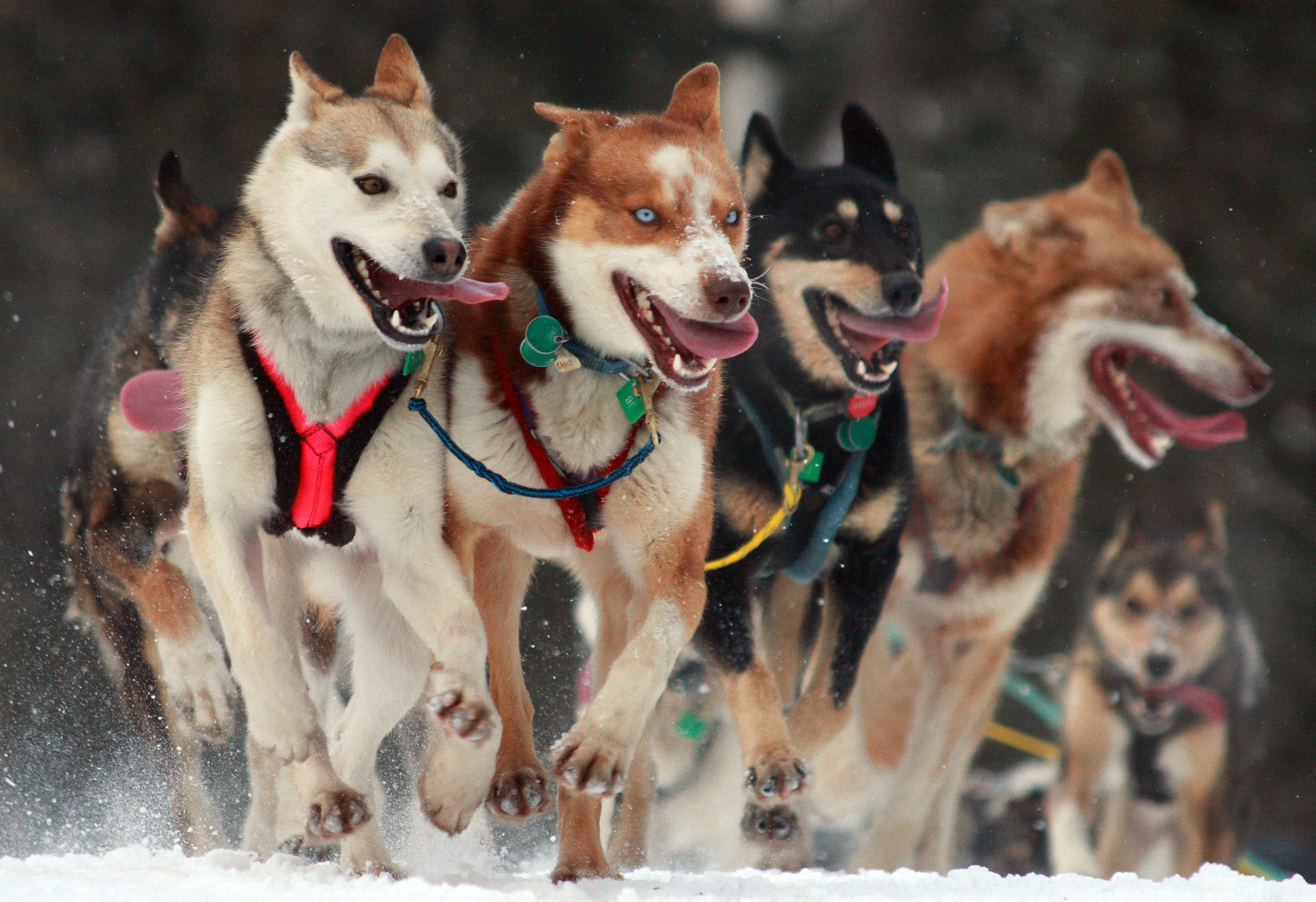
A dog team in the Iditarod Trail Sled Dog Race, arguably the most popular winter event in Alaska

The following is a list of sporting venues, events, and teams based in Alaska.

=== Anchorage ===
==== Venues ====
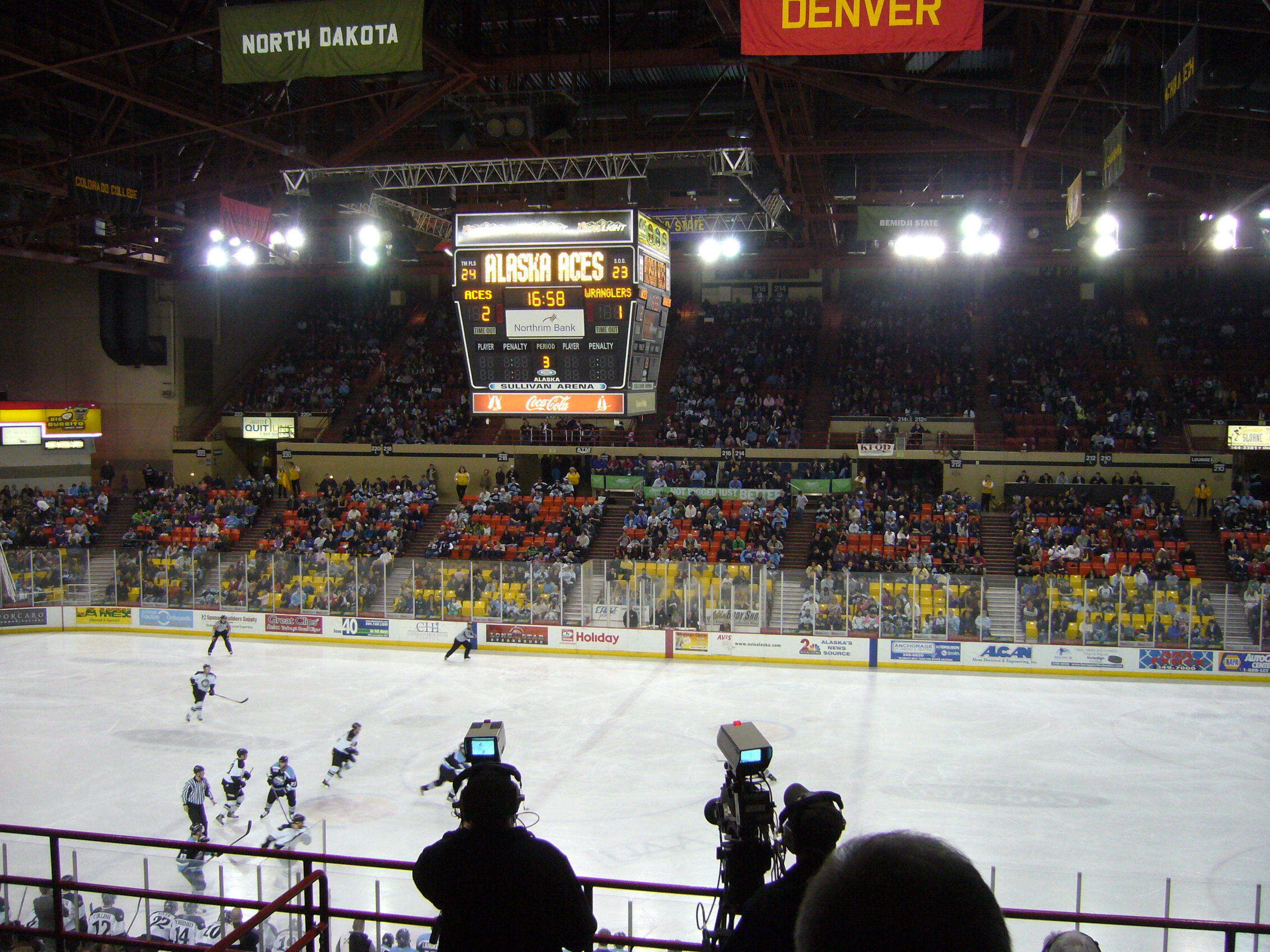
An Aces game at "The Sully"

- Alyeska Resort
- Chugach State Park, a 495,000-acre (2,000 km^{2}) high alpine park.
- Anchorage has many groomed cross-country skiing trails within the urban core. There are 105 miles (169 km) of maintained ski trails in the city, some of which reach downtown.
- Mulcahy Stadium
- Sullivan Arena
- Alaska Airlines Center

==== Teams ====
- Anchorage Wolverines
- Anchorage Bucs
- Anchorage Glacier Pilots
- Alaska-Anchorage Seawolves men's ice hockey
- Rage City Rollergirls
- Arctic Rush (soccer)
- Cook Inlet SC (soccer)
- Pioneer United FC (men's soccer)

==== Events ====
- Great Alaska Shootout, an annual NCAA Division I basketball tournament
- Sadler's Ultra Challenge wheelchair race between Fairbanks and Anchorage
- The Tour of Anchorage is an annual 50-kilometer (31-mile) ski race within the city.
- World Eskimo Indian Olympics

=== Fairbanks ===
==== Venues ====
- Carlson Center

==== Teams ====
- Alaska Goldpanners of Fairbanks
- Alaska Nanooks men's ice hockey
- Fairbanks Ice Dogs
- Fairbanks Rollergirls
- Fairbanks SC (soccer)

==== Events ====
- Sadler's Ultra Challenge wheelchair race between Fairbanks and Anchorage
- Sonot Kkaazoot
- World Eskimo Indian Olympics

=== Elsewhere ===
==== Teams ====
- MatSu United FC (men's soccer)
- Denali Destroyer Dolls
- Kenai River Brown Bears
- Mat-Su Miners
- Peninsula Oilers

==== Events ====
- Alaska Mountain Wilderness Classic
- Arctic Winter Games
- Mount Marathon Race
- World Extreme Skiing Championship

==== Dog mushing ====
- Iditarod Trail Sled Dog Race
- Iron Dog
- Junior Iditarod
- Kuskokwim 300
- Tustumena 200
- Yukon Quest

== Public health and safety ==
The Alaska State Troopers are Alaska's statewide police force. They have a long and storied history, but were not an official organization until 1941. Before the force was officially organized, law enforcement in Alaska was handled by various federal agencies. Larger towns usually have their own local police and some villages rely on "Public Safety Officers" who have police training but do not carry firearms. In much of the state, the troopers serve as the only police force available. In addition to enforcing traffic and criminal law, wildlife Troopers enforce hunting and fishing regulations. Due to the varied terrain and wide scope of the Troopers' duties, they employ a wide variety of land, air, and water patrol vehicles.

Many rural communities in Alaska are considered "dry", having outlawed the importation of alcoholic beverages. Suicide rates for rural residents are higher than urban rates.

Domestic abuse and other violent crimes are at high levels in Alaska. This is in part linked to alcohol abuse. Alaska has the highest rate of sexual assault in the nation, especially in rural areas. The average age of sexually assaulted victims is 16 years old. In four out of five cases, the suspects were relatives, friends, or acquaintances.

=== Health insurance ===
As of 2022, CVS Health and Premera account for 47% and 46% of private health insurance, respectively. Premera and Moda Health offer insurance on the federally-run Affordable Care Exchange.

=== Hospitals ===
Providence Alaska Medical Center in Anchorage is the largest hospital in the state as of 2021; Anchorage also hosts Alaska Regional Hospital and Alaska Native Medical Center.

Alaska's other major cities such as Fairbanks and Juneau also have local hospitals. In Southeast Alaska, Southeast Alaska Regional Health Consortium, runs healthcare facilities across 27 communities as of 2022, including hospitals in Sitka and Wrangell; although it originally served Native Americans only, it has expanded access and combined with other local facilities over time.

== Education ==
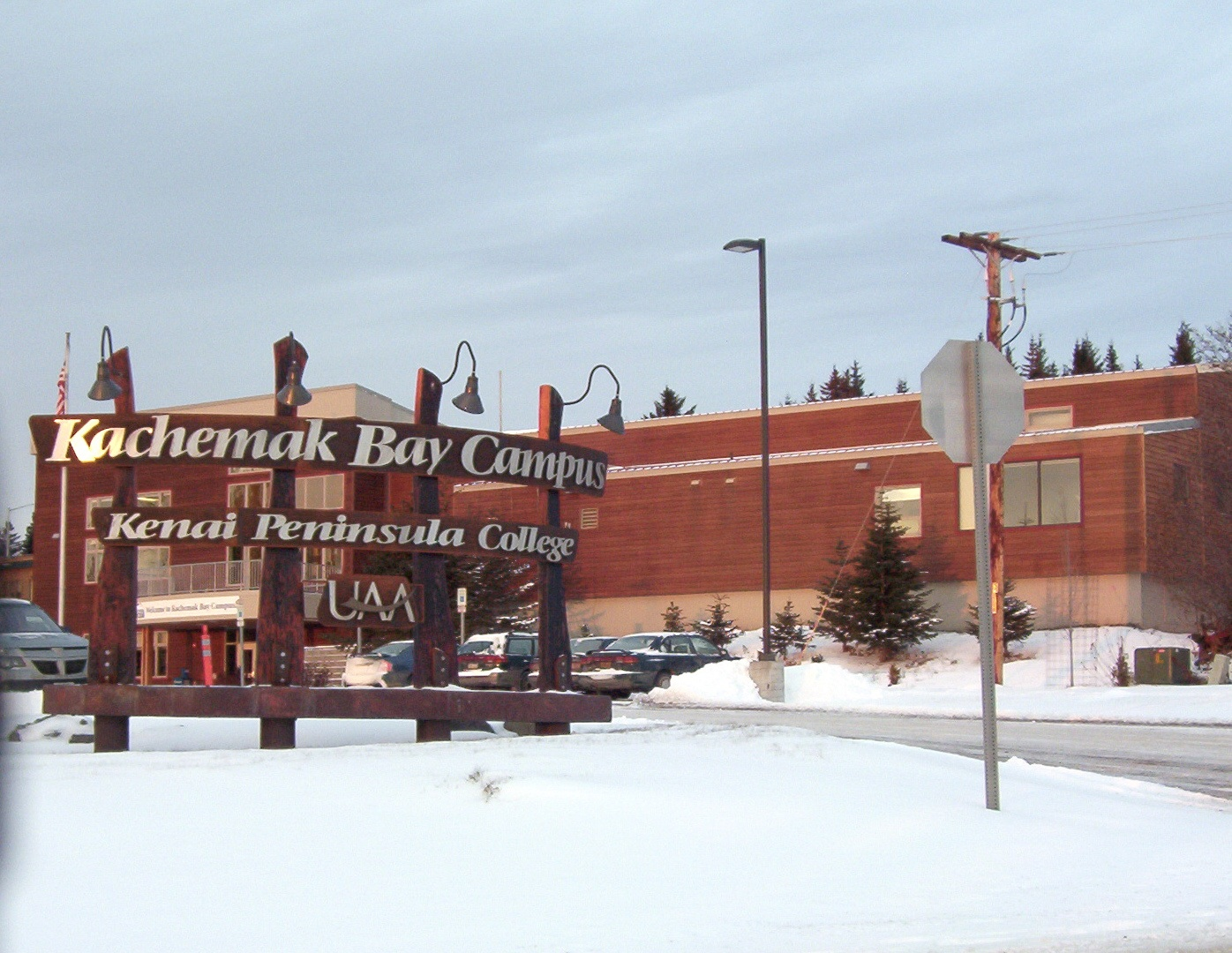
The Kachemak Bay Campus of the University of Alaska Anchorage, in downtown Homer

The Alaska Department of Education and Early Development administers many school districts in Alaska. In addition, the state operates a boarding school, Mt. Edgecumbe High School in Sitka, and provides partial funding for other boarding schools, including Nenana Student Living Center in Nenana and The Galena Interior Learning Academy in Galena.

There are more than a dozen colleges and universities in Alaska. Accredited universities in Alaska include the University of Alaska Anchorage, University of Alaska Fairbanks, University of Alaska Southeast, and Alaska Pacific University. Alaska is the only state that has no collegiate athletic programs that are members of NCAA Division I, although both Alaska-Fairbanks and Alaska-Anchorage maintain single sport membership in Division I for men's ice hockey.

The Alaska Department of Labor and Workforce Development operates AVTEC, Alaska's Institute of Technology. Campuses in Seward and Anchorage offer one-week to 11-month training programs in areas as diverse as Information Technology, Welding, Nursing, and Mechanics.

Alaska has had a problem with a "brain drain". Many of its young people, including most of the highest academic achievers, leave the state after high school graduation and do not return. As of 2013 Alaska did not have a law school or medical school. The University of Alaska has attempted to combat this by offering partial four-year scholarships to the top 10% of Alaska high school graduates, via the Alaska Scholars Program.

Beginning in 1998, schools in rural Alaska must have at least ten students to retain funding from the state, and campuses not meeting the number close. This was due to the loss in oil revenues that previously propped up smaller rural schools. In 2015, there was a proposal to raise that minimum to 25, but legislators in the state largely did not agree.

== Transportation ==
=== Road ===
Alaska has few road connections compared to the rest of the U.S. The state's road system, covering a relatively small area of the state, linking the central population centers and the Alaska Highway, the principal route out of the state through Canada. The state capital, Juneau, is not accessible by road, with access only by ferry or flight; this has spurred debate over decades about moving the capital to a city on the road system, or building a road connection from Haines. The western part of Alaska has no road system connecting the communities with the rest of Alaska.

The Interstate Highways in Alaska consists of a total of 1,082 miles (1,741 km). These are mostly not built to Interstate Highway standards and their status as such is largely notional. A unique feature of the Alaska Highway system is the Anton Anderson Memorial Tunnel, an active Alaska Railroad tunnel that provides a paved roadway link with the isolated community of Whittier on Prince William Sound to the Seward Highway about 50 miles (80 km) southeast of Anchorage at Portage. At 2.5 miles (4.0 km), the tunnel was the longest road tunnel in North America until 2007. The tunnel is the longest combination road and rail tunnel in North America.

Southwest Alaska is largely coastal, sparsely populated, and unconnected to the road system. Access to most communities in Southwest Alaska is primarily by air taxi, although larger towns like Kodiak, Bethel, King Salmon, Dillingham, and Dutch Harbor are accessible by scheduled air service. Some coastal communities can be reached via the Alaska Marine Highway ferry.

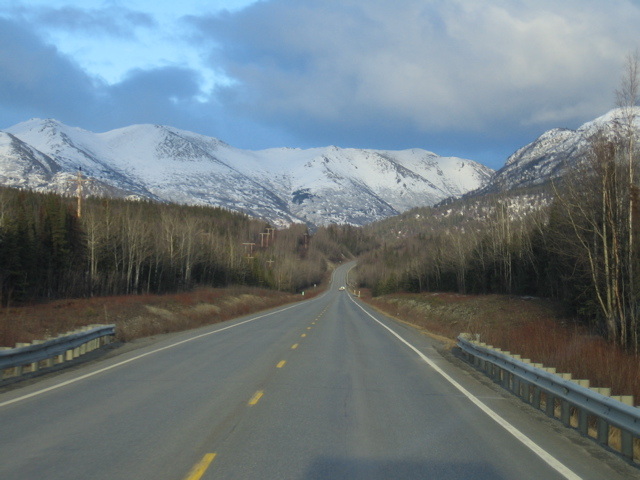
The Sterling Highway, near its intersection with the Seward Highway

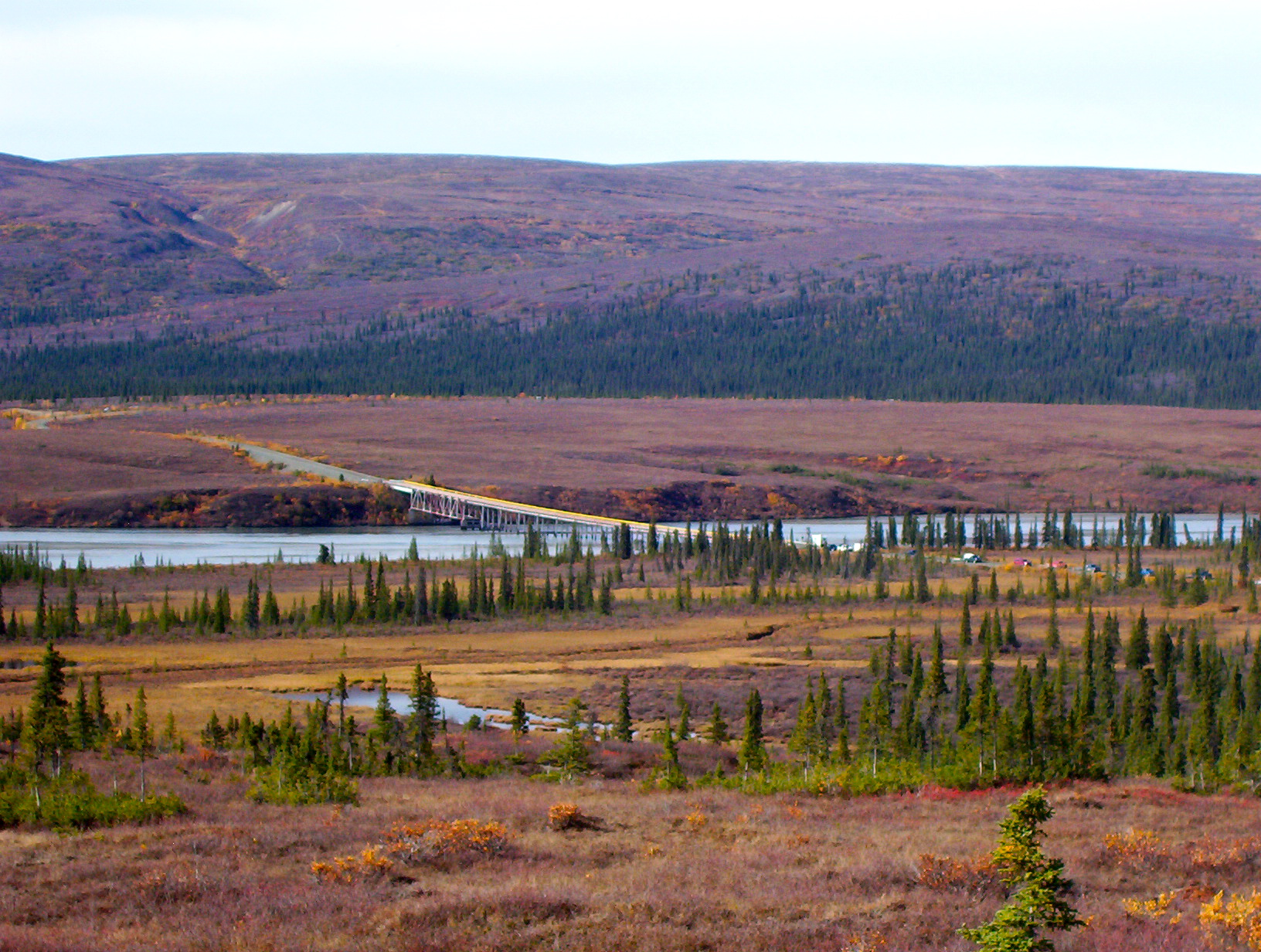
The Susitna River bridge on the Denali Highway is 1,036 feet (316 m) long.

Alaska Interstate Highways

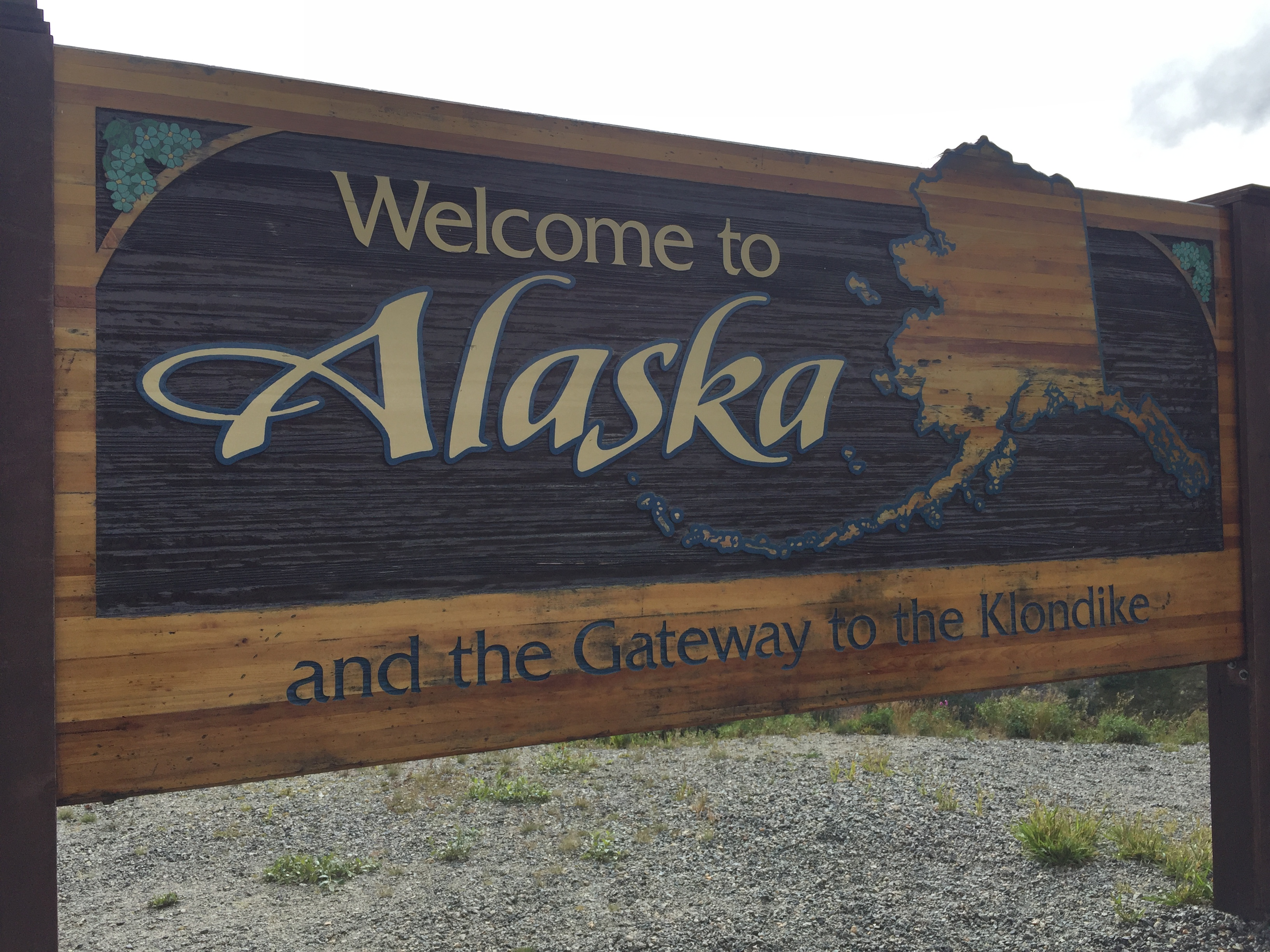
Alaska welcome sign on the Klondike Highway

=== Rail ===
Built around 1915, the Alaska Railroad (ARR) played a key role in the development of Alaska through the 20th century. It links shipping lanes on the North Pacific with Interior Alaska with tracks that run from Seward by way of South Central Alaska, passing through Anchorage, Eklutna, Wasilla, Talkeetna, Denali, and Fairbanks, with spurs to Whittier, Palmer and North Pole. The cities, towns, villages, and region served by ARR tracks are known statewide as "The Railbelt". In recent years, the ever-improving paved highway system began to eclipse the railroad's importance in Alaska's economy.

The railroad played a vital role in Alaska's development, moving freight into Alaska while transporting natural resources southward, such as coal from the Usibelli coal mine near Healy to Seward and gravel from the Matanuska Valley to Anchorage. It is well known for its summertime tour passenger service.

The Alaska Railroad was one of the last railroads in North America to use cabooses in regular service and still uses them on some gravel trains. It continues to offer one of the last flag stop routes in the country. A stretch of about 60 miles (100 km) of track along an area north of Talkeetna remains inaccessible by road; the railroad provides the only transportation to rural homes and cabins in the area. Until construction of the Parks Highway in the 1970s, the railroad provided the only land access to most of the region along its entire route.

In northern Southeast Alaska, the White Pass and Yukon Route also partly runs through the state from Skagway northwards into Canada (British Columbia and Yukon Territory), crossing the border at White Pass Summit. This line is now mainly used by tourists, often arriving by cruise liner at Skagway. It was featured in the 1983 BBC television series Great Little Railways.

These two railroads are connected neither to each other nor any other railroad. The nearest link to the North American railway network is the northwest terminus of the Canadian National Railway at Prince Rupert, British Columbia, several hundred miles to the southeast. In 2000, the U.S. Congress authorized $6 million to study the feasibility of a rail link between Alaska, Canada, and the lower 48. As of 2021 the Alaska-Alberta Railway Development Corporation is in receivership.

Some private companies provide car float service between Whittier and Seattle.

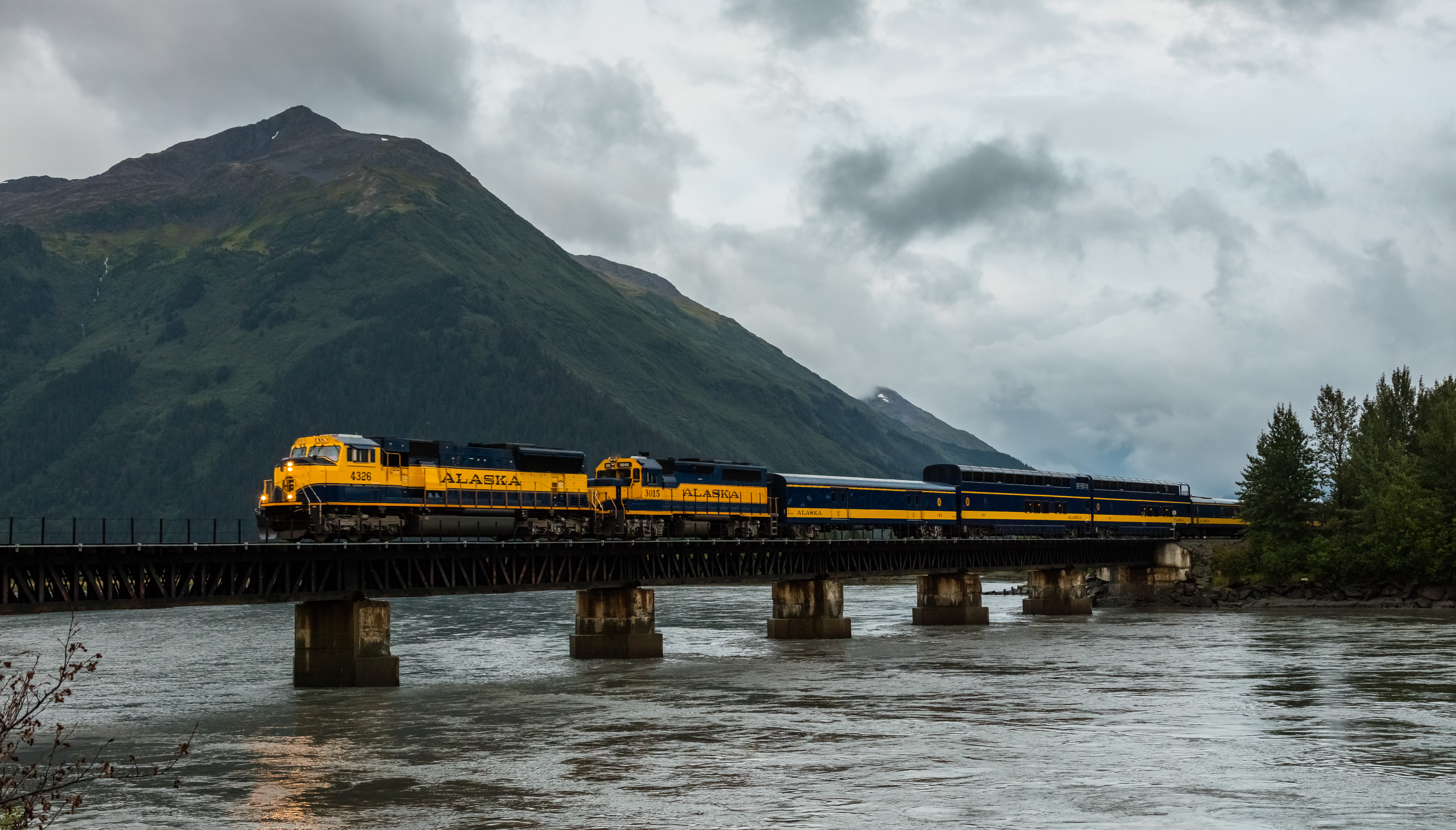
An Alaska Railroad locomotive over a bridge in Girdwood approaching Anchorage (2017)

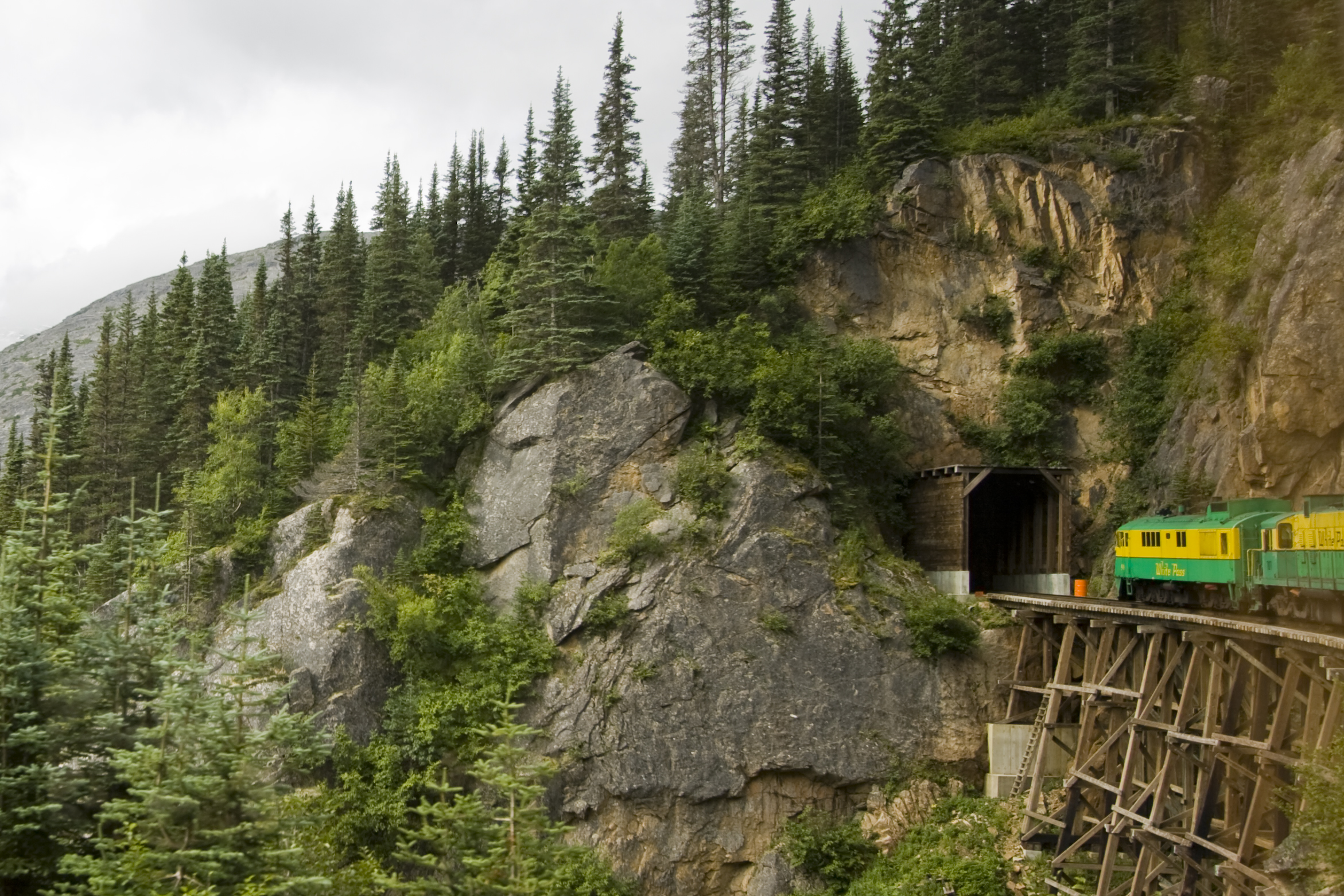
The White Pass and Yukon Route traverses rugged terrain north of Skagway near the Canada–US border.

=== Sea ===
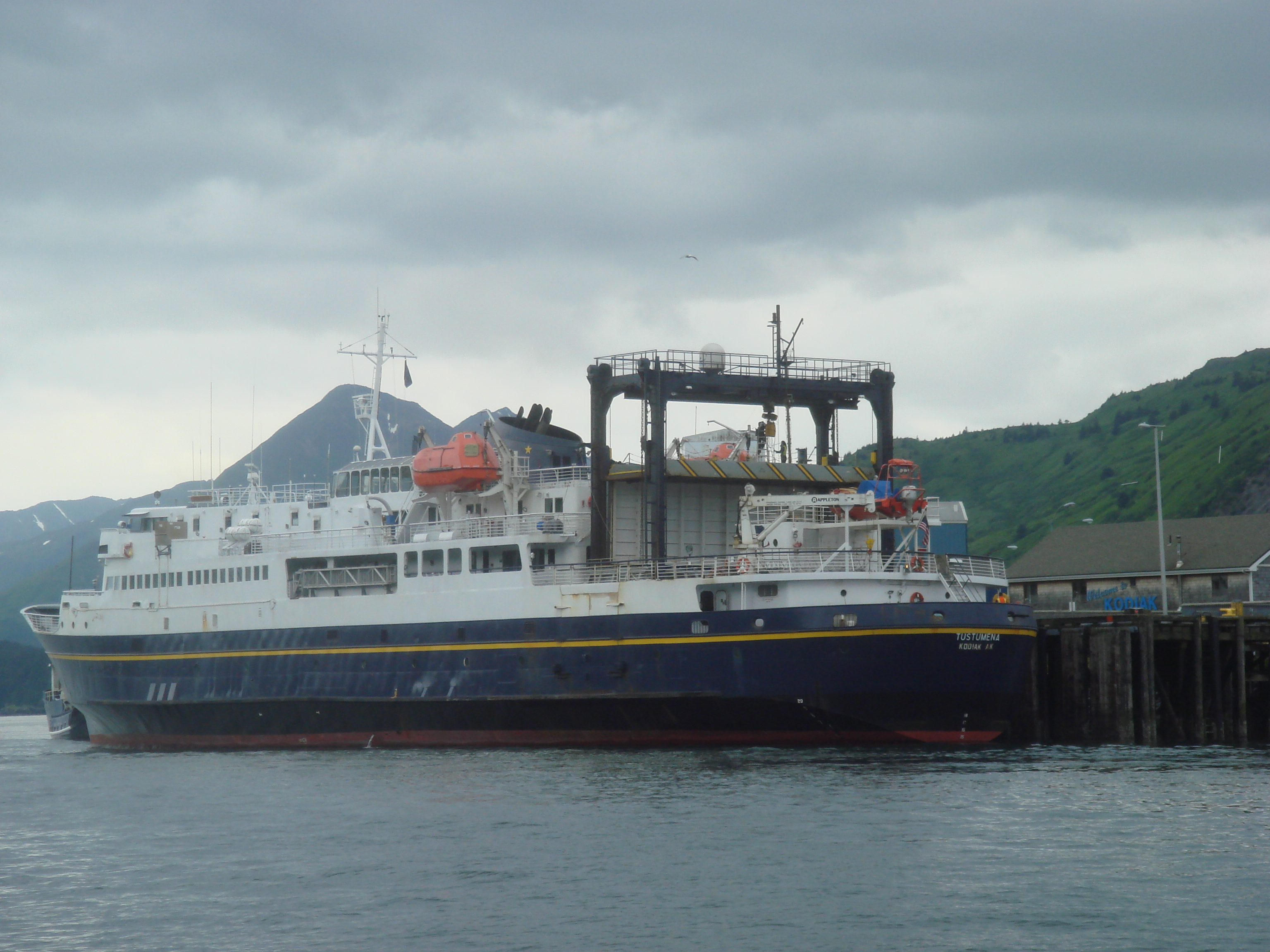
The MV Tustumena (named after Tustumena Glacier) is one of the state's many ferries, providing service to the Kenai Peninsula, Kodiak Island and the Aleutian Chain.

Many cities, towns, and villages in Alaska don't have road or highway access. The only modes of access involve travel by air, river, or the sea.

Alaska's well-developed state-owned ferry system, known as the Alaska Marine Highway, serves the cities of southeast, the Gulf Coast and the Alaska Peninsula. The ferries transport vehicles and passengers. The system also operates a ferry service from Bellingham, Washington and Prince Rupert, British Columbia, in Canada through the Inside Passage to Skagway. The Inter-Island Ferry Authority also serves as an important marine link for many communities in the Prince of Wales Island region of Southeast and works in concert with the Alaska Marine Highway.

In recent years, cruise lines have created a summertime tourism market, mainly connecting the Pacific Northwest to Southeast Alaska and, to a lesser degree, towns along Alaska's gulf coast. The population of Ketchikan for example fluctuates dramatically on many days—up to four large cruise ships can dock there at the same time.

=== Air ===
Cities not served by road, sea, or river can be reached only by air, foot, dogsled, or snowmachine, accounting for Alaska's extremely well developed bush air services—an Alaskan novelty. Anchorage, and to a lesser extent Fairbanks, is served by many major airlines. Because of limited highway access, air travel remains the most efficient form of transportation in and out of the state. Anchorage recently completed extensive remodeling and construction at Ted Stevens Anchorage International Airport to help accommodate the upsurge in tourism. In 2012–2013, Alaska received almost two million visitors.

Making regular flights to most villages and towns within the state commercially viable is difficult, so they are heavily subsidized by the federal government through the Essential Air Service program. Alaska Airlines is the only major airline offering in-state travel with jet service (sometimes in combination cargo and passenger Boeing 737-400s) from Anchorage and Fairbanks to regional hubs like Bethel, Nome, Kotzebue, Dillingham, Kodiak, and other larger communities as well as to major Southeast and Alaska Peninsula communities.

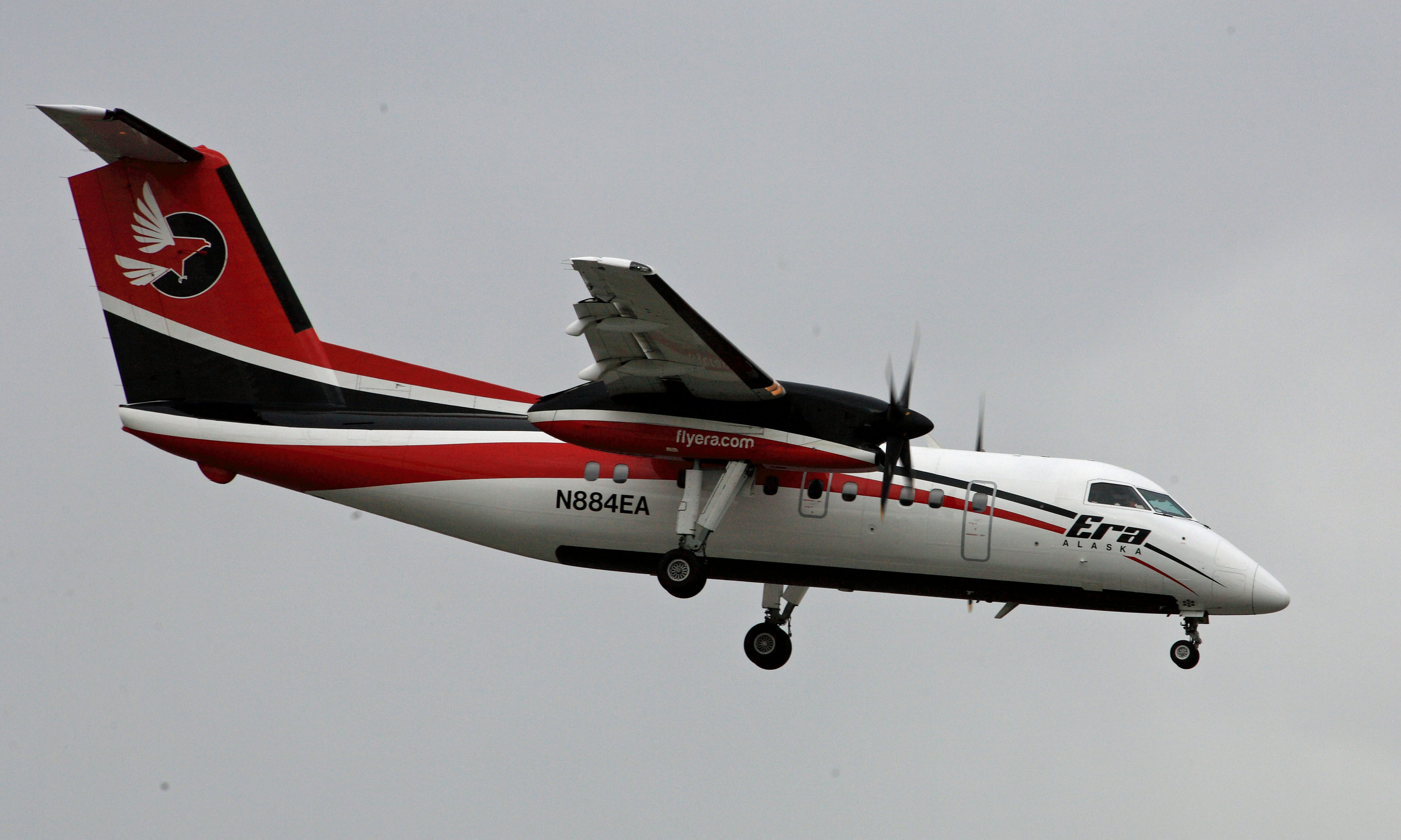
A Bombardier Dash 8, operated by Era Alaska, on approach to Ted Stevens Anchorage International Airport

The bulk of remaining commercial flight offerings come from small regional commuter airlines such as Ravn Alaska, PenAir, and Frontier Flying Service. The smallest towns and villages must rely on scheduled or chartered bush flying services using general aviation aircraft such as the Cessna Caravan, the most popular aircraft in use in the state. Much of this service can be attributed to the Alaska bypass mail program which subsidizes bulk mail delivery to Alaskan rural communities. The program requires 70% of that subsidy to go to carriers who offer passenger service to the communities.

Many communities have small air taxi services. These operations originated from the demand for customized transport to remote areas. Perhaps the most quintessentially Alaskan plane is the bush seaplane. The world's busiest seaplane base is Lake Hood, located next to Ted Stevens Anchorage International Airport, where flights bound for remote villages without an airstrip carry passengers, cargo, and many items from stores and warehouse clubs.

In 2006, Alaska had the highest number of pilots per capita of any U.S. state. In Alaska there are 8,795 active pilot certificates as of 2020.

=== Snow ===
Another Alaskan transportation method is the dogsled. In modern times, that is, any time after the mid- to late‑1920s, dog mushing is more of a sport than a true means of transportation. Races are held around the state, but the best known is the Iditarod Trail Sled Dog Race, a 1,150-mile (1,850 km) trail from Anchorage to Nome, although the distance varies from year to year, the official distance is set at 1,049 miles or 1,688 km.

The race commemorates the famous 1925 serum run to Nome in which mushers and dogs like Togo and Balto took much-needed medicine to the diphtheria-stricken community of Nome when all other means of transportation had failed. Mushers from all over the world come to Anchorage each March to compete for cash, prizes, and prestige. The "Serum Run" is another sled dog race that more accurately follows the route of the famous 1925 relay, leaving from the community of Nenana, southwest of Fairbanks, to Nome.

In areas not served by road or rail, primary transportation in summer is by fourwheeler and in winter by snowmachine.

== Communication ==
Alaska's internet and other data transport systems are provided largely through the two major telecommunications companies: GCI and Alaska Communications. GCI owns and operates what it calls the Alaska United Fiber Optic system. As of late 2011, Alaska Communications had two fiber optic paths to the lower 48 and two more across Alaska. In January 2011, it was reported that a $1 billion project to connect Asia and rural Alaska was being planned, aided in part by $350 million in stimulus from the federal government.

== Law and government ==
=== State government ===
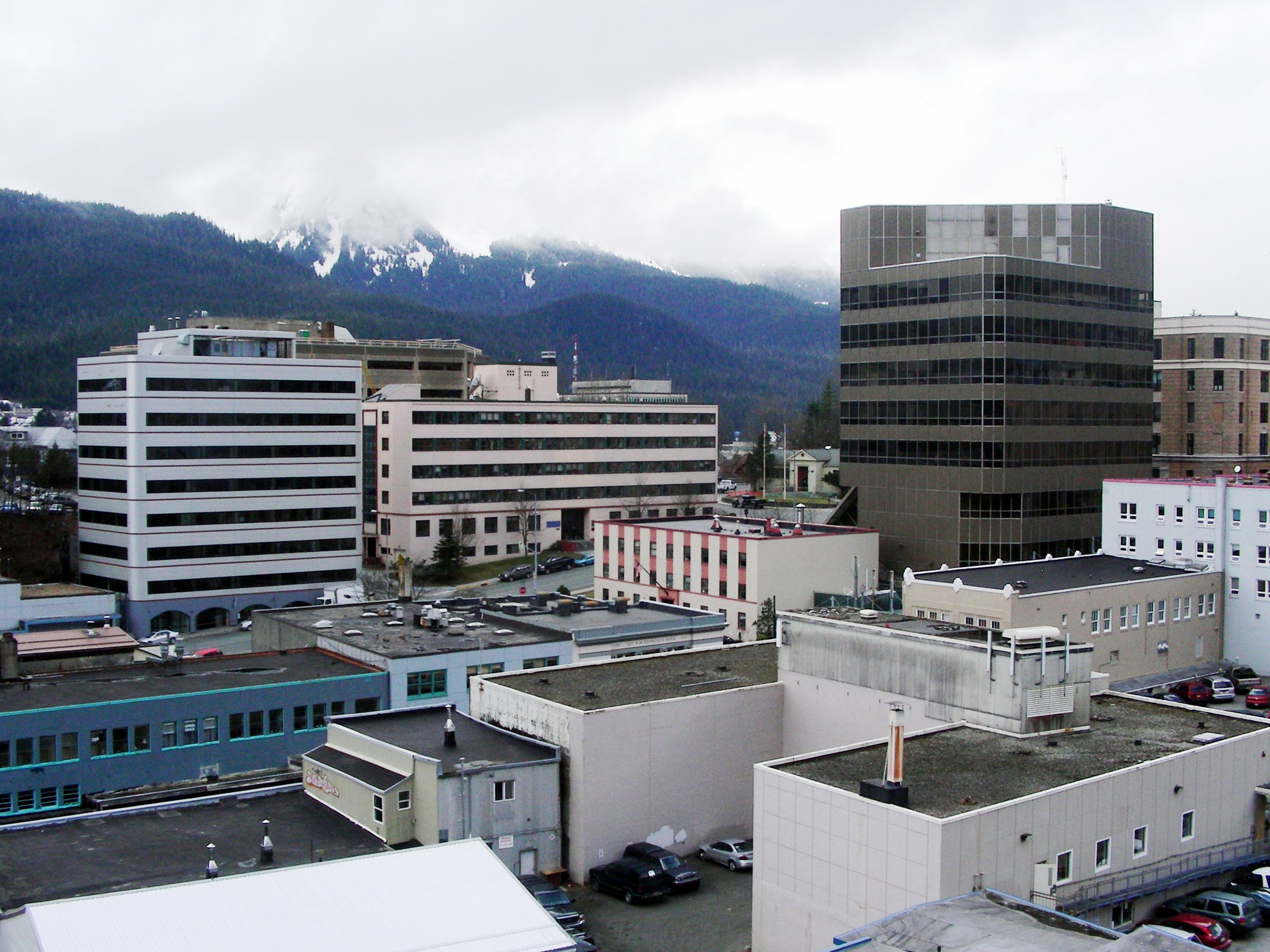
The center of state government in Juneau. The large buildings in the background are, from left to right: the Court Plaza Building (known colloquially as the "Spam Can"), the State Office Building (behind), the Alaska Office Building, the John H. Dimond State Courthouse, and the Alaska State Capitol. Many of the smaller buildings in the foreground are also occupied by state government agencies.

Like all other U.S. states, Alaska is governed as a republic, with three branches of government: an executive branch consisting of the governor of Alaska and their appointees which head executive departments; a legislative branch consisting of the Alaska House of Representatives and Alaska Senate; and a judicial branch consisting of the Alaska Supreme Court and lower courts.

The state of Alaska employs approximately 16,000 people statewide.

The Alaska State Legislature consists of a 40-member House of Representatives and a 20-member Senate. Senators serve four-year terms and House members two. The governor of Alaska serves four-year terms. The lieutenant governor runs separately from the governor in the primaries, but during the general election, the nominee for governor and nominee for lieutenant governor run together on the same ticket.

Alaska's court system has four levels: the Alaska Supreme Court, the Alaska Court of Appeals, the Superior Court and the district courts. The superior and district courts are trial courts. Superior courts are courts of general jurisdiction, while district courts hear only certain types of cases, including misdemeanor criminal cases and civil cases valued up to $100,000.

The Supreme Court and the Court of Appeals are appellate courts. The Court of Appeals is required to hear appeals from certain lower-court decisions, including those regarding criminal prosecutions, juvenile delinquency, and habeas corpus. The Supreme Court hears civil appeals and may in its discretion hear criminal appeals.

=== State politics ===
Gubernatorial election results
Year	Democratic	Republican	Others
1958	59.6% 29,189	39.4% 19,299	
1962	52.3% 29,627	47.7% 27,054	
1966	48.4% 32,065	50.0% 33,145	
1970	52.4% 42,309	46.1% 37,264	
1974	47.4% 45,553	47.7% 45,840	
1978	20.2% 25,656	39.1% 49,580	
1982	46.1% 89,918	37.1% 72,291	
1986	47.3% 84,943	42.6% 76,515	
1990	30.9% 60,201	26.2% 50,991	38.9% 75,721 (Note: Wally Hickel would rejoin the Republican party after winning the election as a member of the Alaskan Independence Party.)
1994	41.1% 87,693	40.8% 87,157	
1998	51.3% 112,879	17.9% 39,331	
2002	40.7% 94,216	55.9% 129,279	
2006	41.0% 97,238	48.3% 114,697	
2010	37.7% 96,519	59.1% 151,318	
2014	0.0% 0	45.9% 128,435	48.1% 134,658 (Note: Byron Mallott, the Democratic gubernatorial nominee, suspended his campaign and became the running mate of Bill Walker, an independent who left the Republican Party. They won the election with 48.1% or 134,658 votes.)
2018	44.4% 125,739	51.4% 145,631	
2022	24.2% 63,755	50.3% 132,392	

Although in its early years of statehood Alaska was a Democratic state, since the early 1970s it has been characterized as Republican-leaning. Local political communities have often worked on issues related to land use development, fishing, tourism, and individual rights. Alaska Natives, while organized in and around their communities, have been active within the Native corporations. These have been given ownership over large tracts of land, which require stewardship.

Alaska was formerly the only state in which possession of one ounce or less of marijuana in one's home was completely legal under state law, though the federal law remains in force.

The state has an independence movement favoring a vote on secession from the United States, with the Alaskan Independence Party.

Six Republicans and four Democrats have served as governor of Alaska. Republican governor Wally Hickel was elected to the office for a second term in 1990 after leaving the Republican party and briefly joining the Alaskan Independence Party ticket just long enough to be reelected. He rejoined the Republican party in 1994.

Alaska's voter initiative making marijuana legal took effect in February 2015, placing Alaska alongside Colorado and Washington, as well as Washington D.C., as the first three U.S. states where recreational marijuana is legal. The law means people over 21 can consume small amounts of cannabis. The first legal marijuana store opened in Valdez in October 2016.

=== Voter registration ===
Party registration as of June 3, 2024
Party	Total voters	Percentage
Unaffiliated	346,751	58.35%
Republican	143,401	24.13%
Democratic	73,598	12.38%
Alaskan Independence	18,768	3.16%
Minor parties	11,758	1.98%
Total	594,276	100.00%

=== Taxes ===
To finance state government operations, Alaska depends primarily on petroleum revenues and federal subsidies. This allows it to have the lowest individual tax burden in the United States. It is one of five states with no sales tax, one of seven states with no individual income tax, and—along with New Hampshire—one of two that has neither. The Department of Revenue Tax Division reports regularly on the state's revenue sources. The department issues an annual summary of its operations, including new state laws that directly affect the tax division. In 2014, the Tax Foundation ranked Alaska as having the fourth most "business friendly" tax policy, behind only Wyoming, South Dakota, and Nevada.

89 municipalities collect a local sales tax, from 1.0 to 7.5%, typically 3–5%. Other local taxes levied include raw fish taxes, hotel, motel, and bed-and-breakfast 'bed' taxes, severance taxes, liquor and tobacco taxes, gaming (pull tabs) taxes, tire taxes and fuel transfer taxes. A part of the revenue collected from certain state taxes and license fees, such as petroleum, aviation motor fuel, telephone cooperative, is shared with municipalities in Alaska.

The fall in oil prices after the fracking boom in the early 2010s has decimated Alaska's state treasury, which has historically received about 85 percent of its revenue from taxes and fees imposed on oil and gas companies. The state government has had to drastically reduce its budget, and has brought its budget shortfall from over $2 billion in 2016 to under $500 million by 2018. In 2020, Alaska's state government budget was $4.8 billion, while projected government revenues were only $4.5 billion.

=== Federal politics ===
A line graph showing the presidential vote by party from 1960 to 2020 in Alaska

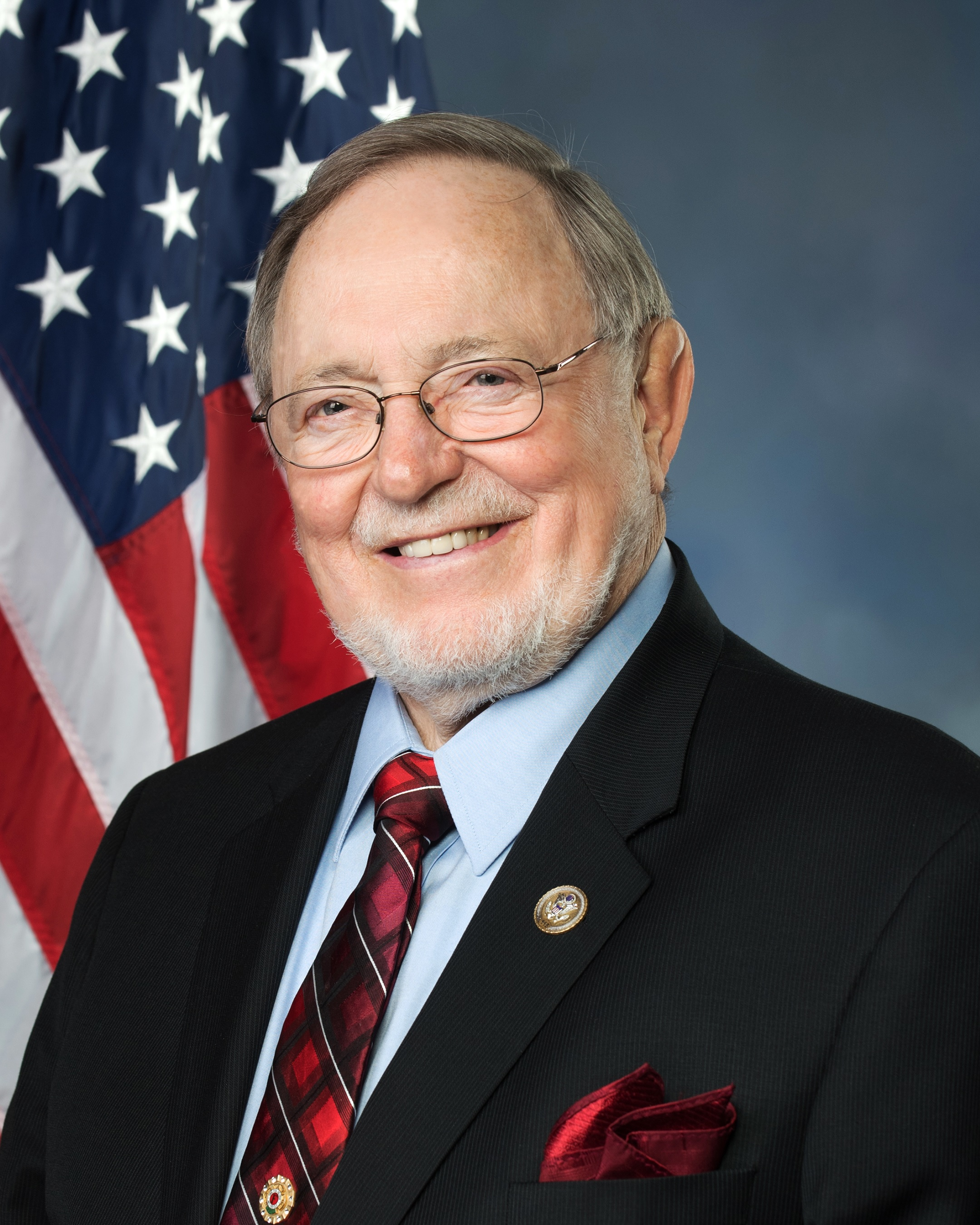
Republican Don Young held Alaska's sole U.S. House seat for 49 years, from 1973 to 2022.

Alaska regularly supports Republicans in presidential elections and has done so since statehood. Republicans have won the state's electoral college votes in all but one election that it has participated in (1964). No state has voted for a Democratic presidential candidate fewer times. Alaska was carried by Democratic nominee Lyndon B. Johnson during his landslide election in 1964, while the 1960 and 1968 elections were close. Since 1972, Republicans have carried the state by large margins.

In 2008, Republican John McCain defeated Democrat Barack Obama in Alaska, 59.49% to 37.83%. McCain's running mate was Sarah Palin, the state's governor and the first Alaskan on a major party ticket. Obama lost Alaska again in 2012, but he captured 40% of the state's vote in that election, making him the first Democrat to do so since 1968. In 2020, Joe Biden received 42.77% of the vote for president, marking the high point for a Democratic presidential candidate since Johnson's 1964 victory.

The Alaska Bush, central Juneau, midtown and downtown Anchorage, and the areas surrounding the University of Alaska Fairbanks campus and Ester have been strongholds of the Democratic Party. The Matanuska-Susitna Borough, the Kenai Peninsula, the majority of Fairbanks (including North Pole and the military base), and South Anchorage typically have the strongest Republican showing.

=== Elections ===
Alaska has a history of primary defeats for incumbent U.S. Senators, including Ernest Gruening, Mike Gravel, and Lisa Murkowski. However, Murkowski won re-election with a write-in campaign. Despite this, Alaska has also seen long-serving members of Congress, such as Ted Stevens, who served as a U.S. Senator for 40 years, and Don Young, who held Alaska's sole U.S. House seat for 49 years, from 1973 to 2022.

In the 2020 election cycle, Alaskan voters approved Ballot Measure 2. The measure passed by a margin of 1.1%, or about 4,000 votes. The measure requires campaigns to disclose the original source and any intermediaries for campaign contributions over $2,000. The measure also establishes non-partisan primaries, sometimes called jungle primaries, for statewide elections (like in Washington state and California) and ranked-choice voting, like in Maine. Measure 2 makes Alaska the third state with nonpartisan primaries for all statewide races, the second state with ranked choice voting, and the only state with both.

The 2022 special election to fill Alaska's only U.S. House seat, left vacant by the death of Don Young, was won by Mary Peltola. She became the first Democrat to win the House seat since 1972 and the first Alaskan Native elected to the United States Congress in history. After winning a full term in the 2022 general election, Peltola lost reelection in 2024 to Republican Nick Begich III.

Political leadership of Alaska
Governor	Senior U.S. Senator	Junior U.S. Senator
Mike Dunleavy	Lisa Murkowski	Dan Sullivan
Assumed office December 3, 2018	Assumed office December 20, 2002	Assumed office January 3, 2015
Republican Party	Republican Party	Republican Party

== See also ==
- Bibliography of the history of Alaska
- Index of Alaska-related articles
- Outline of Alaska
- List of boroughs and census areas in Alaska
- USS Alaska (four different ships)

== Notes ==
Preceded by Arizona	List of U.S. states by date of admission to the Union; Admitted on January 3, 1959 (49th)	Succeeded by Hawaii
