= List of places in Alaska (D) =

This is a list of cities, towns, unincorporated communities, counties, and other recognized places in the U.S. state of Alaska. It also includes information on the number and names of counties in which the area or place lies, and its lower and upper zip code bounds, if applicable.

Name of place	Number of counties	Principal county	Lower zip code	Upper zip code
Dahl	1	Nome Census Area		
Dairy	1	Ketchikan Gateway Borough		
Davidsons Landing	1	Nome Census Area		
Deadhorse	1	North Slope Borough	99734	
Deadhorse Airport	1	North Slope Borough	99740	
DeBarr Vista	1	Municipality of Anchorage		
Deering	1	Northwest Arctic Borough	99736	
Delta-Greely Regional Educational Attendance Area	1	Southeast Fairbanks Census Area		
Delta Junction	1	Southeast Fairbanks Census Area	99737	
Deltana	1	Southeast Fairbanks Census Area		
Denali	1	Denali Borough		
Denali Borough School District	1	Denali Borough		
Denali National Park	2	Matanuska-Susitna Borough	99755	
Denali National Park	2	Yukon-Koyukuk Census Area	99755	
Denali Park	1	Yukon-Koyukuk Census Area	99755	
Dennis Manor	1	Fairbanks North Star Borough		
Derby Tract	1	Fairbanks North Star Borough	99701	
Diamond	1	Denali Borough		
Diamond Ridge	1	Kenai Peninsula Borough		
Dillingham	1	Dillingham Census Area	99576	
Dillingham	1	Dillingham Census Area		
Dillingham Airport	1	Dillingham Census Area	99576	
Dillingham City School District	1	Dillingham Census Area		
Dime Landing	1	Nome Census Area		
Diomede	1	Nome Census Area	99762	
Discovery	1	Yukon-Koyukuk Census Area		
Divide	1	Kenai Peninsula Borough		
Dobson Landing	1	City and Borough of Juneau		
Dogpatch	1	Fairbanks North Star Borough		
Dolomi	1	Prince of Wales-Outer Census Area		
Dome	1	Fairbanks North Star Borough		
Donnelly	1	Southeast Fairbanks Census Area	99737	
Dora Bay	1	Prince of Wales-Outer Census Area		
Dot Lake	1	Southeast Fairbanks Census Area	99737	
Dot Lake Village	1	Southeast Fairbanks Census Area		
Douglas	1	City and Borough of Juneau	99824	
Downtown	1	Municipality of Anchorage	99501	
Downtown	1	Fairbanks North Star Borough	99707	
Doyon	4	Fairbanks North Star Borough		
Doyon	4	Matanuska-Susitna Borough		
Doyon	4	Southeast Fairbanks Census Area		
Doyon	4	Yukon-Koyukuk Census Area		
Dry Creek	1	Southeast Fairbanks Census Area		
Dunbar	1	Yukon-Koyukuk Census Area		
Duncan Canal	1	Wrangell-Petersburg Census Area	99833	
Dutch Harbor	1	Aleutians West Census Area	99692	
Dutch Harbor Airport	1	Aleutians West Census Area	99685	
Dyea	1	Municipality of Skagway Borough		
