= Charlieskin Village, Alaska =

Unincorporated community in Alaska, United States

Charlieskin Village
- Unincorporated community
- Location within the state of Alaska
- Coordinates: 62°58′14″N 141°49′12″W
- Country: United States
- State: Alaska
- Census area: Southeast Fairbanks

Government
  - State senator: Click Bishop (R)
  - State rep.: Dave Talerico (R)
- Elevation: 1,696 ft (517 m)
- Time zone: UTC-9 (Alaska (AKST))
  - Summer (DST): UTC-8 (AKDT)
- GNIS feature ID: 1400164

Charlieskin Village is an unincorporated community in Southeast Fairbanks Census Area, Alaska, United States. Its elevation is 1,696 feet (517 m). The community lies along Charlieskin Creek, 5.5 miles (8.8 km) south of Northway Junction, near Kathakne. The village site is now within Northway CDP. As of 2019, there are no longer any buildings at the location on aerial maps. It has never reported a population on the census.
