= List of places in Alaska (C) =

This list of cities, towns, unincorporated communities, counties, and other recognized places in the U.S. state of Alaska also includes information on the number and names of counties in which the place lies, and its lower and upper zip code bounds, if applicable.

Name of place	Number of counties	Principal county	Lower zip code	Upper zip code
Calista	2	Bethel Census Area		
Calista	2	Kusilvak Census Area		
Campbell	1	Municipality of Anchorage	99503	
Campbell	1	Prince of Wales-Outer Census Area	99901	
Campion Station	1	Yukon-Koyukuk Census Area	99741	
Candle	1	Northwest Arctic Borough	99752	
Cannery	1	Skagway-Hoonah-Angoon Census Area		
Cantwell	1	Denali Borough	99729	
Canyon	1	Matanuska-Susitna Borough		
Canyon Village	1	Yukon-Koyukuk Census Area		
Cape Krusenstern National Monument	1	Northwest Arctic Borough		
Cape Lisburne	1	North Slope Borough	99766	
Cape Newenham	1	Bethel Census Area	99651	
Cape Nome	1	Nome Census Area		
Cape Pole	1	Prince of Wales-Outer Census Area	99901	
Cape Romanzof	1	Kusilvak Census Area	99604	
Cape Sarichef Radio Relay Site	1	Aleutians East Borough	99685	
Cape Yakataga	1	Valdez-Cordova Census Area	99574	
Cape York	1	Nome Census Area		
Carlanna	1	Ketchikan Gateway Borough	99901	
Carlo	1	Yukon-Koyukuk Census Area		
Caro	1	Yukon-Koyukuk Census Area		
Casco Cove Coast Guard Station	1	Aleutians West Census Area		
Caswell	1	Matanuska-Susitna Borough		
Central	1	Yukon-Koyukuk Census Area	99730	
Chakaktolik	1	Kusilvak Census Area		
Chalkyitsik	1	Yukon-Koyukuk Census Area	99788	
Chandalar	1	Yukon-Koyukuk Census Area		
Chaniliut	1	Kusilvak Census Area		
Charcoal Point	1	Ketchikan Gateway Borough	99901	
Chariot	1	North Slope Borough		
Charlieskin Village	1	Southeast Fairbanks Census Area		
Chase	1	Matanuska-Susitna Borough	99676	
Chatanika	1	Fairbanks North Star Borough	99701	
Chatham	1	City and Borough of Sitka	99801	
Chatham Regional Educational Attendance Area	2	Skagway-Hoonah-Angoon Census Area		
Chatham Regional Educational Attendance Area	2	Wrangell-Petersburg Census Area		
Chefornak	1	Bethel Census Area	99561	
Chelatna Lodge	1	Matanuska-Susitna Borough		
Chena	1	Fairbanks North Star Borough		
Chena Hot Springs	1	Fairbanks North Star Borough	99701	
Chena Ridge	1	Fairbanks North Star Borough		
Chenega	1	Valdez-Cordova Census Area		
Chenega Bay	1	Valdez-Cordova Census Area		
Chenik	1	Kenai Peninsula Borough		
Chernofski	1	Aleutians West Census Area	99685	
Chevak	1	Kusilvak Census Area	99563	
Chicagof Creek	1	Northwest Arctic Borough		
Chichagof	1	City and Borough of Sitka		
Chickaloon	1	Matanuska-Susitna Borough	99674	
Chickaloon	1	Matanuska-Susitna Borough		
Chicken	1	Southeast Fairbanks Census Area	99732	
Chignik	1	Lake and Peninsula Borough	99564	
Chignik Lagoon	1	Lake and Peninsula Borough	99565	
Chignik Lake	1	Lake and Peninsula Borough	99548	
Chignik Lake	1	Lake and Peninsula Borough	99564	
Chilkat	1	Skagway-Hoonah-Angoon Census Area	99827	
Chilkoot	1	Haines Borough		
Chiniak	1	Kodiak Island Borough	99615	
Chisana	1	Valdez-Cordova Census Area	99566	
Chistochina	1	Valdez-Cordova Census Area	99586	
Chitina	1	Valdez-Cordova Census Area	99566	
Christian	1	Yukon-Koyukuk Census Area		
Chuathbaluk	1	Bethel Census Area	99557	
Chugach	2	Kenai Peninsula Borough		
Chugach	2	Valdez-Cordova Census Area		
Chugach	1	Valdez-Cordova Census Area		
Chugach Regional Educational Attendance Area	1	Valdez-Cordova Census Area		
Chugiak	1	Municipality of Anchorage	99567	
Chulitna	1	Matanuska-Susitna Borough		
Chuloonawick	1	Kusilvak Census Area		
Circle	1	Yukon-Koyukuk Census Area	99733	
Circle Hot Springs	1	Yukon-Koyukuk Census Area	99730	
Circle Hot Springs Station	1	Yukon-Koyukuk Census Area		
Clam Gulch	1	Kenai Peninsula Borough	99568	
Clarks Point	1	Dillingham Census Area	99569	
Clark's Point	1	Dillingham Census Area	99569	
Clear	1	Yukon-Koyukuk Census Area	99704	
Clear Creek Park	1	Fairbanks North Star Borough		
Clear Missile Early Warning Station	1	Yukon-Koyukuk Census Area	99704	
Clear Site	1	Yukon-Koyukuk Census Area		
Cleary Summit	1	Fairbanks North Star Borough		
Clifton	1	Municipality of Skagway Borough		
Clover Pass	1	Ketchikan Gateway Borough	99901	
Coal Creek	1	Yukon-Koyukuk Census Area		
Coffman Cove	1	Prince of Wales-Outer Census Area	99918	
Cohoe	1	Kenai Peninsula Borough	99669	
Cold Bay	1	Aleutians East Borough	99571	
Cold Bay Airport	1	Aleutians East Borough	99571	
Coldfoot	1	Yukon-Koyukuk Census Area		
College	1	Fairbanks North Star Borough	99708	
Colorado	1	Matanuska-Susitna Borough		
Colville River	1	North Slope Borough	99723	
Cook Inlet	4	Municipality of Anchorage		
Cook Inlet	4	Dillingham Census Area		
Cook Inlet	4	Kenai Peninsula Borough		
Cook Inlet	4	Matanuska-Susitna Borough		
Cooper Landing	1	Kenai Peninsula Borough	99572	
Copper Center	1	Valdez-Cordova Census Area	99573	
Copper River	1	Valdez-Cordova Census Area		
Copper River Regional Educational Attendance Area	2	Southeast Fairbanks Census Area		
Copper River Regional Educational Attendance Area	2	Valdez-Cordova Census Area		
Copperville	1	Valdez-Cordova Census Area		
Cordova	1	Valdez-Cordova Census Area	99574	
Cordova	1	Valdez-Cordova Census Area		
Cordova City School District	1	Valdez-Cordova Census Area		
Cordova-Mile 13 Airport	1	Valdez-Cordova Census Area	99574	
Cottonwood	1	Matanuska-Susitna Borough	99687	
Council	1	Nome Census Area		
Covenant Life	1	Haines Borough		
Crab Bay	1	Valdez-Cordova Census Area		
Craig	1	Prince of Wales-Outer Census Area	99921	
Craig City School District	1	Prince of Wales-Outer Census Area		
Crooked Creek	1	Bethel Census Area	99575	
Crown Point	1	Kenai Peninsula Borough		
Crystal Falls	1	Valdez-Cordova Census Area		
Cube Cove	1	Skagway-Hoonah-Angoon Census Area		
Curry	1	Matanuska-Susitna Borough	99675	
