= Coarse Money Creek =

Stream in Alaska, United States

Coordinates: 62°07′N 141°49′W

Location
- Country: United States
- State: Alaska
- Region: Southeast Fairbanks Census Area

Coarse Money Creek is a stream in Southeast Fairbanks Census Area, Alaska, in the United States.

Prospectors claimed to have discovered gold in the creek and likely coined the name Coarse Money Creek. The creek was recorded by the United States Geological Survey in 1916. There appear to be numerous remains of human activity along the creek including lumber, tools, and a few cabins.

== See also ==
- List of rivers of Alaska
