= Donnelly, Alaska =

Unincorporated community in the state of Alaska, United States

Donnelly
- Unincorporated community
- Location within the state of Alaska
- Coordinates: 63°40′25″N 145°53′0″W
- Country: United States
- State: Alaska
- Census area: Southeast Fairbanks

Government
  - State senator: Mike Dunleavy (R)
  - State rep.: George Rauscher (R)
- Elevation: 1,785 ft (544 m)
- Time zone: UTC-9 (Alaska (AKST))
  - Summer (DST): UTC-8 (AKDT)
- GNIS feature ID: 1401340

Donnelly is an unincorporated community in Southeast Fairbanks Census Area, Alaska, United States. Its elevation is 1,785 feet (544 m). Located along the Richardson Highway 26 miles (42 km) south of Delta Junction, it was founded around 1904 as a telegraph station between Chitina and Fairbanks. Donnelly's buildings during its early years were log constructed.

== Demographics ==
Historical population
Census	Pop.	Note	%±
1970	7		—
U.S. Decennial Census

Donnelly was incorporated as a city on December 15, 1960, too late to appear on the 1960 U.S. Census. It appeared once on the 1970 census with just seven residents. On March 7, 1974, it was dissolved as an inactive city (i.e. due to very low population). It has not appeared on the census since.
