= Eagle Village, Alaska =

- CDP
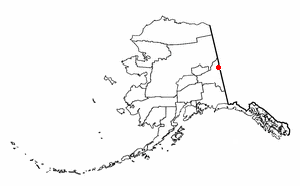
- Location of Eagle Village, Alaska
- Coordinates: 64°46′53″N 141°6′53″W
- Country: United States
- State: Alaska
- Census Area: Southeast Fairbanks

Government
  - State senator: Click Bishop (R)
  - State rep.: Mike Cronk (R)

Area
  - Total: 17.00 sq mi (44.03 km^{2})
  - Land: 17.00 sq mi (44.03 km^{2})
  - Water: 0 sq mi (0.00 km^{2})

Population (2020)
  - Total: 53
  - Density: 3.1/sq mi (1.2/km^{2})
- Time zone: UTC-9 (Alaska (AKST))
  - Summer (DST): UTC-8 (AKDT)
- ZIP code: 99780
- Area code: 907
- FIPS code: 02-20600

Eagle Village is a census-designated place (CDP) in Southeast Fairbanks Census Area, Alaska, United States. As of the 2020 census, Eagle Village had a population of 53.

The village was destroyed in spring 2009 during severe flooding. Ice dams formed on the river, and the waters flooded behind them, destroying much of the old village. There were no fatalities.

The Eagle area has been the historical home to Hän people since before the arrival of Europeans in Alaska as well as Russian fur traders. Of the total Alaskan Hän population of about 50 people, perhaps 12 speak the language.

Eagle Village was called Johnny's in the late 19th and early 20th centuries by some people, after its chief at the time, known as John in English.

== Geography ==
Eagle Village is located at 64°46′53″N 141°6′53″W (64.781324, -141.114728) at the end of the Taylor Highway, next to Eagle on the Yukon River, in a straight line about 3.4 miles (5.5 km) west of the border between Alaska and the Yukon Territory of Canada at the 141st meridian west.

According to the United States Census Bureau, the CDP has a total area of 19.1 square miles (49 km^{2}), all of it land.

== Demographics ==
Historical population
Census	Pop.	Note	%±
1880	106		—
1890	66		−37.7%
1920	60		—
1930	78		30.0%
1940	63		−19.2%
1980	54		—
1990	35		−35.2%
2000	68		94.3%
2010	67		−1.5%
2020	53		−20.9%
U.S. Decennial Census

Eagle Village first appeared on the 1880 U.S. Census as "Fetoutlin (David's people)", an unincorporated village with 106 residents, all of the Tinneh tribe. In 1890, it was called "David's Camp" with a population of 66. In 1920 through 1940, it appeared as Eagle Native Village (to distinguish it from neighboring Eagle to the west). It reappeared in 1980 as Eagle Village and made a census-designated place (CDP).

As of the census of 2000, there were 68 people, 32 households, and 14 families residing in the CDP. The population density was 3.6 inhabitants per square mile (1.4/km^{2}). There were 50 housing units at an average density of 2.6 units per square mile (1.0 units/km^{2}). The racial makeup of the CDP was 55.88% White and 44.12% Alaska Natives.

There were 32 households, out of which 25.0% had children under the age of 18 living with them, 25.0% were married couples living together, 12.5% had a female householder with no husband present, and 56.3% were non-families. 43.8% of all households were made up of individuals, and 3.1% had someone living alone who was 65 years of age or older. The average household size was 2.13 and the average family size was 3.00.

In the CDP, the population was spread out, with 25.0% under the age of 18, 5.9% from 18 to 24, 39.7% from 25 to 44, 25.0% from 45 to 64, and 4.4% who were 65 years of age or older. The median age was 39 years. For every 100 females, there were 119.4 males. For every 100 females age 18 and over, there were 142.9 males.

The median income for a household in the CDP was $6,875, and the median income for a family was $31,250. Males had a median income of $40,000 versus $47,917 for females. The per capita income for the CDP was $13,887. There were 20.0% of families and 55.7% of the population living below the poverty line, including 35.3% of under eighteens and none of those over 64.

== Education ==
Eagle Village is part of the Alaska Gateway School District. Eagle School, a K-12 campus, serves community students.
