= Kathakne, Alaska =

Unincorporated community in the state of Alaska, United States

Kathakne
- Unincorporated community
- Location within the state of Alaska
- Coordinates: 62°58′10″N 141°50′0″W
- Country: United States
- State: Alaska
- Census area: Southeast Fairbanks

Government
  - State senator: Click Bishop (R)
  - State rep.: Dave Talerico (R)
- Elevation: 1,696 ft (517 m)
- Time zone: UTC-9 (Alaska (AKST))
  - Summer (DST): UTC-8 (AKDT)
- GNIS feature ID: 1895065

Kathakne is an unincorporated community in Southeast Fairbanks Census Area, Alaska, United States. Its name is derived from an Indian language. Its elevation is 1,696 feet (517 m). The community is situated on the northeastern shore of Fish Lake, 3 miles (5 km) east of Northway, near the Northway Airport.
