= Chariot, Alaska =

Chariot
- Research site
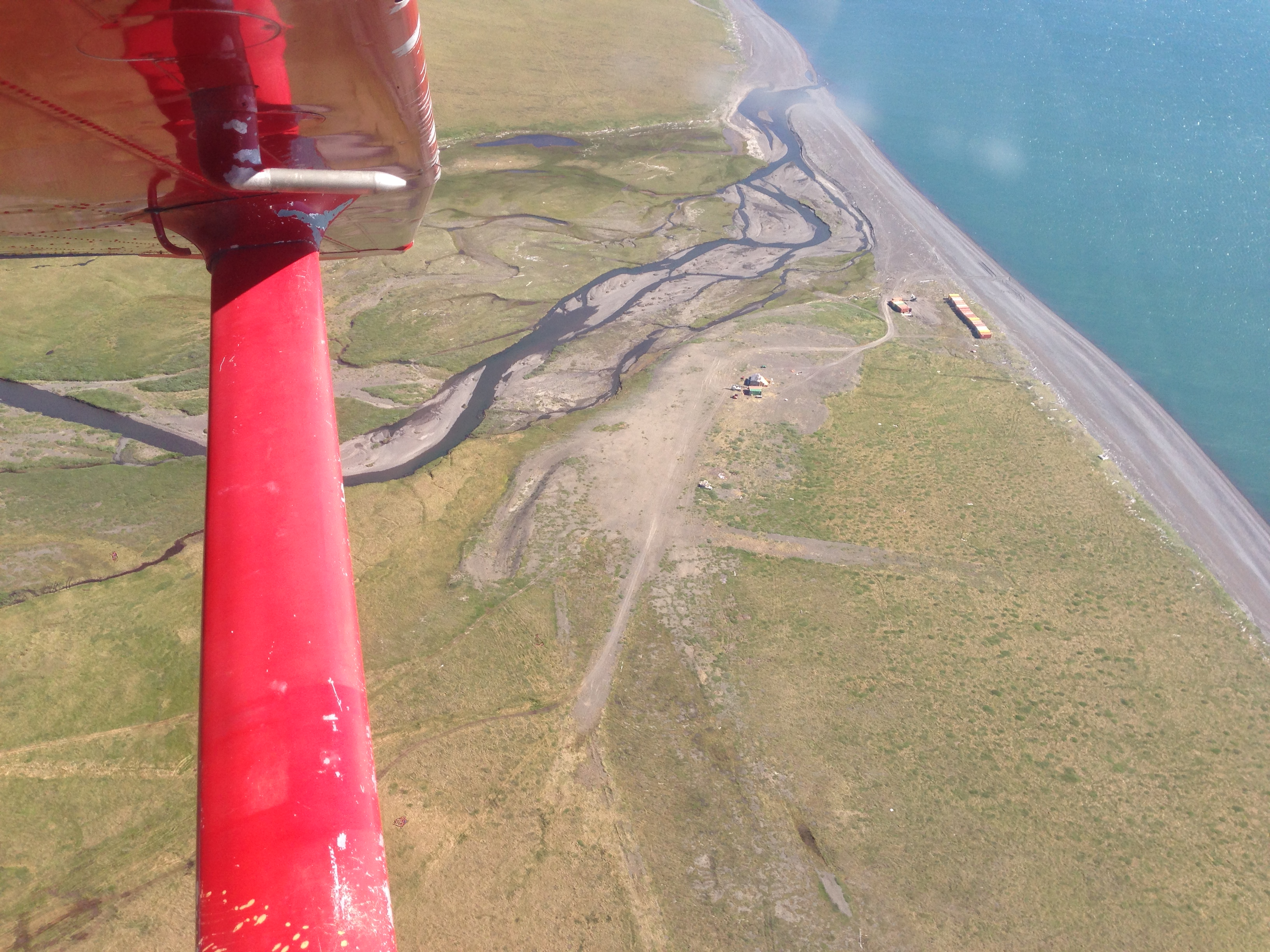
- Aerial shot of Chariot, AK located near Cape Thompson. The once-proposed site of an artificial harbor created using chained nuclear explosions.

- Location within the state of Alaska
- Coordinates: 68°6′21″N 165°44′34″W
- Country: United States
- State: Alaska
- Borough: North Slope
- Time zone: UTC-9 (Alaska (AKST))
  - Summer (DST): UTC-8 (AKDT)
- GNIS feature ID: 1400155

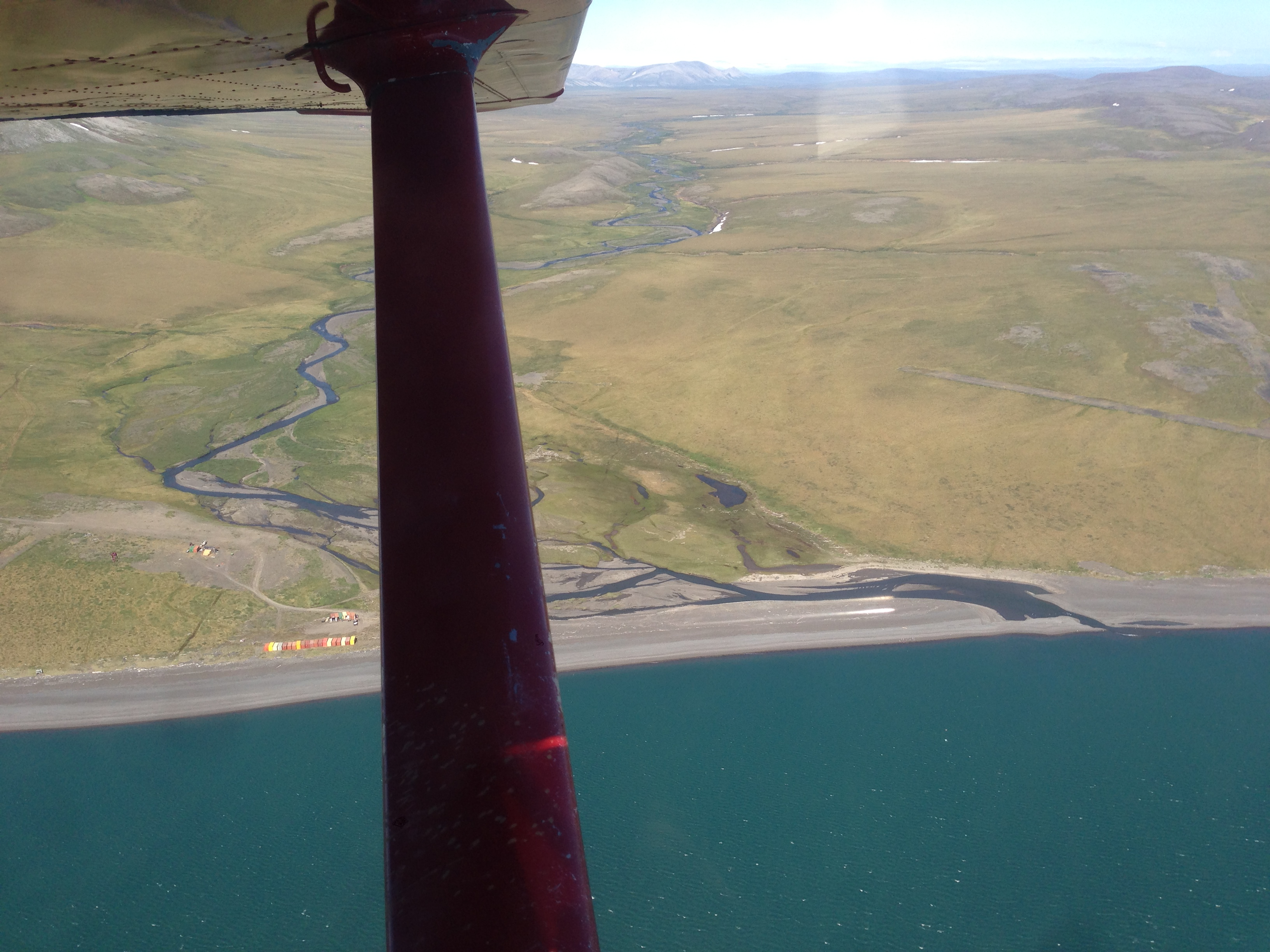
Aerial shot of Chariot, AK located near Cape Thompson. The once proposed site of an artificial harbor created using chained nuclear explosions.

Chariot is a former research site on the coast of the Chukchi Sea in the western part of North Slope Borough in the U.S. state of Alaska. It is located close to the mouth of Ogotoruk Creek in the Ogotoruk Valley, 10 km ESE of Cape Thompson, Arctic Slope. Maximum elevation is 20 meters.

The place was named around 1962 after Project Chariot by personnel of the project. The name likely refers to a headquarters building on the site.

== See also ==
- List of places in Alaska/C
