= 2009 Alaska floods =

Natural disaster in Alaska, United States

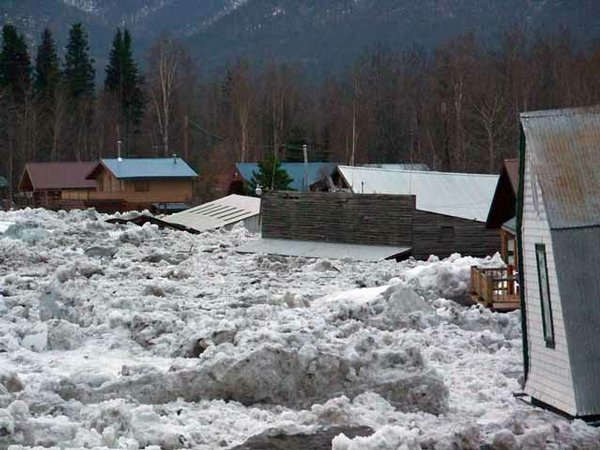
- Ice and floodwater inundate Eagle, Alaska, on May 6, 2009.

Meteorological history
- Duration: May 2009

Overall effects
- Damage: Unknown
- Areas affected: Yukon River, Chena River, Tanana River, Kuskokwim River, Susitna River

The 2009 Alaska floods were a series of natural disasters taking place in the United States state of Alaska during April and May 2009. The floods were a result of heavier-than-normal winter snowfall and above-average spring temperatures that resulted in rapid melting of the winter snowfall. The resulting high water levels were magnified in places by the development of ice dams which caused catastrophic flooding. The record-breaking flood that affected Eagle, Alaska in early May is the best example of an ice dam causing flooding beyond the norm.

== Causes ==
The winter of 2008–2009 brought unusually heavy snowfall to much of Alaska. Kotzebue, on the Bering Sea coast, received a record 102 inches of snowfall—more than double the average of about 40 inches. In other locations, winter snowfall did not set records but still was heavier than average. Fairbanks, Alaska's second-largest city, received 71.5 inches of snow and experienced unusually cold temperatures for the first three months of the year, preventing early melting of the snowpack. Snow also fell heavily in Lake Minchumina and the Alaska Range. At Eagle, the ice on the Yukon River was 55 inches thick—over 40 percent greater than normal.

By mid-April, concerns were raised that the heavy snowpack would pose a problem if it melted quickly. "There's plenty of snowpack out there to cause problems this year," warned a National Weather Service meteorologist at the time.

In Fairbanks and most of Interior Alaska, temperatures remained below freezing for most of April and temperatures did not hit 50 degrees until April 26. After that date, temperatures rose rapidly. By April 28, the snowpack at Fairbanks International Airport had melted, leaving only snow berms and piles. The next day, Fairbanks recorded a record high temperature of 74 degrees. On April 30, Fairbanks set an all-time high temperature for the month of April when the thermometer reached 76 degrees. Record high temperatures also were recorded at Eagle, Delta Junction, and other towns in central Alaska. In less than one week, central Alaska residents went from skiing to swatting mosquitoes. The warmup was so rapid that on May 1, the Alaska Division of Forestry issued its first wildfire alert of the year. By that date, however, rivers across central Alaska were already flooding.

== Tanana Valley ==
The Tanana River valley was the first area of Alaska to experience spring flooding. On April 28, the ice on the Salcha River broke up, flowed into the Tanana River, and formed an ice jam. The jam partially dammed the river, flooding low-lying areas of the town of Salcha. High temperatures during the following couple of days added to the ice jam, and several families were forced from their homes by the rising water. Fairbanks North Star Borough officials set up a self-serve sand bag station at the Salcha Fairgrounds, and residents near the river erected impromptu levees. The Salcha ice jam broke loose on April 30, causing flood levels to decline dramatically. Record-high temperatures that day caused jams to form on other rivers in the area, however.

On the Chatanika River, a jam caused a flood that threatened several homes before the ice broke loose and dropped water levels to near normal. By May 1, almost the entire Fairbanks North Star Borough was directly threatened by some sort of flooding. In Fox, small-stream flooding caused a house to be evacuated. Flooding was reported in North Pole and in rural areas of the borough. On May 2, high water on the Chena River swept through Fairbanks, causing flooding in low-lying areas. The high water caused the U.S. Army Corps of Engineers to consider closing the floodgates at the Chena River Lakes Flood Control Project, a structure built to protect Fairbanks from flooding. The high water registered just below the threshold to close the gates, however, and they remained open throughout the flood. By May 5, the water receded in Fairbanks and the surrounding area as the Tanana River drained floodwater into the Yukon. The draining high water ripped a barge away from its moorings in the Tanana River near Nenana, causing it to float down the Yukon River until it was arrested by a helicopter.

== Kuskokwim River ==
On May 6, multiple ice jams formed on the Kuskokwim River near the villages of Upper and Lower Kalskag. These jams caused the snowmelt-bolstered river to flood areas around both villages, forcing residents to take action. After the jams broke and flowed downriver, they re-formed near Akiak. The resulting flood caused the evacuation of more than 10 percent of the town's residents to nearby Bethel, while many of the remaining residents sought shelter in the local school.

== Susitna River ==
On May 3, an ice jam formed on the Susitna River, causing flooding that washed out the tracks of the Alaska Railroad. Large chunks of ice also were pushed onto the tracks, making work difficult for crews assigned to repair the rail line. The incident severed rail traffic between Fairbanks and Anchorage until May 7, when track repairs were completed and the railroad resumed service.

== Yukon River ==
=== Eagle and Eagle Village ===
On May 3 and May 4, ice on the Yukon River near the Alaska/Canada border began to break up. Open water was seen near the town of Eagle, which is just west of the border. On May 4, a large ice jam developed about 10 miles downriver of Eagle. The high-flowing Yukon, fueled by snowmelt from the high temperatures of the previous week, soon flooded the town. Large chunks of ice were carried over the town's riverbank retaining wall and smashed into stores and buildings. The Alaska Native settlement of Eagle Village was severely flooded and virtually destroyed by marauding blocks of ice. In Eagle itself, floodwater lifted buildings off their foundations and caused havoc for the town's 120-plus residents.

=== Middle Yukon ===
The high water released by the break-up of the Eagle ice jam reached Circle, the next significant town downriver from Eagle, in early May.

The river surge hit Fort Yukon on May 7 and early in the morning of May 8. Although the flood reached 4 feet (1.2 m) above flood stage, it did not top the town's Yukon River levee. Areas outside the levee received minor flooding, and some residents were evacuated to the village school and to Fort Yukon Air Force Station.

=== Lower Yukon ===
The surge of water released from the Yukon River near Eagle in the first week of May reached the lower Yukon villages of Grayling, Holy Cross, and Nulato by May 16.

== Response ==
Initial responses to the flooding were organized by people and organizations closest to the separate disasters. Most efforts were focused on assisting residents of Eagle, but notable help was given to other affected communities, including Akiak and Stevens Village.

On May 3, National Park Service employees from the headquarters of the Yukon-Charley Rivers National Preserve in Eagle moved to support residents of the town who had been flooded out of their homes. Supplies of food and water were delivered to old Eagle Village on May 5, and the next day, officials from the Alaska Division of Homeland Security and Emergency Management arrived to manage the response from a headquarters set up at Eagle's school. By Thursday, May 7, National Park Service helicopters were airborne, checking on people in isolated homesteads near and within the preserve.

On May 6, Governor Sarah Palin declared the drainages of the Yukon, Kuskokwim, Kobuk, and Susitna rivers to be disaster areas. The next day, she canceled a trip to attend the White House Correspondents Dinner in order to survey the damaged communities.

In Fairbanks, private citizens donated more than 7,000 pounds (3,175 kg) of supplies to Eagle residents. The amount of donations was so great that the airline that volunteered to fly the supplies to Eagle was overwhelmed. By May 7, the total amount of private donations exceeded 10,500 pounds (4,763 kg).

By May 10, larger amounts of government aid began reaching affected areas. Akiak on the Kuskokwim River received diesel fuel, potable water, food, and other items, while four 400-gallon (1,514-liter) water tanks were sent to Eagle to alleviate problems caused by contaminated wells.
