= Northway, Alaska =

Northway, Alaska K’ehtthiign
- CDP
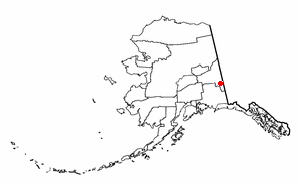
- Location of Northway, Alaska
- Coordinates: 62°58′9″N 141°54′18″W
- Country: United States
- State: Alaska
- Census Area: Southeast Fairbanks

Government
  - State senator: Click Bishop (R)
  - State rep.: Mike Cronk (R)

Area
  - Total: 247.32 sq mi (640.55 km^{2})
  - Land: 242.41 sq mi (627.84 km^{2})
  - Water: 4.91 sq mi (12.71 km^{2})
- Elevation: 1,709 ft (521 m)

Population (2020)
  - Total: 234
  - Density: 0.96/sq mi (0.37/km^{2})
- Time zone: UTC-9 (Alaska (AKST))
  - Summer (DST): UTC-8 (AKDT)
- ZIP code: 99764
- Area code: 907
- FIPS code: 02-56220
- GNIS feature ID: 1407253

Northway (Upper Tanana: K’ehtthiign) is a census-designated place (CDP) in Southeast Fairbanks Census Area, Alaska, United States, also encompassing the sites of Charlieskin Village and Kathakne. Prior to the 2020 Census, the borders of the CDP was expanded, merging with Northway Junction and Northway Village. The population was 234 at the 2020 census, up from 71 in 2010.

== Geography ==
Northway is located at 62°58′9″N 141°54′18″W (62.969297, -141.905034).

According to the United States Census Bureau in 2020, the CDP has a total area of 247.32 square miles (640.6 km^{2}), of which, 242.41 square miles (627.8 km^{2}) of it is land and 4.91 square miles (12.7 km^{2}) of it (8.45%) is water.

The highest sea-level pressure in the United States was recorded at Northway on January 31, 1989, with a reading of 31.85 inches, a record only surpassed by two readings in Siberia. Due to aircraft altimeters only being able to calibrate to 31 inches, most were grounded.

== Climate ==
Northway has a dry-winter continental subarctic climate (Köppen Dwc).

Climate data for Northway, Alaska (1991–2020 normals, extremes 1942–present)
Month	Jan	Feb	Mar	Apr	May	Jun	Jul	Aug	Sep	Oct	Nov	Dec	Year
Record high °F (°C)	43 (6)	48 (9)	56 (13)	74 (23)	88 (31)	92 (33)	88 (31)	89 (32)	80 (27)	68 (20)	42 (6)	51 (11)	92 (33)
Mean maximum °F (°C)	18.2 (−7.7)	27.7 (−2.4)	42.4 (5.8)	58.8 (14.9)	73.4 (23.0)	81.7 (27.6)	81.7 (27.6)	78.7 (25.9)	66.3 (19.1)	49.4 (9.7)	24.7 (−4.1)	17.8 (−7.9)	84.1 (28.9)
Mean daily maximum °F (°C)	−4.5 (−20.3)	7.8 (−13.4)	24.5 (−4.2)	45.3 (7.4)	60.5 (15.8)	69.6 (20.9)	71.5 (21.9)	66.5 (19.2)	54.5 (12.5)	32.1 (0.1)	7.9 (−13.4)	−2.3 (−19.1)	36.1 (2.3)
Daily mean °F (°C)	−13.3 (−25.2)	−4.0 (−20.0)	8.3 (−13.2)	31.1 (−0.5)	47.2 (8.4)	57.2 (14.0)	59.9 (15.5)	55.0 (12.8)	43.2 (6.2)	23.2 (−4.9)	−0.7 (−18.2)	−10.8 (−23.8)	24.7 (−4.1)
Mean daily minimum °F (°C)	−22.1 (−30.1)	−15.8 (−26.6)	−8.0 (−22.2)	16.9 (−8.4)	34.0 (1.1)	44.7 (7.1)	48.4 (9.1)	43.5 (6.4)	31.9 (−0.1)	14.3 (−9.8)	−9.2 (−22.9)	−19.3 (−28.5)	13.3 (−10.4)
Mean minimum °F (°C)	−47.6 (−44.2)	−40.1 (−40.1)	−32.9 (−36.1)	−6.8 (−21.6)	22.2 (−5.4)	33.7 (0.9)	39.6 (4.2)	31.9 (−0.1)	19.1 (−7.2)	−8.3 (−22.4)	−33.0 (−36.1)	−40.5 (−40.3)	−51.1 (−46.2)
Record low °F (°C)	−72 (−58)	−71 (−57)	−56 (−49)	−42 (−41)	2 (−17)	25 (−4)	32 (0)	12 (−11)	−6 (−21)	−36 (−38)	−55 (−48)	−64 (−53)	−72 (−58)
Average precipitation inches (mm)	0.31 (7.9)	0.24 (6.1)	0.15 (3.8)	0.22 (5.6)	0.98 (25)	2.26 (57)	2.92 (74)	1.79 (45)	1.07 (27)	0.53 (13)	0.51 (13)	0.30 (7.6)	11.28 (285)
Average snowfall inches (cm)	6.3 (16)	5.2 (13)	3.5 (8.9)	1.2 (3.0)	1.8 (4.6)	0.0 (0.0)	0.0 (0.0)	0.0 (0.0)	1.9 (4.8)	6.1 (15)	9.8 (25)	7.1 (18)	42.9 (108.3)
Average extreme snow depth inches (cm)	14.0 (36)	14.8 (38)	14.7 (37)	11.2 (28)	1.4 (3.6)	0.0 (0.0)	0.0 (0.0)	0.0 (0.0)	1.1 (2.8)	4.6 (12)	9.6 (24)	11.8 (30)	16.2 (41)
Average precipitation days	5.5	3.5	3.4	3.0	8.2	12.4	15.0	13.4	9.1	7.9	7.2	5.7	94.3
Average snowy days	8.4	6.6	4.2	1.4	1.1	0.0	0.0	0.0	1.5	7.1	10.8	8.9	50.0
Source 1: NOAA
Source 2: National Weather Service

== Transportation ==
There is a shuttle between Tok and Northway three times a week, connecting with the Fairbanks - Glennallen - Anchorage service.

== Demographics ==
Historical population
Census	Pop.	Note	%±
1950	196		—
1960	196		0.0%
1970	40		−79.6%
1980	73		82.5%
1990	123		68.5%
2000	95		−22.8%
2010	71		−25.3%
2020	234		229.6%
U.S. Decennial Census

Northway first appeared on the 1950 U.S. Census as the unincorporated village of "Northway-Nabesna", which included the native village of Nabesna on the west side of Nabesna River across from present-day Northway Village. It returned as Northway in 1960. In 1980, it was made a census-designated place (CDP).

As of the census of 2010, there were 290 people. The racial makeup of the CDP was 66% Native American, 29% White, and 4.8% from two or more races.

The median age was 39.6.

== Education ==
Northway is part of the Alaska Gateway School District. Walter Northway School, a K-12 campus, serves community students.
