= Northway Junction, Alaska =

- CDP
- Location within Alaska Location within North America Location within Earth
- Coordinates: 63°0′23″N 141°46′41″W
- Country: United States
- State: Alaska
- Census Area: Southeast Fairbanks

Government
  - State senator: Click Bishop (R)
  - State rep.: Mike Cronk (R)

Area
  - Total: 8.6 sq mi (22.2 km^{2})
  - Land: 8.5 sq mi (21.9 km^{2})
  - Water: 0.12 sq mi (0.3 km^{2})
- Elevation: 1,693 ft (516 m)

Population (2010)
  - Total: 54
  - Density: 6.4/sq mi (2.5/km^{2})
- Time zone: UTC-9 (Alaska (AKST))
  - Summer (DST): UTC-8 (AKDT)
- Area code: 907
- FIPS code: 02-56250
- GNIS feature ID: 1866965

Northway Junction was a census-designated place (CDP) in Southeast Fairbanks Census Area, Alaska, United States. It was merged with Northway CDP prior to the 2020 Census. The population was 54 at the 2010 census, down from 72 in 2000.

== History ==
Historically, the area around Northway was used as hunting grounds for the Athabascan people. The native settlement established there, originally called Nabesna, is now known as Northway Village, roughly two miles south of Northway Junction. In World War II, Northway Junction was established as a United States Army supply point for the construction of the Alaska Highway, named after the Athabascan Chief Walter Northway. An airfield named Reeve's Field was also established as part of a series of airfields across Canada and Alaska known as the Northwest Staging Route.

== Geography ==
According to the United States Census Bureau, the CDP has a total area of 8.6 square miles (22 km^{2}), of which, 8.5 square miles (22 km^{2}) of it is land and 0.1 square miles (0.26 km^{2}) of it (1.40%) is water.

== Demographics ==
Historical population
Census	Pop.	Note	%±
1990	88		—
2000	72		−18.2%
2010	54		−25.0%
U.S. Decennial Census

Northway Junction first appeared on the 1990 U.S. Census as a census-designated place (CDP).

As of the census of 2000, there were 72 people, 23 households, and 18 families residing in the CDP. The population density was 8.5 inhabitants per square mile (3.3/km^{2}). There were 29 housing units at an average density of 3.4 per square mile (1.3/km^{2}). The racial makeup of the CDP was 41.67% White, 48.61% Native American, and 9.72% from two or more races. 4.17% of the population were Hispanic or Latino of any race.

There were 23 households, out of which 47.8% had children under the age of 18 living with them, 56.5% were married couples living together, 8.7% had a female householder with no husband present, and 21.7% were non-families. 17.4% of all households were made up of individuals, and none had someone living alone who was 65 years of age or older. The average household size was 3.13 and the average family size was 3.44.

In the CDP, the age distribution of the population shows 38.9% under the age of 18, 6.9% from 18 to 24, 34.7% from 25 to 44, 19.4% from 45 to 64, . The median age was 27 years. For every 100 females, there were 84.6 males. For every 100 females age 18 and over, there were 131.6 males.

The median income for a household in the CDP was $67,500, and the median income for a family was $63,750. Males had a median income of $38,750 versus $36,250 for females. The per capita income for the CDP was $16,439. There were 11.1% of families and 15.8% of the population living below the poverty line, including 20.0% of under eighteens and none of those over 64.
