= Ice jam =

Accumulation of ice in a river

Schematic rendition of a thickened ice jam. Based on, from. Fig. 4

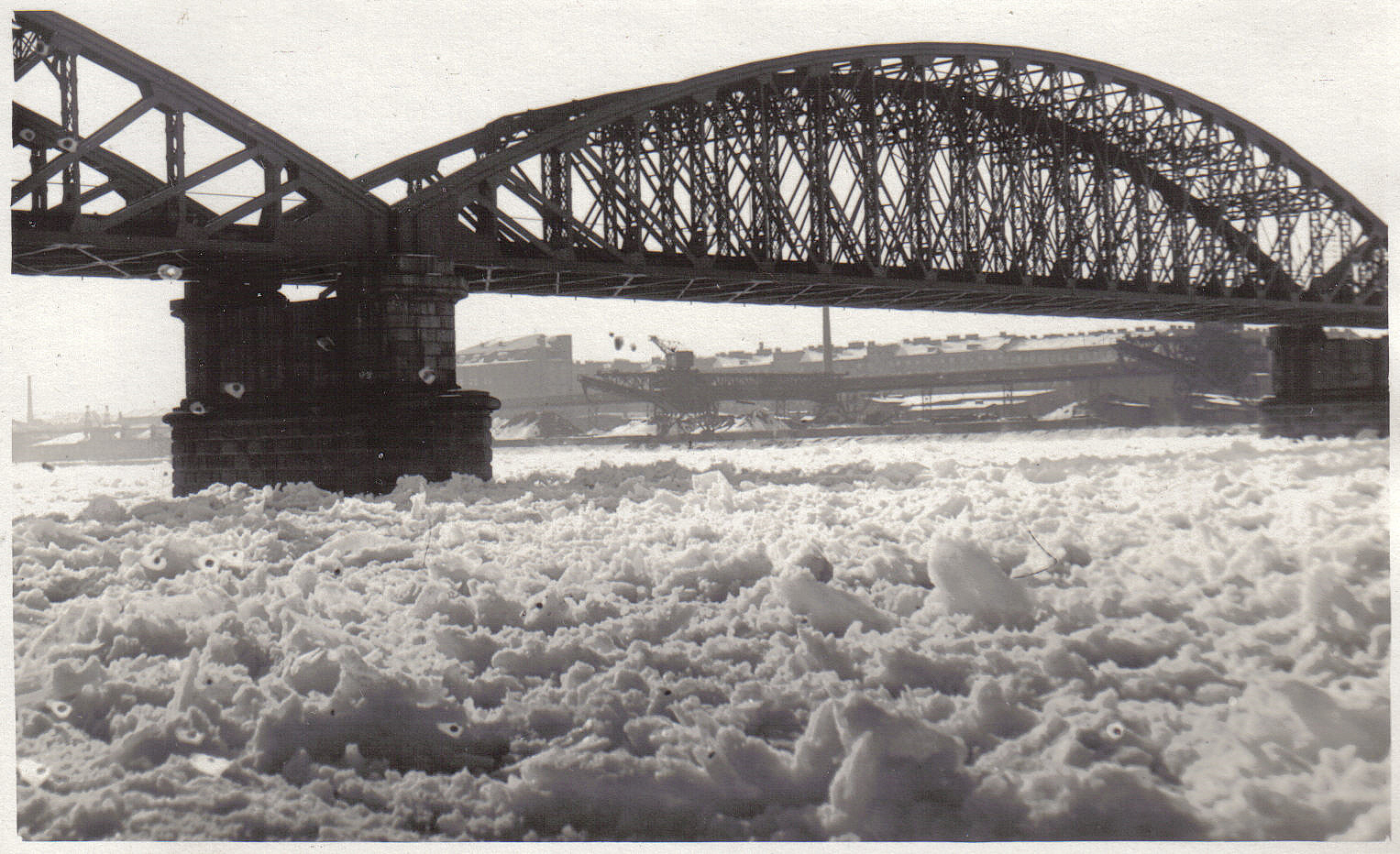
Ice jam on the Danube River at a bridge in Vienna, Austria

Ice jams occur when the ice that is drifting down-current in a river comes to a stop, for instance, at a river bend, when it contacts the river bed in a shallow area, or against bridge piers. Doing so increases the resistance to flow, thereby inducing an increase in water level upstream of the jam (referred to as backwater). Ice jams are thus a main cause for flooding during the winter. In addition, when the jam is released, depending on the conditions under which this happens, the amount of water that was retained behind the jam can also lead to flooding downstream of where the jam occurred. Ice jam floods are generally less predictable and can also be faster than open-water floods.

== Mechanisms ==
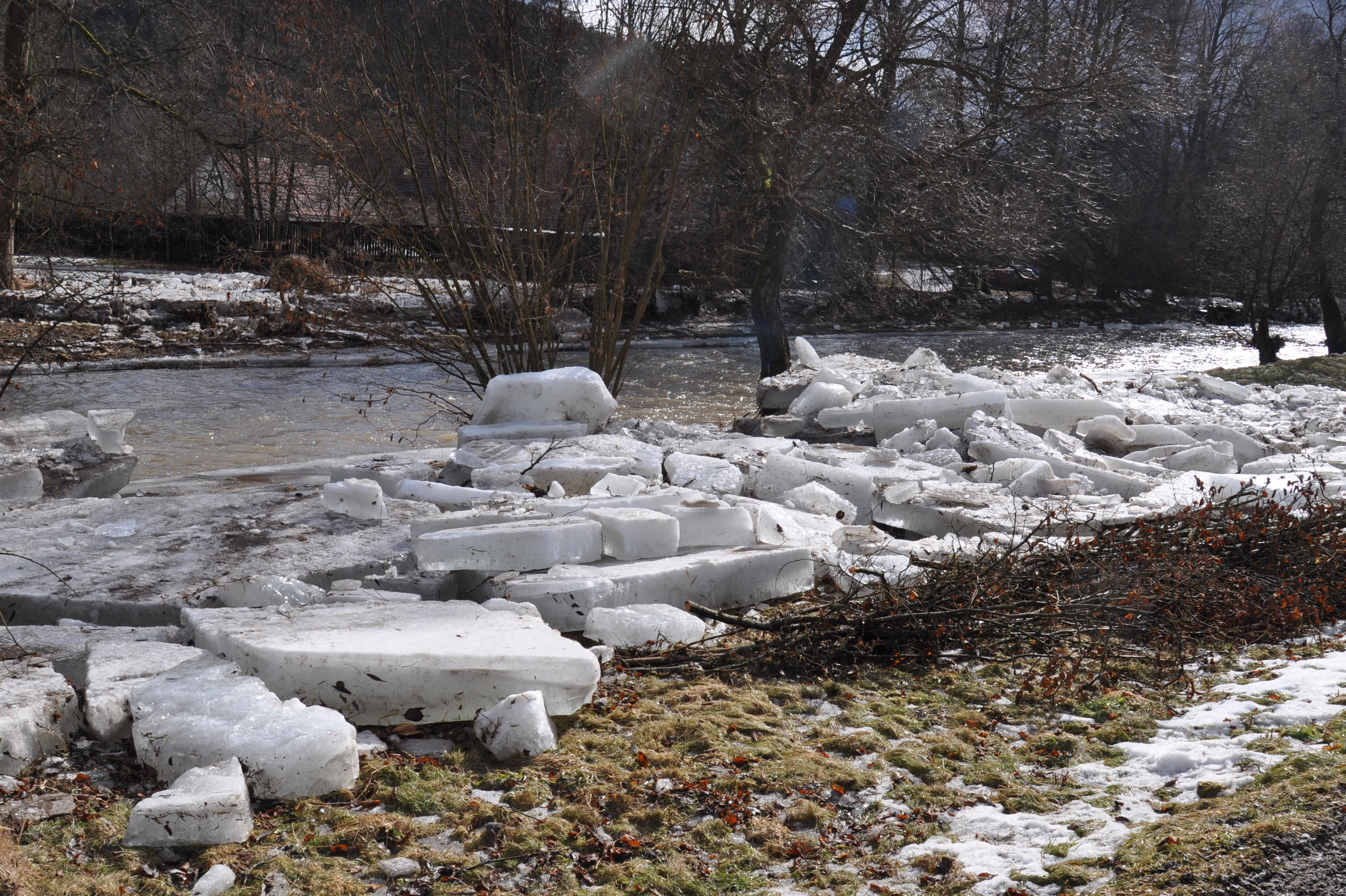
Ice floes/cakes left over on a river bank after an ice jam

Ice jams on rivers usually occur in the springtime as the river ice begins to break up, but may also occur in early winter during freeze-up. The break-up process is described in three phases: pre-break-up, break-up and final drive. Pre-break-up usually begins with increased springtime river flow, water level, and temperatures fracturing the river ice and separating it from the shore. Changes in river height from dam releases may also affect the pre-break-up. During the break-up, the ice in areas of rapids is carried downstream as an ice floe and may jam on still frozen sections of ice on calm water or against structures in the river such as the Honeymoon Bridge, destroyed in 1938 by an ice jam. Smaller jams may dislodge, flow downstream and form a larger jam. During the final drive, a large jam will dislodge and take out the remaining jams, clearing the river of ice in a matter of hours. Ice jams usually occur in spring, but they can happen as winter sets in when the downstream part becomes frozen first. Freeze-up jams may be larger because the ice is stronger and temperatures are continuing to cool unlike a spring break-up when the environment is warming, but are less likely to suddenly release water.

Three types of natural ice jams can occur:

1. a surface jam, a single layer of ice in a floe on calm water;
2. a narrow-channel or wide-channel jam; and
3. a hanging jam, the accumulation of river ice at slow current areas which only occur during freeze-up.

Ice jams also occur at sharp bends in the river, at human-constructed objects such as bridge piers, and at confluences.

== Occurrences and consequences ==
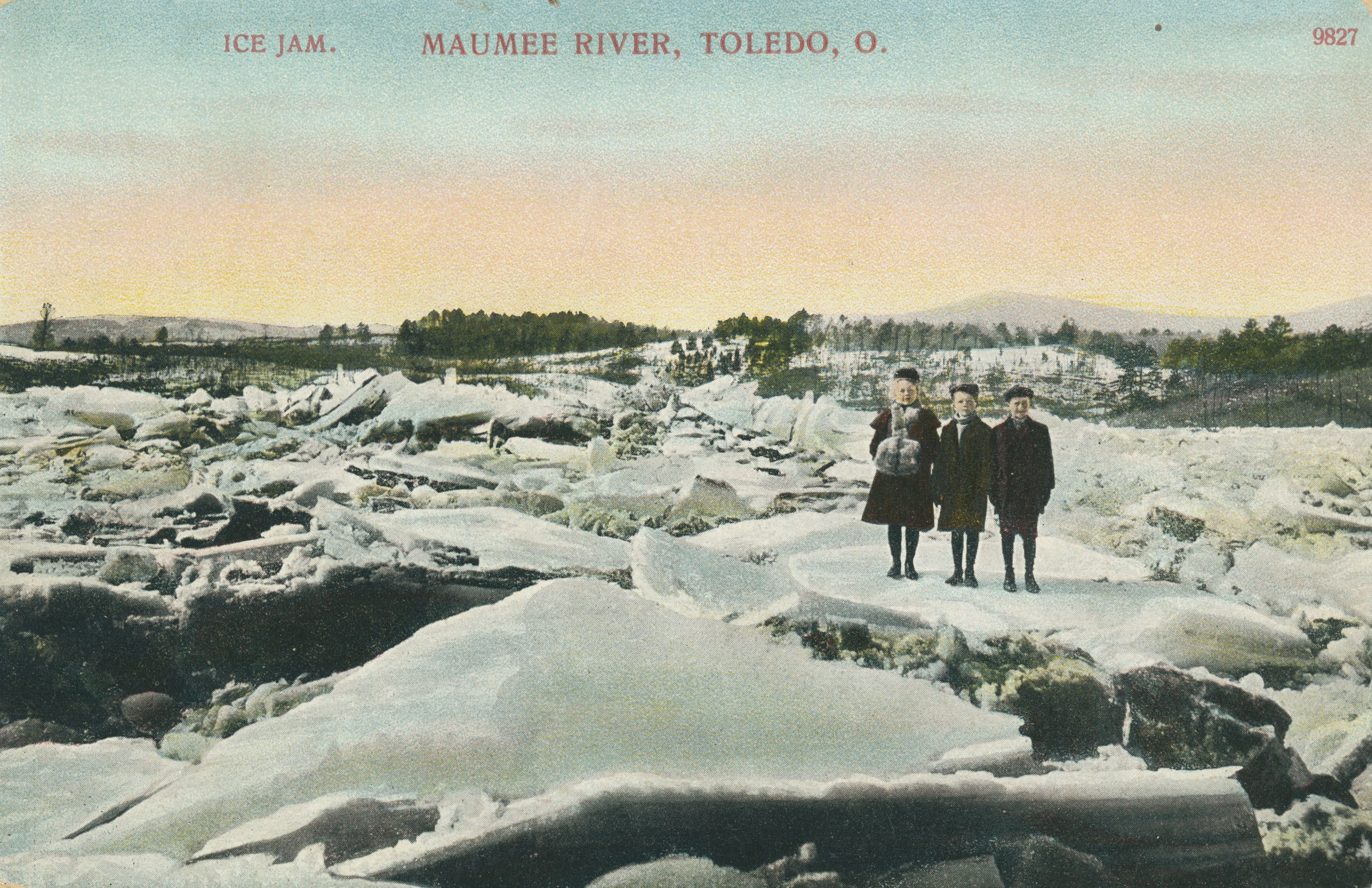
Children standing on Ice Jam in the Maumee River, Toledo, Ohio

In the Northern Hemisphere, northerly flowing rivers tend to have more ice jams because the upper, more southerly reaches thaw first and the ice gets carried downstream into the still-frozen northerly part. There are three physical hazards of ice jams. The jam induces flow restriction, either or both because of increased friction along the ice under surface and because of a decrease in the channel's cross-sectional area. An example is the 2009 Red River Flood and the 2009 Alaska floods. The second type of hazard occurs as the ice jam breaks apart, and a sudden surge of water breaks through flooding areas downstream of the jam (see below). Such a surge occurred on the Saint Lawrence River in 1848. The third hazard is that the ice buildup and final drive may damage structures in or near the river and boats in the river. Ice jams may scour the river bed, causing damage or benefit to wildlife habitats and possibly damage to structures in the river.

== Javes ==
Mechanical break-up of an ice jam leading to the development of a jave with a wave (dynamic forerunner) at the leading edge. This scenario shows the release of an unimpeded ice run (with open water downstream). Based on

An ice jam release wave, or jave, is generated in a river upon the break-up of an ice jam and the release of the water that accumulated behind it. This happens when the hydrodynamic forces upstream of the jam are sufficient to overcome either or both the jam's internal strength and the forces that are maintaining it in place. These events may induce a rise in water level in the range of decimeters per minute, and an increase in discharge by a factor of 2.75. A jave typically encloses an ice run, i.e. the downstream flow of a mixture of ice plates and rubble at a velocity that is higher than the normal river flow, preceded by a 'precursor' wave, called dynamic forerunner. As the wave travels downstream, it decreases in height and slows down because of frictional effects (against the river bed and shorelines) as well as those related with the slope of the river bed.

Minutes to weeks can go by before break-up. Release mechanisms include mobilization of the ice cover downstream which was maintaining the jam in place, the formation of an open lead immediately downstream of it, and increasing discharge. Several known thresholds (water levels, discharge, discharge rate, side resistance, boundary constraints and flexural criterion) may provide an indication of when such a break-up can occur.

== Ice jam flood risk ==
Establishing ice jam flood risk involves the following steps:

=== Description of ice jam formation ===
Understanding the formation of ice jams on rivers is crucial. Historical data on the co-location of ice jam formations is also useful.

=== Flood hazard mapping ===
This involves creating profiles of the area, including agent profiles and water levels along the river. The goal is to produce a risk map for the study area.

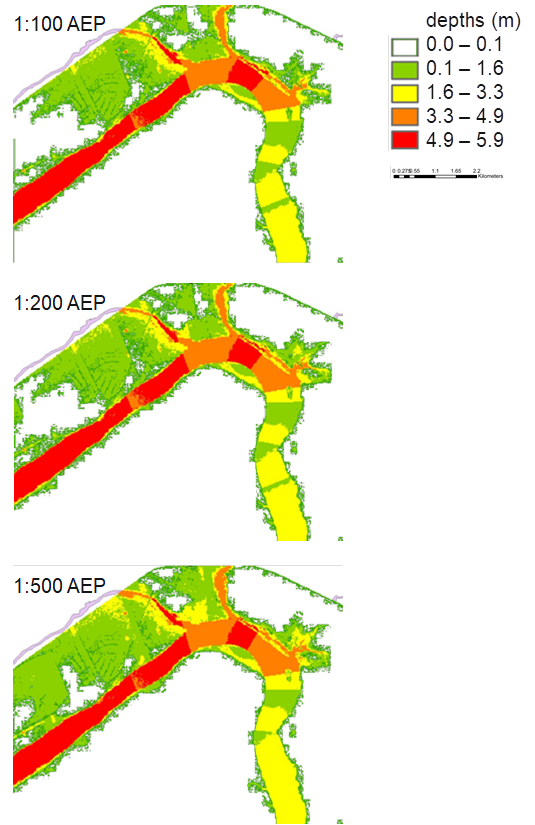
Ice jam flood hazard map of Badger along the Exploits River in Newfoundland

=== Risk calculation ===
Risk is calculated by combining hazard and vulnerability. Hazard is usually associated with flood intensity, extent, depth, and probability. Vulnerability involves exposure and susceptibility of different types of residential and commercial buildings within the floodplain area or in between specification periods of floods.

=== Damage assessment ===
Damage is assessed in terms of structural damage and content damage at different depths of flooding. A certain depth might have certain damages created for the exposure.

=== Software tools ===
The process involves using software tools (possibly GIS) to add data layers, calculate flood depths, and extrapolate water levels for the transects to the downtown area. The water levels are obtained from a stochastic modelling framework for the water channel.

== Prediction and mitigation ==
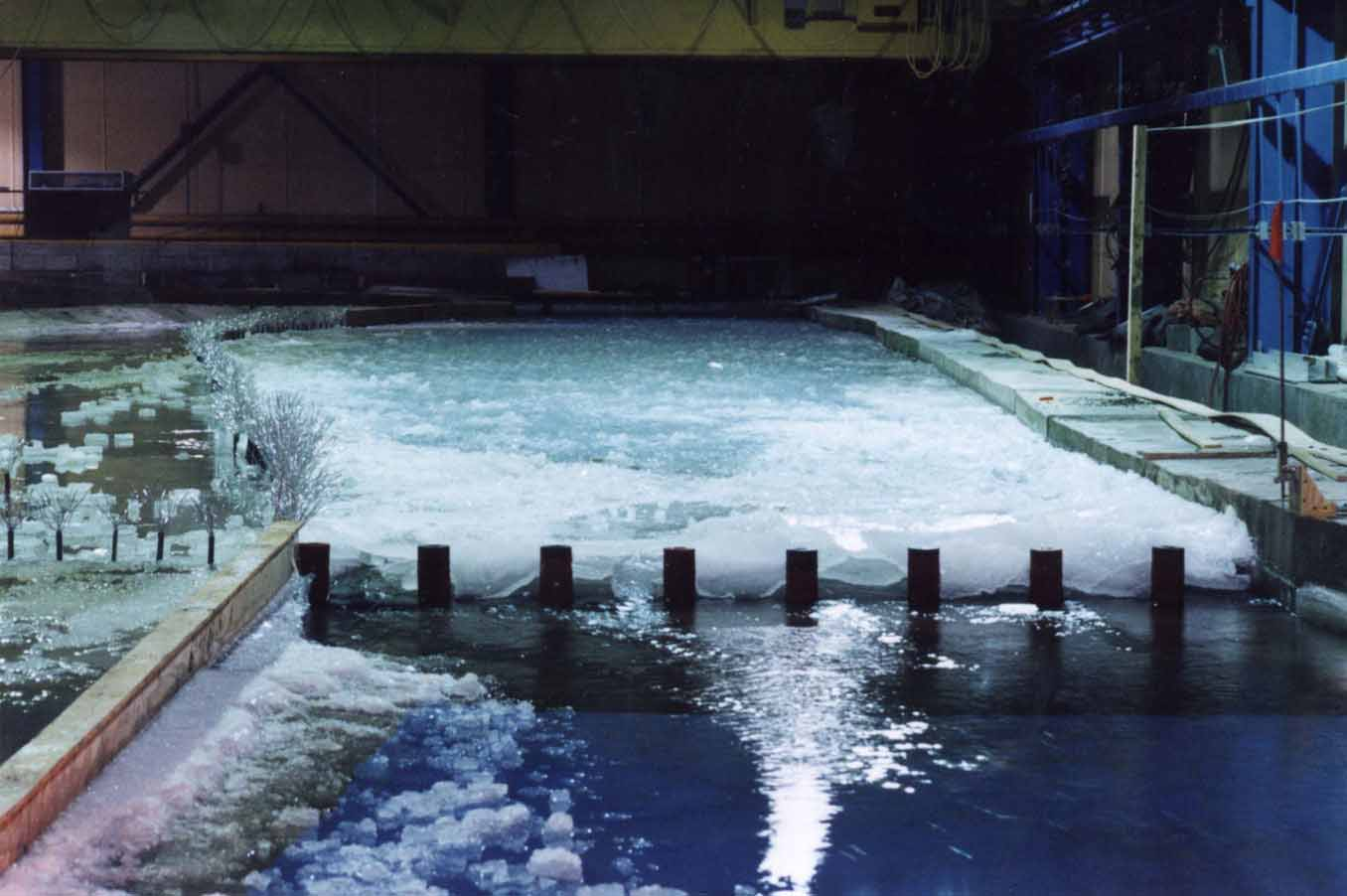
Model of a structure built to retain river ice upstream of a site on Cazenovia Creek that was the cause of ice jams during river thaws.

Early warnings of an ice jam include using trained observers to monitor break-up conditions and ice motion detectors.

The prevention of ice jams may be accomplished by

1. weakening the ice before the break-up by cutting or drilling holes in the ice;
2. weakening the ice by dusting it with a dark colored sand; or
3. controlling the timing of the break-up using ice breakers, towboats, hovercraft, or amphibious excavators. However, the movement of migratory fish is known to be related to freeze-up and break-up, so affecting ice break-up may affect fish migration.

Where floods threaten human habitation, the blockage may be artificially cleared. Ice blasting using dynamite may be used, except in urban areas, as well as other mechanical means such as excavation equipment, or permanent measures such as ice control structures and flood control. Occasionally, military aircraft have been used to bomb ice jams with limited success as part of an effort to clear them.

== See also ==
- Drift ice
- Fast ice
- Ice shove
- Jamming
- Pressure ridge
