= Navy Town, Alaska =

Coordinates: 52°50′27″N 173°10′32″E

Navy Town is a formerly populated place in the Aleutians West Census Area, Alaska, United States. It is located on the southeast coast of Attu Island, on the western shore of Massacre Bay, and was named during the military occupation of the area in World War II. Attu Station was decommissioned in 2010, leaving Navy Town and the island with no permanent population.

== See also ==
- Attu Station, Alaska
