= Northway Village, Alaska =

- CDP
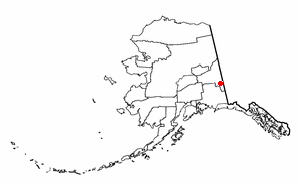
- Location of Northway Village, Alaska
- Coordinates: 62°58′47″N 141°57′4″W
- Country: United States
- State: Alaska
- Census Area: Southeast Fairbanks

Government
  - State senator: Click Bishop (R)
  - State rep.: Mike Cronk (R)

Area
  - Total: 2.7 sq mi (7.1 km^{2})
  - Land: 2.6 sq mi (6.8 km^{2})
  - Water: 0.12 sq mi (0.3 km^{2})

Population (2010)
  - Total: 98
  - Density: 37/sq mi (14/km^{2})
- Time zone: UTC-9 (Alaska (AKST))
  - Summer (DST): UTC-8 (AKDT)
- Area code: 907
- FIPS code: 02-56260

Northway Village (Upper Tanana: K'ehtthiign) was a census-designated place (CDP) in Southeast Fairbanks Census Area, Alaska, United States. It was merged with Northway CDP prior to the 2020 Census. The population was 98 at the 2010 census, down from 107 in 2000.

== Geography ==
Northway Village is located at 62°58′47″N 141°57′04″W.

According to the United States Census Bureau, the CDP has a total area of 2.8 square miles (7.3 km^{2}), of which, 2.6 square miles (6.7 km^{2}) of it is land and 0.1 square miles (0.26 km^{2}) of it (4.00%) is water.

== Demographics ==
Historical population
Census	Pop.	Note	%±
1980	112		—
1990	113		0.9%
2000	107		−5.3%
2010	98		−8.4%
U.S. Decennial Census

Northway Village first appeared on the 1980 U.S. Census as a census-designated place (CDP). It had previously been a part of Northway-Nabesna and Northway in 1950 and 1960 (population 196 for both censuses).

As of the census of 2000, there were 107 people, 32 households, and 20 families residing in the CDP. The population density was 40.5 inhabitants per square mile (15.6/km^{2}). There were 39 housing units at an average density of 14.8 per square mile (5.7/km^{2}). The racial makeup of the CDP was 1.87% White, 89.72% Native American, 2.80% from other races, and 5.61% from two or more races. 5.61% of the population were Hispanic or Latino of any race.

There were 32 households, out of which 50.0% had children under the age of 18 living with them, 31.3% were married couples living together, 25.0% had a female householder with no husband present, and 34.4% were non-families. 31.3% of all households were made up of individuals, and 12.5% had someone living alone who was 65 years of age or older. The average household size was 3.34 and the average family size was 4.19.

In the CDP, the age distribution of the population shows 32.7% under the age of 18, 14.0% from 18 to 24, 21.5% from 25 to 44, 24.3% from 45 to 64, and 7.5% who were 65 years of age or older. The median age was 27 years. For every 100 females, there were 91.1 males. For every 100 females age 18 and over, there were 118.2 males.

The median income for a household in the CDP was $24,688, and the median income for a family was $26,875. Males had a median income of $27,188 versus $22,500 for females. The per capita income for the CDP was $10,300. There were 9.1% of families and 25.0% of the population living below the poverty line, including 28.6% of under eighteens and none of those over 64.
