= Deltana, Alaska =

Town in Alaska

- CDP
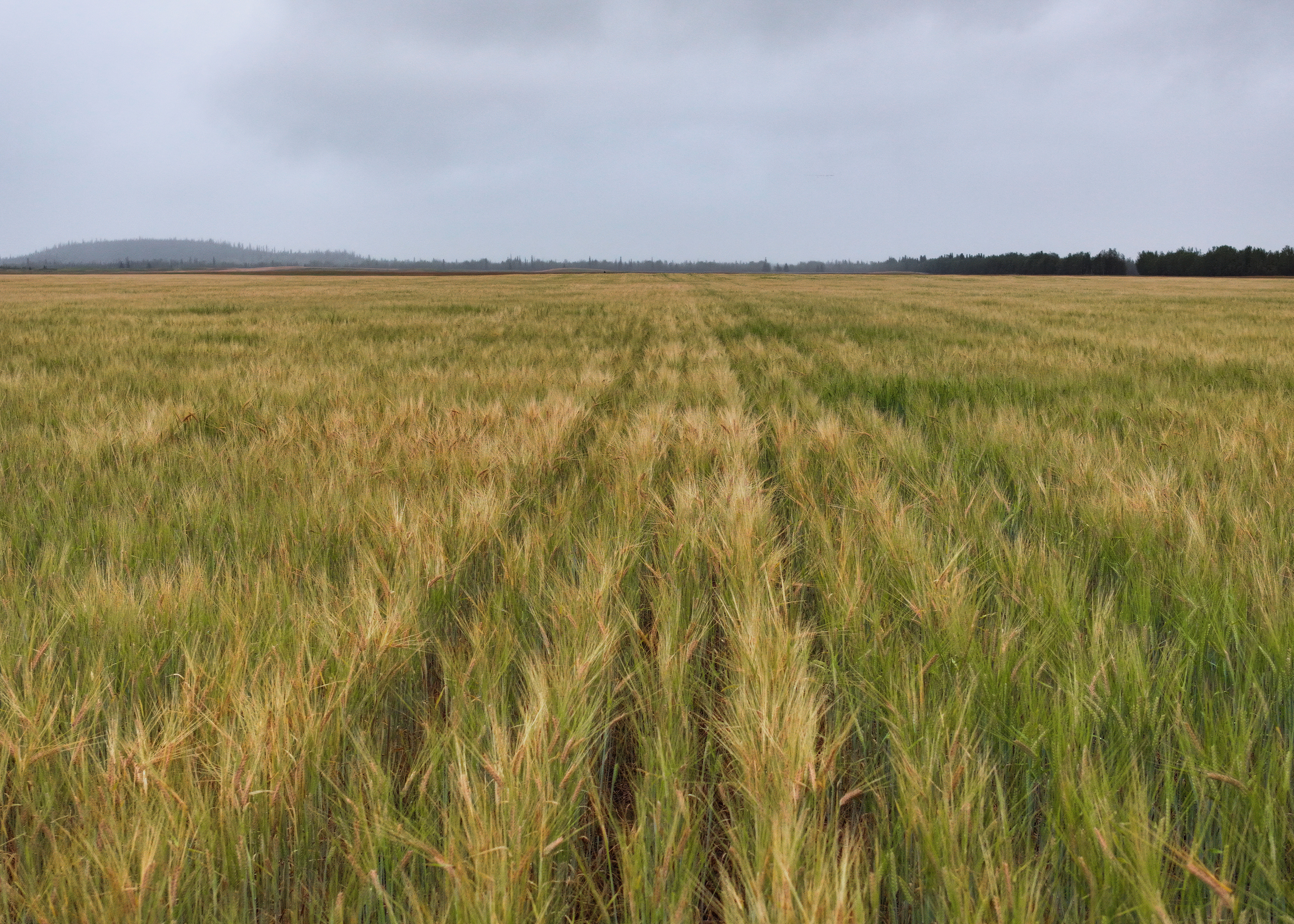
- Barley field off Clearwater Road

- Location within the state of Alaska
- Coordinates: 63°57′50″N 145°24′32″W
- Country: United States
- State: Alaska
- Census Area: Southeast Fairbanks

Government
  - State senator: Click Bishop (R)
  - State rep.: Mike Cronk (R)

Area
  - Total: 570.14 sq mi (1,476.65 km^{2})
  - Land: 568.18 sq mi (1,471.57 km^{2})
  - Water: 1.96 sq mi (5.08 km^{2})

Population (2020)
  - Total: 2,359
  - Density: 4.1/sq mi (1.6/km^{2})
- Time zone: UTC-9 (Alaska (AKST))
  - Summer (DST): UTC-8 (AKDT)
- ZIP code: 99737
- Area code: 907
- FIPS code: 02-18675

Deltana (Ukrainian: Делтана) is a census-designated place (CDP) in the Southeast Fairbanks Census Area, Alaska, United States. At the 2020 census, the population was 2,359, up from 2,251 in 2010. Native inhabitants are Tanana Athabaskans.

== History ==
In 1904, the U.S. Army Signal Corps built the McCarty Telegraph station on a site near a roadhouse established the previous year at the confluence of the Tanana and Delta rivers. The Chisana gold strike of 1913 brought many hopeful prospectors to the area. In the 1920s, many American bison were brought to the area, and in 1927, the name was changed to Buffalo Center.

In 1942, five miles south of Deltana, Fort Greely was constructed. Beef cattle were shipped during the 1950s, and during the 1970s, the local economy was given another boost with the completion of the trans-Alaska pipeline.

In 1980, 70,000 acres (280 km^{2}) of land were set aside as the Delta Bison Range to confine the bison and separate the expanding herd from local farmland.

== Geography ==
Deltana is located at 63°57′50″N 145°24′32″W (63.963825, -145.408931).

According to the United States Census Bureau, the CDP has a total area of 565.2 square miles (1,464 km^{2}), of which, 562.2 square miles (1,456 km^{2}) of it is land and 3.0 square miles (7.8 km^{2}) of it (0.52%) is water.

== Demographics ==
Historical population
Census	Pop.	Note	%±
2000	1,570		—
2010	2,251		43.4%
2020	2,359		4.8%
U.S. Decennial Census

Deltana first appeared on the 2000 U.S. Census as a census-designated place (CDP).

=== 2020 census ===
As of the 2020 census, Deltana had a population of 2,359. The median age was 40.3 years. 25.8% of residents were under the age of 18 and 17.7% of residents were 65 years of age or older. For every 100 females there were 105.5 males, and for every 100 females age 18 and over there were 107.6 males age 18 and over.

0.0% of residents lived in urban areas, while 100.0% lived in rural areas.

There were 891 households in Deltana, of which 32.0% had children under the age of 18 living in them. Of all households, 59.3% were married-couple households, 21.3% were households with a male householder and no spouse or partner present, and 15.3% were households with a female householder and no spouse or partner present. About 25.1% of all households were made up of individuals and 10.0% had someone living alone who was 65 years of age or older.

There were 1,059 housing units, of which 15.9% were vacant. The homeowner vacancy rate was 2.4% and the rental vacancy rate was 14.9%.

Racial composition as of the 2020 census
Race	Number	Percent
White	2,032	86.1%
Black or African American	26	1.1%
American Indian and Alaska Native	57	2.4%
Asian	32	1.4%
Native Hawaiian and Other Pacific Islander	2	0.1%
Some other race	58	2.5%
Two or more races	152	6.4%
Hispanic or Latino (of any race)	116	4.9%

=== 2000 census ===
As of the 2000 census, there were 1,570 people, 539 households, and 417 families residing in the CDP. The population density was 2.8 inhabitants per square mile (1.1/km^{2}). There were 669 housing units at an average density of 1.2 per square mile (0.46/km^{2}). The racial makeup of the CDP was 91.6% White, 1.2% Black or African American, 0.9% Native American, 1.1% Asian, 0.4% from other races, and 4.8% from two or more races. 1.2% of the population were Hispanic or Latino of any race.

There were 539 households, out of which 36.5% had children under the age of 18 living with them, 69.2% were married couples living together, 5.0% had a female householder with no husband present, and 22.6% were non-families. 19.1% of all households were made up of individuals, and 6.1% had someone living alone who was 65 years of age or older. The average household size was 2.87, and the average family size was 3.30.

In the CDP, the population was spread out, with 31.4% under the age of 18, 6.9% from 18 to 24, 23.5% from 25 to 44, 30.9% from 45 to 64, and 7.3% who were 65 years of age or older. The median age was 39 years. For every 100 females, there were 107.4 males. For every 100 females age 18 and over, there were 105.9 males.

=== Income ===
The median income for a household in the CDP was $50,066, and the median income for a family was $53,021. Males had a median income of $42,500 versus $31,042 for females. The per capita income for the CDP was $18,446. About 12.1% of families and 15.1% of the population were below the poverty line, including 19.9% of those under age 18 and 0.9% of those age 65 or over.

=== Ancestry ===
Deltana has the second highest percentage of residents, having been born in Ukraine in the United States at 8.4%, with an even higher total percentage of residents being Ukrainians or having Ukrainian ancestry.
