= Alaska Division of Homeland Security & Emergency Management =

- Motto: “...through partnerships, leading the way in emergency management"

Agency overview
- Formed: 2004
- Preceding agencies: Division of Emergency Services within the Department of Military and Veterans Affairs.; Alaska Division of Homeland Security
- Type: Homeland Security
- Jurisdiction: Alaska
- Headquarters: Fort Richardson, Alaska
- Parent agency: Alaska Department of Military and Veterans Affairs
- Website: ready.alaska.gov

Alaska Division of Homeland Security & Emergency Management (Alaska DHS) was created in early 2004 from the merger of the Alaska Division of Homeland Security which was created in March 2003 under the Alaska Disaster Act and the Emergency Services within the Department of Military and Veterans Affairs which was created in 1977. The purpose of the Alaska's Division of Homeland Security and Emergency Management is to protect Alaskans and their property from terrorism and all other hazards, as well as to provide rapid recovery from all disasters.

From its list of duties assigned in the Alaska Disaster Act, DHS&EM is the foremost agency within the executive branch of the state government of Alaska for assisting the governor of Alaska to fulfill the statutory responsibility of "meeting the dangers presented by disasters to the State and its people."
