= Southeast Fairbanks Census Area, Alaska =

Census area in Alaska, United States

- Borough
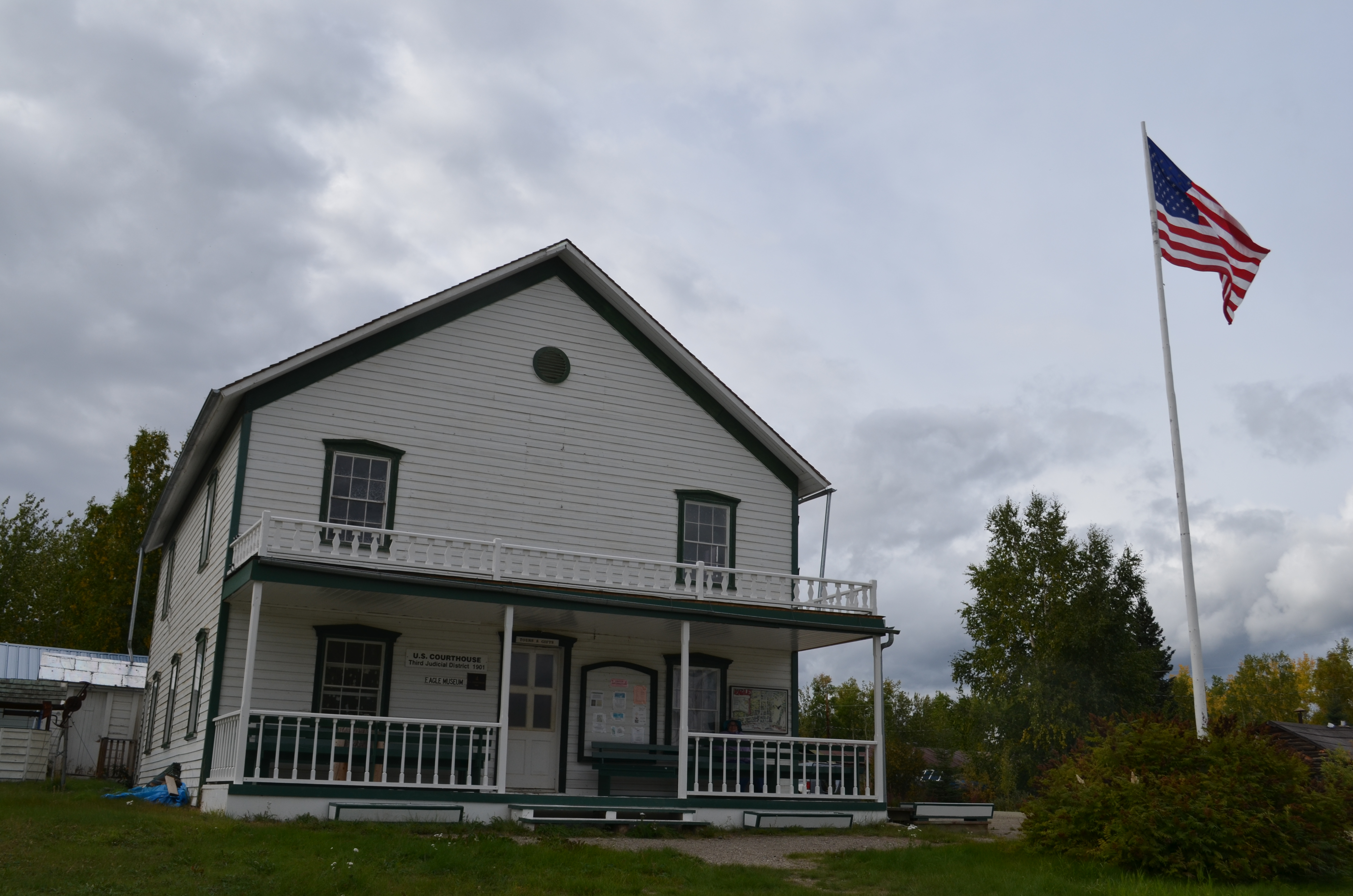
- Historic Courthouse in Eagle, Alaska

- Location within the U.S. state of Alaska
- Coordinates: 63°46′N 143°36′W
- Country: United States
- State: Alaska
- Established: 1980
- Named for: its location to the southeast of Fairbanks, Alaska
- Largest CDP: Deltana

Area
  - Total: 25,059 sq mi (64,900 km^{2})
  - Land: 24,769 sq mi (64,150 km^{2})
  - Water: 291 sq mi (750 km^{2}) 1.2%

Population (2020)
  - Total: 6,808
  - Estimate (2025): 7,270 ▲
  - Density: 0.28/sq mi (0.11/km^{2})
- Time zone: UTC−9 (Alaska)
  - Summer (DST): UTC−8 (ADT)
- Congressional district: At-large

Southeast Fairbanks Census Area is a census area located in the U.S. state of Alaska. As of the 2020 census, the population was 6,808, down from 7,029 in 2010. It is part of the unorganized borough and therefore has no borough seat. Its largest communities are Deltana and Tok, both unincorporated CDPs.

== Geography ==
According to the U.S. Census Bureau, the census area has a total area of 25,059 square miles (64,900 km^{2}), of which 24,769 square miles (64,150 km^{2}) is land and 291 square miles (750 km^{2}) (1.2%) is water. For comparison, it is slightly bigger than the state of West Virginia.

=== Adjacent boroughs and census areas ===
- Fairbanks North Star Borough, Alaska – Northwest
- Yukon-Koyukuk Census Area, Alaska – North
- Copper River Census Area, Alaska – South
- Matanuska-Susitna Borough, Alaska – Southwest
- Denali Borough, Alaska – West
- Yukon Territory, Canada – East

=== National protected areas ===
- Tetlin National Wildlife Refuge (part)
- Wrangell-St. Elias National Park and Preserve (part)
  - Wrangell-Saint Elias Wilderness (part)
- Yukon-Charley Rivers National Preserve (part)

== Politics ==
Southeast Fairbanks is one of the most Republican parts of Alaska, frequently giving Republican candidates well over 70% of the vote. Southeast Fairbanks has consistently mirrored Alaska's overall electoral preferences, voting for the statewide winner in every presidential election since Alaska's statehood in 1960. Donald Trump received the highest share of the vote ever out of any candidate in Southeast Fairbanks in 2024 with 81.9%.

United States presidential election results for Southeast Fairbanks Census Area, Alaska
Year	Republican		Democratic		Third party(ies)	
Year	No.	%	No.	%	No.	%
1960	365	55.14%	297	44.86%	0	0.00%
1964	258	32.74%	530	67.26%	0	0.00%
1968	454	49.13%	287	31.06%	183	19.81%
1972	562	59.28%	278	29.32%	108	11.39%
1976	803	53.93%	558	37.47%	128	8.60%
1980	1,158	59.08%	374	19.08%	428	21.84%
1984	1,855	77.10%	457	18.99%	94	3.91%
1988	1,522	67.58%	588	26.11%	142	6.31%
1992	1,158	43.91%	525	19.91%	954	36.18%
1996	1,532	61.50%	563	22.60%	396	15.90%
2000	2,128	73.71%	471	16.31%	288	9.98%
2004	1,668	77.01%	414	19.11%	84	3.88%
2008	2,766	79.80%	700	20.20%	0	0.00%
2012	2,249	72.81%	680	22.01%	160	5.18%
2016	2,441	71.10%	669	19.49%	323	9.41%
2020	2,823	76.19%	748	20.19%	134	3.62%
2024	2,846	81.90%	528	15.19%	101	2.91%

== Demographics ==
Historical population
Census	Pop.	Note	%±
1970	4,179		—
1980	5,676		35.8%
1990	5,913		4.2%
2000	6,174		4.4%
2010	7,029		13.8%
2020	6,808		−3.1%
2025 (est.)	7,270	▲	6.8%
U.S. Decennial Census; 1900–1990 1990–2000; 2010–2020

=== 2020 census ===
As of the 2020 census, the county had a population of 6,808 and a median age of 39.6 years. 23.3% of residents were under the age of 18 and 17.1% of residents were 65 years of age or older. For every 100 females there were 120.8 males, and for every 100 females age 18 and over there were 126.4 males age 18 and over.

The racial makeup of the county was 74.7% White, 1.1% Black or African American, 12.0% American Indian and Alaska Native, 1.3% Asian, 0.2% Native Hawaiian and Pacific Islander, 2.0% from some other race, and 8.7% from two or more races. Hispanic or Latino residents of any race comprised 5.5% of the population. The most reported ancestries were:

- German (10%)
- English (8%)
- Irish (7.8%)
- Russian (4.9%)
- Northway Village (3.1%)
- Ukrainian (2.8%)
- Native Village of Tetlin (2.6%)
- Mexican (2%)
- Puerto Rican (2%)
- Scottish (1.7%)

0.0% of residents lived in urban areas, while 100.0% lived in rural areas.

There were 2,445 households in the county, of which 29.8% had children under the age of 18 living with them and 17.9% had a female householder with no spouse or partner present. About 30.2% of all households were made up of individuals and 11.9% had someone living alone who was 65 years of age or older. There were 3,513 housing units, of which 30.4% were vacant. Among occupied housing units, 75.1% were owner-occupied and 24.9% were renter-occupied. The homeowner vacancy rate was 2.3% and the rental vacancy rate was 21.0%.

Southeast Fairbanks Census Area, Alaska – Racial and ethnic composition Note: the US Census treats Hispanic/Latino as an ethnic category. This table excludes Latinos from the racial categories and assigns them to a separate category. Hispanics/Latinos may be of any race.
Race / Ethnicity (NH = Non-Hispanic)	Pop 1980	Pop 1990	Pop 2000	Pop 2010	Pop 2020	% 1980	% 1990	% 2000	% 2010	% 2020
White alone (NH)	4,372	4,612	4,780	5,535	4,993	77.03%	78.00%	77.42%	78.75%	73.34%
Black or African American alone (NH)	278	284	118	71	68	4.90%	4.80%	1.91%	1.01%	1.00%
Native American or Alaska Native alone (NH)	725	762	777	797	795	12.77%	12.89%	12.59%	11.34%	11.68%
Asian alone (NH)	94	77	42	64	87	1.66%	1.30%	0.68%	0.91%	1.28%
Native Hawaiian or Pacific Islander alone (NH)	x	x	9	11	13	x	x	0.15%	0.16%	0.19%
Other race alone (NH)	8	1	4	6	23	0.14%	0.02%	0.06%	0.09%	0.34%
Mixed race or Multiracial (NH)	x	x	277	311	453	x	x	4.49%	4.42%	6.65%
Hispanic or Latino (any race)	199	177	167	234	376	3.51%	2.99%	2.70%	3.33%	5.52%
Total	5,676	5,913	6,174	7,029	6,808	100.00%	100.00%	100.00%	100.00%	100.00%

=== 2000 census ===
As of the 2000 census, there were 6,174 people, 2,098 households, and 1,506 families living in the census area. The population density was 0.25 people per square mile (0.097 people/km^{2}). There were 3,225 housing units at an average density of 0.13 per square mile (0.050/km^{2}). The racial makeup of the census area was 78.99% White, 1.98% Black or African American, 12.71% Native American, 0.68% Asian, 0.15% Pacific Islander, 0.73% from other races, and 4.76% from two or more races. 2.70% of the population were Hispanic or Latino of any race. 4.29% reported speaking an Athabaskan language at home, while 4.02% speak Russian, 3.76% Ukrainian, and 2.34% Spanish.

Of the 2,098 households, 39.40% had children under the age of 18 living with them, 58.20% were married couples living together, 8.60% had a female householder with no husband present, and 28.20% were non-families. 23.50% of households were one person, and 5.50% were one person aged 65 or older. The average household size was 2.80 and the average family size was 3.34.

In the census area, the population was spread out, with 32.80% under the age of 18, 7.60% from 18 to 24, 27.80% from 25 to 44, 25.70% from 45 to 64, and 6.10% 65 or older. The median age was 34 years. For every 100 females, there were 107.20 males. For every 100 females age 18 and over, there were 108.60 males.

== Communities ==
=== Cities ===
- Delta Junction
- Eagle

=== Census-designated places ===
- Alcan Border
- Big Delta
- Chicken
- Deltana
- Dot Lake
- Dot Lake Village
- Dry Creek
- Eagle Village
- Fort Greely
- Healy Lake
- Northway
- Northway Junction (former)
- Northway Village (former)
- Tanacross
- Tetlin
- Tok
- Whitestone

== See also ==
- List of airports in the Southeast Fairbanks Census Area
