= List of boroughs and census areas in Alaska =

Boroughs and census areas of Alaska
- Borough • City-borough • Census areas of the Unorganized Borough
- Location: State of Alaska
- Number: 19 organized boroughs 11 census areas
- Populations: (Organized boroughs): 672 (Yakutat) – 287,155 (Anchorage) (Census areas): 2,271 (Hoonah-Angoon) – 18,391 (Bethel)
- Areas: (Organized boroughs): 434 square miles (1,120 km^{2}) (Skagway) – 88,824 square miles (230,050 km^{2}) (North Slope) (Census areas): 4,393 square miles (11,380 km^{2}) (Aleutians West) – 145,576 square miles (377,040 km^{2}) (Yukon–Koyukuk)
- Government: Borough government
- Subdivisions: Communities, consolidated city-borough

The U.S. state of Alaska is divided into 19 organized boroughs and 11 census areas in the Unorganized Borough. Boroughs and census areas are both treated as county equivalents (Note: Alaska is one of three states in the United States in which the primary county-level administrative division is not called a county. In Louisiana, these units are called parishes; in Connecticut, these units are called councils of government, although counties still have a legal existence there for certain purposes.) by the Census Bureau.

Delegates to the Alaska Constitutional Convention wanted to avoid the traditional county system and adopted their own unique model with different classes of boroughs varying in powers and duties. Many of the most densely populated regions of the state are part of Alaska's boroughs, which function similarly to counties in other states. There are four different classifications of organized boroughs: "Unified Home Rule" or "Non-unified Home Rule" (may exercise all legislative powers not prohibited by law or charter); "First Class" (may exercise any power not prohibited by law on a non-area wide basis by adopting ordinances); and "Second Class" (must gain voter approval for authority to exercise many non-area wide powers).

The organized boroughs do not cover all of Alaska. The area not part of any organized borough is referred to as the Unorganized Borough. The U.S. Census Bureau, in cooperation with the state, divides the Unorganized Borough into 11 census areas, each roughly corresponding to an election district, thus totaling 30 county equivalents. However, Census Areas exist solely for the purposes of statistical analysis and presentation; they have no government of their own. Some areas in the Unorganized Borough receive limited public services directly from the Alaska state government: usually law enforcement from the Alaska State Troopers and educational funding.

Seven consolidated city-borough governments exist—Juneau City and Borough, Skagway Municipality, Sitka City and Borough, Yakutat City and Borough, Wrangell City and Borough, Haines Borough, as well as the state's largest city, Anchorage. Though its legal name is the Municipality of Anchorage, it is considered a consolidated city-borough under state law.

The Federal Information Processing Standard (FIPS) 55-2,3,4 codes, which are used by the United States Census Bureau to uniquely identify states and counties, is provided with each entry. Alaska's code is 02, so each code is of the format 02XXX. The FIPS code for each county equivalent links to census data for that county equivalent. There are 30 divisions in Alaska.

== List of boroughs ==
Borough	FIPS code	Borough seat	Class	Est.	Origin	Etymology	Density (Pop/sq mi)	Population	Area	Map
Aleutians East Borough	013	Sand Point	Second	October 23, 1987	-	Its location in the east Aleutian Islands, which are themselves of uncertain linguistic origin; possibly derived from Chukchi word aliat ("island")	0.50	3,479	6,985 sq mi (18,091 km^{2})	State map highlighting Aleutians East Borough
Anchorage	020	(Consolidated city-borough)	Unified Home Rule	January 1, 1964	Anchorage Borough formed in 1964, merged with city in 1975 to form unified city-borough	Derived from the presence of a safe place to anchor and unload supplies for construction of the Alaska Railroad c. 1913, thereby creating a community.	168.22	287,155	1,707 sq mi (4,421 km^{2})	State map highlighting Anchorage
Bristol Bay Borough	060	Naknek	Second	October 2, 1962	-	Named in 1778 by Capt. James Cook for George Digby, 2nd Earl of Bristol.	1.76	847	482 sq mi (1,248 km^{2})	State map highlighting Bristol Bay Borough
Denali Borough	068	Healy	Home Rule	December 7, 1990	-	From Denali, the tallest North American mountain, which means "great one" in the Dena'ina language	0.13	1,616	12,641 sq mi (32,740 km^{2})	State map highlighting Denali Borough
Fairbanks North Star Borough	090	Fairbanks	Second	January 1, 1964	-	Named for its borough seat of Fairbanks, named in turn for Charles Fairbanks (1852–1918), U.S. Senator from Indiana and vice president under Theodore Roosevelt, and for Polaris, the North Star	12.81	93,972	7,335 sq mi (18,998 km^{2})	State map highlighting Fairbanks North Star Borough
Haines Borough	100	(Consolidated city-borough)	Home Rule	August 29, 1968 (Consolidated 2002)	-	After Haines, which was itself named for Mrs. Francina E. Haines (1819–1870), the key fundraiser for the construction of a Presbyterian mission in the town.	0.88	2,068	2,343 sq mi (6,068 km^{2})	State map highlighting Haines Borough
Juneau	110	(Consolidated city-borough)	Unified Home Rule	September 30, 1963	The cities of Juneau and Douglas merged with the surrounding borough to form the municipality in 1970	Joseph "Joe" Juneau (1836-1899), prospector and co-founder of the city.	11.69	31,609	2,704 sq mi (7,003 km^{2})	State map highlighting Juneau
Kenai Peninsula Borough	122	Soldotna	Second	January 1, 1964	-	The Kenai Peninsula, whose name may be derived from Kenayskaya, the Russian name for Cook Inlet.	3.87	61,951	16,017 sq mi (41,484 km^{2})	State map highlighting Kenai Peninsula Borough
Ketchikan Gateway Borough	130	Ketchikan	Second	September 6, 1963	-	The borough seat of Ketchikan and the borough's gateway location on the Alaska-Canada border.	2.79	13,549	4,857 sq mi (12,580 km^{2})	State map highlighting Ketchikan Gateway Borough
Kodiak Island Borough	150	Kodiak	Second	September 24, 1963	-	Named after Kodiak Island, which may itself be named for the Koniag people	1.85	12,387	6,689 sq mi (17,324 km^{2})	State map highlighting Kodiak Island Borough
Lake and Peninsula Borough	164	King Salmon	Home Rule	April 24, 1989	-	The borough's many large lakes, and the Alaska Peninsula	0.06	1,357	23,832 sq mi (61,725 km^{2})	State map highlighting Lake and Peninsula Borough
Matanuska-Susitna Borough	170	Palmer	Second	January 1, 1964	-	Named for the valley that the Matanuska and Susitna Rivers form.	4.80	118,666	24,707 sq mi (63,991 km^{2})	State map highlighting Matanuska-Susitna Borough
North Slope Borough	185	Utqiaġvik	Home Rule	July 2, 1972	-	The Alaska North Slope along the Brooks Range.	0.12	10,582	88,824 sq mi (230,053 km^{2})	State map highlighting North Slope Borough
Northwest Arctic Borough	188	Kotzebue	Home Rule	June 2, 1986	In 1986, residents of Kotzebue and 10 other area villages voted to form the Northwest Arctic Borough (with boundaries coincident with those of NANA), to be economically based on taxing the Red Dog mine, then under development.	Its geographic location and position above the Arctic Circle.	0.20	7,095	35,663 sq mi (92,367 km^{2})	State map highlighting Northwest Arctic Borough
Petersburg Borough	195	Petersburg	Home Rule	January 3, 2013	Incorporated after voters approved borough formation in December 2012.	Named for Norwegian immigrant Peter Buschmann (1849-1903), founder of the former city of Petersburg.	1.17	3,394	2,901 sq mi (7,514 km^{2})	State map highlighting Petersburg Borough
Sitka	220	(Consolidated city-borough)	Unified Home Rule	September 24, 1963	Unified with the city of Sitka in 1971.	Derived from Tlingit word Shee At'iká, meaning "People on the outside of Shee (Baranof Island)."	2.90	8,319	2,870 sq mi (7,433 km^{2})	State map highlighting Sitka
Skagway	230	(Consolidated city-borough)	First	June 5, 2007	-	Derived from Tlingit word Shgagwèi, meaning "a windy place with white caps on the water."	2.54	1,104	434 sq mi (1,124 km^{2})	State map highlighting Skagway
Unorganized Borough	-	-	-	October 1, 1961	The Borough Act of 1961 created The Unorganized Borough including all of Alaska not within a Unified, Home rule, First class or Second class borough.	A legal entity in Alaska, covering those parts of Alaska not within an incorporated borough; it is directly administered by the State of Alaska.	0.24	75,441	319,852 sq mi (828,413 km^{2})	State map highlighting Unorganized Borough
Wrangell	275	(Consolidated city-borough)	Unified Home Rule	May 30, 2008	Formerly part of Wrangell-Petersburg Census Area	Ferdinand von Wrangel, Russian administrator of Alaska, 1840-49.	0.79	2,007	2,556 sq mi (6,620 km^{2})	State map highlighting Wrangell
Yakutat	282	(Consolidated city-borough)	Home Rule	September 22, 1992	-	Yakutat Bay and the Yakutat Alaska Native people	0.09	672	7,623 sq mi (19,743 km^{2})	State map highlighting Yakutat

== Census areas in the Unorganized Borough ==
Map of Alaska highlighting the Unorganized Borough

Currently unique among the United States, Alaska is not entirely subdivided into organized county equivalents. The Unorganized Borough is the portion of the U.S. state of Alaska not contained in any of its 19 organized boroughs. While referred to as the "Unorganized Borough", it is not a borough itself. It encompasses over half of Alaska's area, 970,500 km^{2}. If the Unorganized Borough were a state in itself, it would be the largest state in the United States of America, larger than the rest of Alaska and larger than Texas or California. (374,712 mi^{2}). As of the 2025 Census estimate, 10% of Alaskans (75,441 people) reside in it.

For the 1980 census, the United States Census Bureau divided the Unorganized Borough into 12 census areas to facilitate census taking in the vast unorganized area. As new boroughs incorporate, these areas have been altered or eliminated to accommodate, such that there are currently 11 census areas:

Census area	FIPS code	Largest town (as of 2000)	Etymology	Density	Population	Area	Map
Aleutians West Census Area	016	Unalaska	Location in the western Aleutian Islands.	1.19	5,240	4,393 sq mi (11,378 km^{2})	State map highlighting Aleutians West Census Area
Bethel Census Area	050	Bethel	City of Bethel, the largest settlement in the census area, which is itself named for the Biblical term Bethel ("house of God").	0.45	18,391	40,627 sq mi (105,223 km^{2})	State map highlighting Bethel Census Area
Chugach Census Area	063	Valdez	The Chugach people (Part of Valdez–Cordova Census Area prior to January 02, 2019)	0.69	6,553	9,530 sq mi (24,683 km^{2})	State map highlighting Chugach Census Area
Copper River Census Area	066	Glennallen	The Copper River (Part of Valdez–Cordova Census Area prior to January 02, 2019)	0.11	2,666	24,692 sq mi (63,952 km^{2})	State map highlighting Copper River Census Area
Dillingham Census Area	070	Dillingham	The city of Dillingham, the largest settlement in the area, which was itself named after United States Senator Paul Dillingham (1843–1923), who had toured Alaska extensively with his Senate subcommittee in 1903.	0.24	4,483	18,334 sq mi (47,485 km^{2})	State map highlighting Dillingham Census Area
Hoonah–Angoon Census Area	105	Hoonah	The cities of Hoonah and Angoon	0.35	2,271	6,555 sq mi (16,977 km^{2})	State map highlighting Hoonah–Angoon Census Area
Kusilvak Census Area	158	Hooper Bay	Kusilvak Mountains (Known as Wade Hampton prior to 2015)	0.46	7,932	17,077 sq mi (44,229 km^{2})	State map highlighting Kusilvak Census Area
Nome Census Area	180	Nome	City of Nome, the largest settlement in the census area.	0.43	9,830	22,969 sq mi (59,489 km^{2})	State map highlighting Nome Census Area
Prince of Wales-Hyder Census Area	198	Craig	Prince of Wales Island and the town of Hyder (Known as Prince of Wales-Outer Ketchikan prior to the expansion of Ketchikan Gateway Borough in 2008)	1.10	5,777	5,268 sq mi (13,644 km^{2})	State map highlighting Prince of Wales-Hyder Census Area
Southeast Fairbanks Census Area	240	Deltana	Its location, southeast of Fairbanks	0.29	7,270	24,831 sq mi (64,312 km^{2})	State map highlighting Southeast Fairbanks Census Area
Yukon-Koyukuk Census Area	290	Fort Yukon	Yukon River ("great river" in Gwich’in), which flows through the census area; and the city of Koyukuk	0.03	5,028	145,576 sq mi (377,040 km^{2})	State map highlighting Yukon-Koyukuk Census Area

== Racial / Ethnic Profile of boroughs and census areas in Alaska (2020 Census) ==
Racial / Ethnic Profile of counties in Alaska (2020 Census)
Following is a table of counties in Alaska by race/ethnicity. The majority racial/ethnic group is coded per the key below.

Majority minority with no dominant group
Majority White
Majority Black
Majority Hispanic
Majority Asian
Majority Native American

Racial and ethnic composition of boroughs and census areas in Alaska (2020 Census) (NH = Non-Hispanic) Note: the US Census treats Hispanic/Latino as an ethnic category. This table excludes Latinos from the racial categories and assigns them to a separate category. Hispanics/Latinos may be of any race.
County	Location of County	Total Population	White alone (NH)	%	Black or African American alone (NH)	%	Native American or Alaska Native alone (NH)	%	Asian alone (NH)	%	Pacific Islander alone (NH)	%	Other race alone (NH)	%	Mixed race or Multiracial (NH)	%	Hispanic or Latino (any race)	%
Aleutians East		3,420	658	19.24%	297	8.68%	797	23.30%	771	22.54%	32	0.94%	11	0.32%	180	5.26%	674	19.71%
Aleutians West		5,232	1,585	30.29%	257	4.91%	709	13.55%	1,502	28.71%	238	4.55%	10	0.19%	263	5.03%	668	12.77%
Anchorage		291,247	158,232	54.33%	13,777	4.73%	22,480	7.72%	27,281	9.37%	9,844	3.38%	1,922	0.66%	31,273	10.74%	26,438	9.08%
Bethel		18,666	1,628	8.72%	84	0.45%	15,580	83.47%	201	1.08%	2	0.01%	19	0.10%	945	5.06%	207	1.11%
Bristol Bay		844	357	42.30%	6	0.71%	296	35.07%	5	0.59%	3	0.36%	2	0.24%	130	15.40%	45	5.33%
Chugach		7,102	4,768	67.14%	46	0.65%	657	9.25%	527	7.42%	61	0.86%	26	0.37%	620	8.73%	397	5.59%
Copper River		2,617	1,591	60.79%	6	0.23%	645	24.65%	17	0.65%	10	0.38%	15	0.57%	249	9.51%	84	3.21%
Denali		1,619	1,378	85.11%	9	0.56%	59	3.64%	13	0.80%	3	0.19%	4	0.25%	121	7.47%	32	1.98%
Dillingham		4,857	770	15.85%	19	0.39%	3,412	70.25%	45	0.93%	9	0.19%	7	0.14%	449	9.24%	146	3.01%
Fairbanks North Star		95,655	63,178	66.05%	3,804	3.98%	7,299	7.63%	3,031	3.17%	584	0.61%	812	0.85%	9,627	10.06%	7,320	7.65%
Haines		2,080	1,577	75.82%	2	0.10%	205	9.86%	14	0.67%	2	0.10%	9	0.43%	204	9.81%	67	3.22%
Hoonah-Angoon		2,365	1,123	47.48%	6	0.25%	841	35.56%	15	0.63%	4	0.17%	16	0.68%	240	10.15%	120	5.07%
Juneau		32,255	19,673	60.99%	328	1.02%	3,397	10.53%	2,086	6.47%	469	1.45%	183	0.57%	4,042	12.53%	2,077	6.44%
Kenai Peninsula		58,799	45,546	77.46%	361	0.61%	4,107	6.98%	793	1.35%	173	0.29%	372	0.63%	5,119	8.71%	2,328	3.96%
Ketchikan Gateway		13,948	8,221	58.94%	100	0.72%	2,264	16.23%	1,118	8.02%	26	0.19%	93	0.67%	1,476	10.58%	650	4.66%
Kodiak Island		13,101	6,291	48.02%	85	0.65%	1,759	13.43%	2,781	21.23%	107	0.82%	74	0.56%	980	7.48%	1,024	7.82%
Kusilvak		8,368	173	2.07%	16	0.19%	7,946	94.96%	23	0.27%	0	0.00%	14	0.17%	182	2.17%	14	0.17%
Lake and Peninsula		1,476	297	20.12%	1	0.07%	993	67.28%	7	0.47%	0	0.00%	0	0.00%	144	9.76%	34	2.30%
Matanuska-Susitna		107,081	81,050	75.69%	1,059	0.99%	6,531	6.10%	1,515	1.41%	476	0.44%	785	0.73%	10,421	9.73%	5,244	4.90%
Nome		10,046	1,393	13.87%	52	0.52%	7,508	74.74%	109	1.09%	5	0.05%	25	0.25%	768	7.64%	186	1.85%
North Slope		11,031	2,964	26.87%	159	1.44%	5,680	51.49%	636	5.77%	321	2.91%	30	0.27%	693	6.28%	548	4.97%
Northwest Arctic		7,793	684	8.78%	71	0.91%	6,453	82.81%	53	0.68%	11	0.14%	0	0.00%	419	5.38%	102	1.31%
Petersburg		3,398	2,444	71.92%	46	1.35%	231	6.80%	117	3.44%	12	0.35%	21	0.62%	363	10.68%	164	4.83%
Prince of Wales-Hyder		5,753	2,368	41.16%	21	0.37%	2,529	43.96%	25	0.43%	30	0.52%	16	0.28%	604	10.50%	160	2.78%
Sitka		8,458	5,050	59.71%	37	0.44%	1,206	14.26%	573	6.77%	14	0.17%	53	0.63%	1,024	12.11%	501	5.92%
Skagway		1,240	1,056	85.16%	6	0.48%	23	1.85%	39	3.15%	0	0.00%	6	0.48%	69	5.56%	41	3.31%
Southeast Fairbanks		6,808	4,993	73.34%	68	1.00%	795	11.68%	87	1.28%	13	0.19%	23	0.34%	453	6.65%	376	5.52%
Wrangell		2,127	1,341	63.05%	0	0.00%	368	17.30%	25	1.18%	2	0.09%	11	0.52%	304	14.29%	76	3.57%
Yakutat		662	248	37.46%	2	0.30%	250	37.76%	32	4.83%	1	0.15%	0	0.00%	100	15.11%	29	4.38%
Yukon-Koyukuk		5,343	1,121	20.98%	6	0.11%	3,818	71.46%	8	0.15%	3	0.06%	16	0.30%	299	5.60%	72	1.35%

== See also ==
- List of cities in Alaska
- List of census-designated places in Alaska
- List of United States counties and county equivalents
