= Baker Creek (Alaska) =

Coordinates: 64.9714°N 150.4708°W

Baker Creek is a right bank tributary of the Tanana River in the U.S. state of Alaska. Baker Creek tributaries include Thanksgiving, Gold Run, Eureka, and Pioneer creeks; Seattle Junior Creek is a tributary of Pioneer Creek. The Baker Creek diggings of the early 20th century were situated approximately 30 miles (48 km) south of Rampart.

== Geography ==
The creek flows along the southwestern side of a large flat, 7–10 miles (11–16 km) broad in its widest part, and approximately 10 miles (16 km) long. Its longer extensions are northeast–southwest in the line of flow of Eureka and Hutlina creeks. Instead of sharp canyon-like valleys, the streams flow through open valleys, and where they flow in general parallel to the Baker-Minook divide—that is, approaching a northeast–southwest or an east–west direction—the southern bank is steep, while the northern one is gently sloping, the creeks flowing close to the steeper side. Even along the broad Baker Flats, this feature is still prominent. The north side is a long gentle slope toward the divide, rising more sharply in its upper part, while across the flats the southern side may be seen rising abruptly from the valley floor.

There are several main streams within the Baker Creek gold area. Eureka Creek, lying next to the Baker-Minook divide, flows southwesterly for about 5 miles (8.0 km), then turns to the south. Pioneer Creek flows parallel to Eureka between 1 and 2 miles (1.6 and 3.2 km) to the southeast and joins it on Baker Flats. Rhode Island Creek flows in a southerly direction, about 1.5 miles (2.4 km) west of Eureka Creek, Omega Creek in the western part of the gold area. Into these creeks flow all of the smaller creeks of the area along the Baker-Minook divide. The streams are all small, many of the smaller ones being ordinarily dry during the summer and fall. The gradient of the larger streams is comparatively low and water reaches the benches with difficulty.

== History ==
Baker Creek was named by Henry Tureman Allen in 1885; it is reportedly the same waterway as Ivan Petrof's Saklekageta of 1880. Gold was discovered in the Baker Creek area on Eureka Creek, where mining was begun during the winter of 1898-99 and a small amount was taken out. On Glenn Creek, gold was discovered in July, 1901, on the benches along Pioneer Creek in 1902, on Thanksgiving Creek in February, 1903, and other discoveries were made during the summer of 1904.
