= Delta River =

River in Alaska, United States

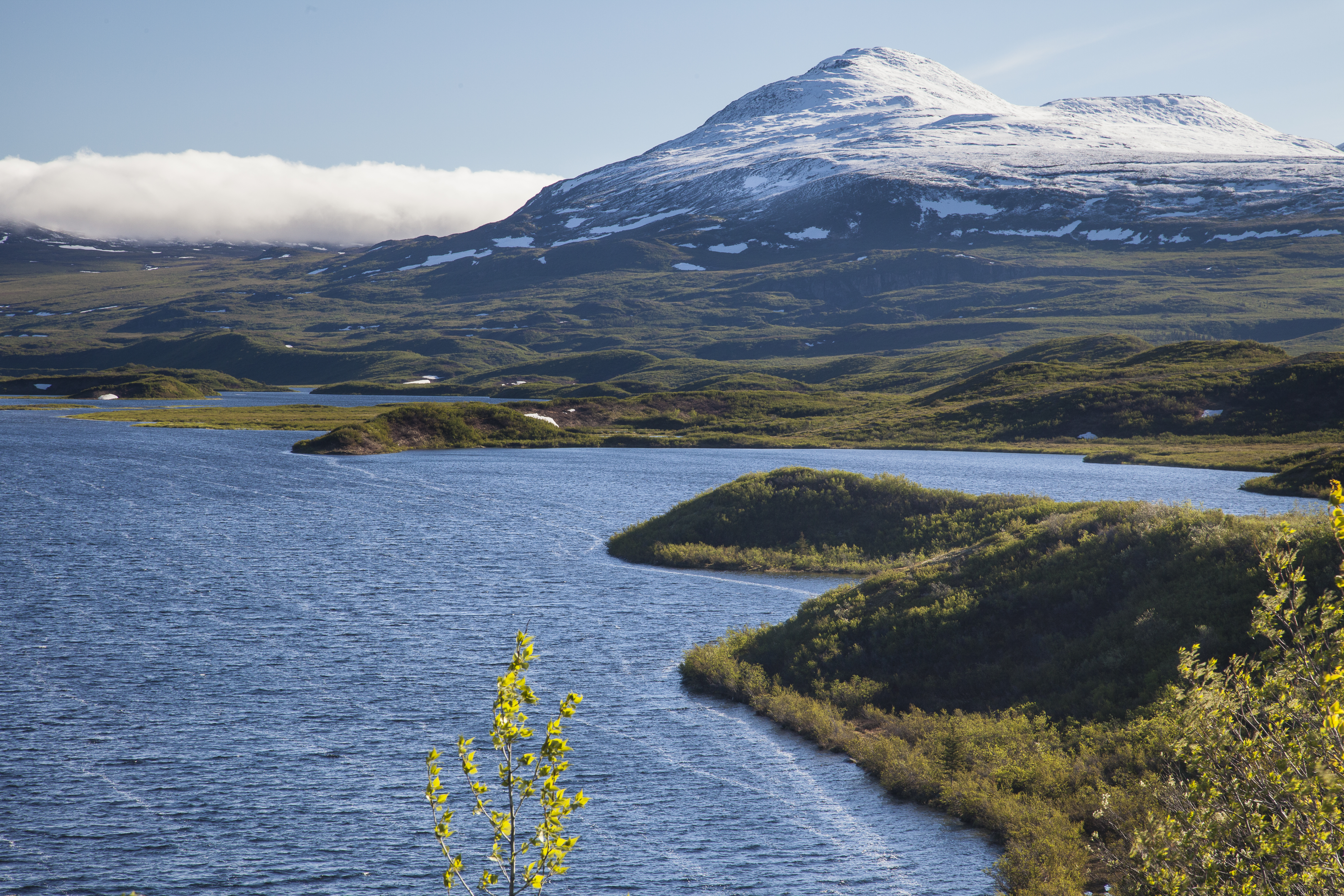
- The Delta River in the Alaska Range

Location
- Country: United States
- State: Alaska

Physical characteristics
- Source: Lower Tangle Lake
  - coordinates: 63°09′14″N 145°56′54″W
- Mouth: Tanana River, near Big Delta, Alaska
  - coordinates: 64°09′19″N 145°51′35″W
- Length: 80 miles (130 km)

Basin features
- Tributaries
  - left: Eureka Creek
  - right: Phelan Creek, Jarvis Creek

National Wild and Scenic River
- Type: Wild, Scenic, Recreational
- Designated: December 2, 1980

The Delta River (Middle Tanana: Niithaayh Ndiige; Ahtena: Dzeł Ghatggey Na' or Saas Na') is a river in eastern Alaska, United States. It is a tributary of the Tanana River, and by extension the Yukon. Originating from the Tangle Lakes, the river flows north through the Alaska Range, carving a valley perpendicular to the east-west mountain range. Initially clear and slow-moving, it becomes faster and silty after taking in Eureka Creek, its first major tributary. As it flows through the Alaska Range, it takes in meltwater from various glaciers and glacier-fed streams. At the end of its roughly 80-mile (130 km) course, the river meets the Tanana near the settlements of Big Delta and Delta Junction. The geology of the basin is highly complex, with various glacier-shaped landforms and alluvial deposits from the river. Dust from the river valley is spread by the wind and forms a layer of loess to the west of the river. The river basin is home to various birds, mammals (including caribou), and plants, while the water hosts fish such as northern pike and arctic grayling.

The uppermost portions of the Delta River basin are in the Tangle Lakes Archaeological District, containing over 600 documented archaeological sites, with the earliest occupation appearing to be from over 10,000 years ago. The Upper Tanana Athabaskans and the Ahtna both lived in the basin and hunted around it. In 1885, American army officer Henry Tureman Allen explored the river and named it for its braided water channels. Gold mining and road construction took place in the river valley during the early 1900s, followed by the construction of the Richardson Highway running parallel to the river. Agricultural development projects were made around the river during the 1970s and 1980s, although most of the river basin remains wilderness under the administration of the Bureau of Land Management and the Alaska Department of Natural Resources. A portion of the upper Delta River was designated a National Wild and Scenic River in 1985.

== Course ==
The Delta River flows for about 80 mi (130 km) through central Alaska, flowing north through Isabel Pass in the Alaska Range to the Tanana River. The source of the river is Lower Tangle Lake, the lowest of the Tangle Lakes chain to the west of Paxson, Alaska.

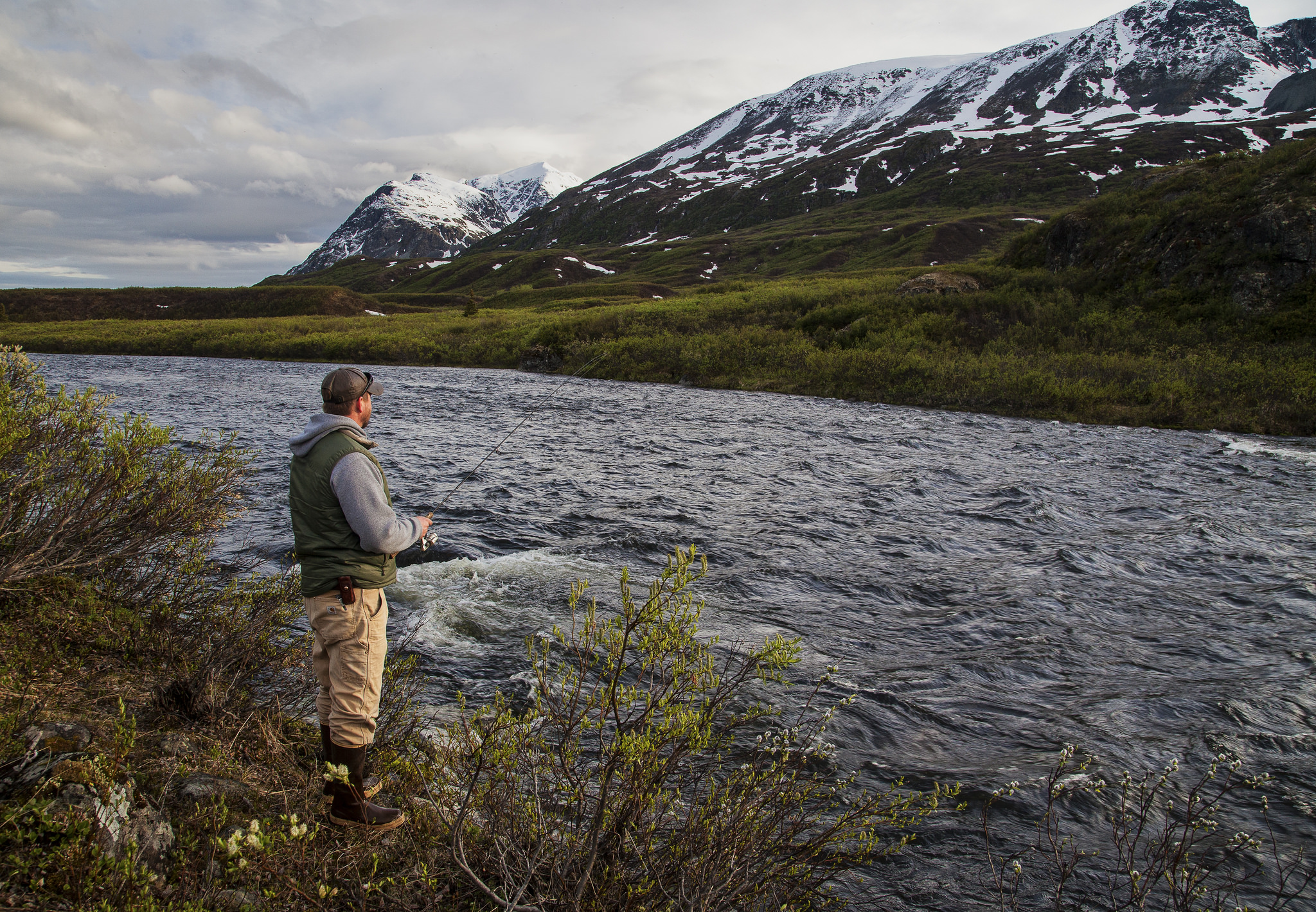
A fisherman by the Delta River in its pass through the Alaska Range

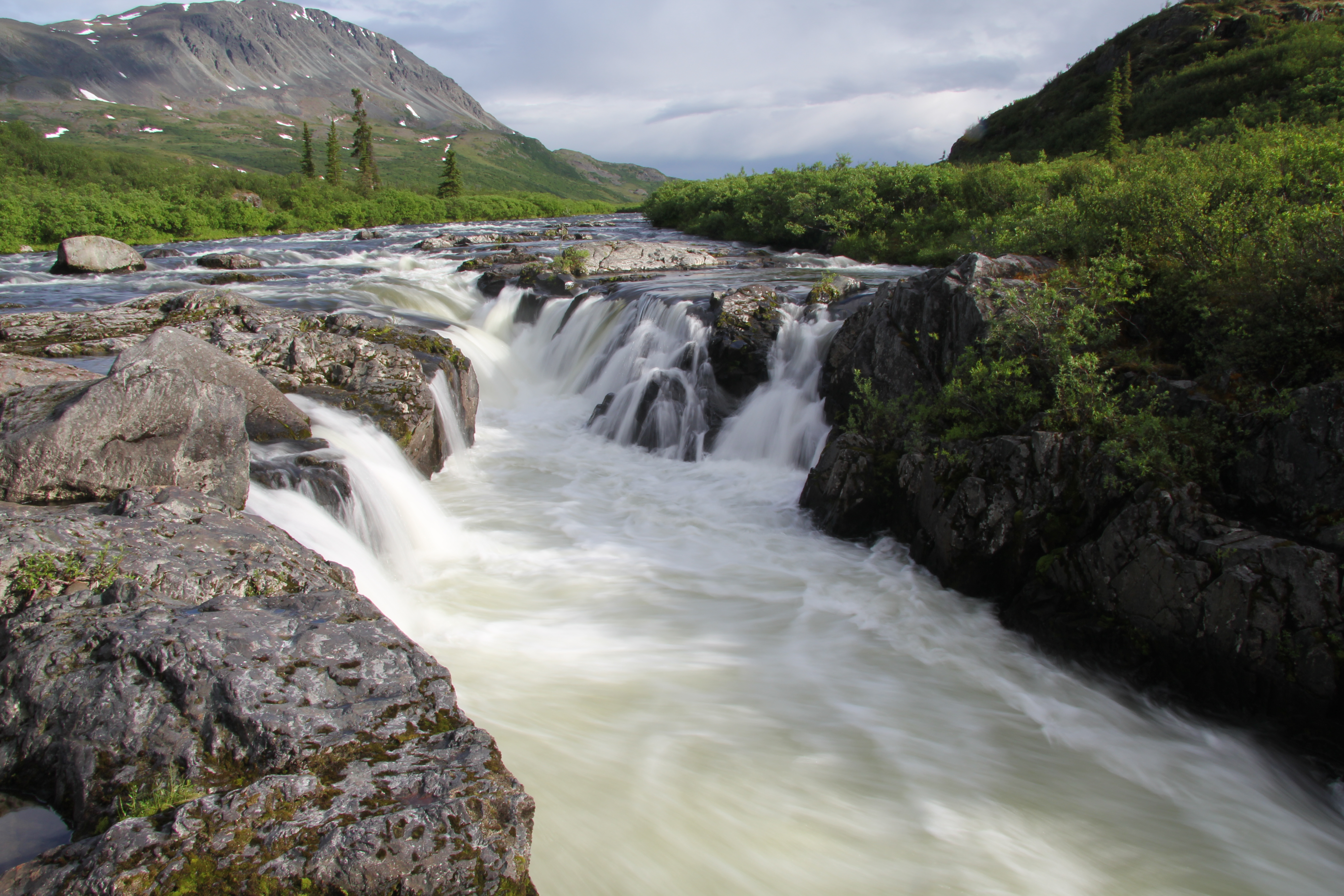
A waterfall in the upper Delta River

From its source, the Delta flows at a low velocity for about 2 mi (3 km) north, through a series of small pools and riffles, before descending a 15 ft (4.6 m) waterfall. After this fall, the river narrows from 130 to 60 ft (40 to 18 m) in width and gains an increased velocity. About 4 mi (6 km) upstream from the falls, the river slows and widens again, splitting into several channels with sand and gravel bottoms. About another mile further upstream, it slows more, and widens to a channel about 100 ft (30 m) wide and 3 ft (1 m) deep.

About 10 mi (16 km) from its source, the Delta River receives its first major tributary along its western bank, Eureka Creek, which carries meltwater from various glaciers along the southern face of the Alaska Range. This is followed by various other minor tributary streams until its confluence with Phelan Creek 6 miles (10 km) upriver, which drains the Gulkana Glacier. After this, it enters a narrow pass running through the Alaska Range, and flows north through the mountains for about 13 miles (21 km), as it receives meltwater from glaciers and various steep mountain streams. Among the largest glaciers in the region, the Black Rapids Glacier, drains into the river at a site called Black Rapids. The average elevation of the river during this section is about 2,400 ft (730 m), flanked on either side by the adjacent mountains of the Alaska Range, which range in elevation from 6,000–9,000 ft (1,800–2,700 m) at their summits.

About 9 miles (14 km) after Black Rapids, the valley grows shallow, and the Delta runs through an expanse of glacial moraines for about 25 miles (40 km). After this, it flows through a wide stretch of glaciofluvial fans for the last 16 miles (26 km) of its course. At the beginning of this section, it lies in a valley that descends to up to 200 feet (60 m) beneath the surface of the fans, decreasing to about 50 feet (15 m) near its mouth. About 10 miles (16 km) from its mouth, the Delta takes in its last major tributary, the 40-mile (64 km) long Jarvis Creek, which originates from Jarvis Glacier on the north face of the Alaska Range. The Delta River meets the Tanana River adjacent to the settlement of Big Delta, Alaska, which eventually drains into the Yukon River and thus the Bering Sea.

== Hydrology ==
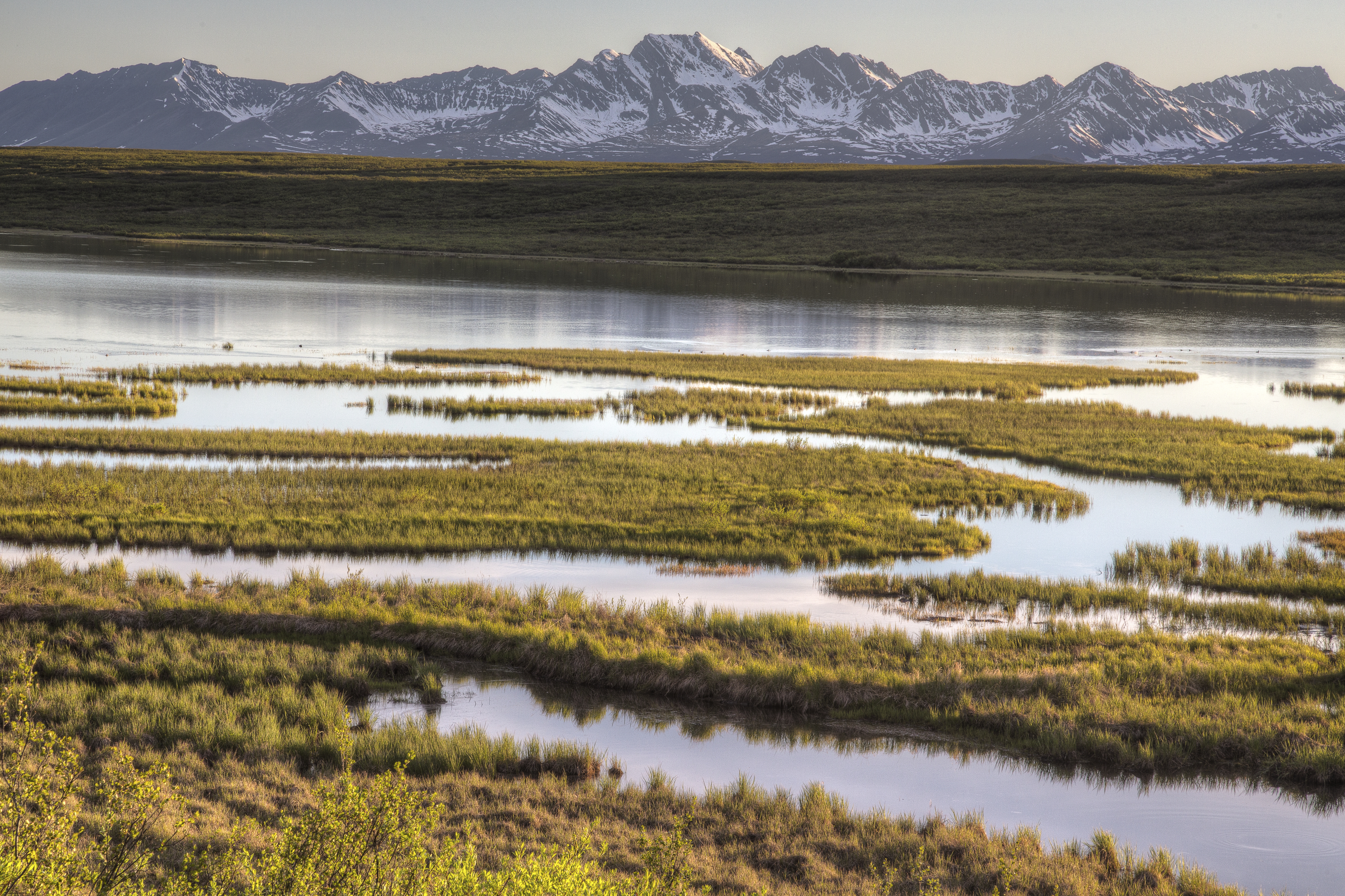
The Delta River is named for its heavily braided channels.

The water of the Delta River is extremely clear from its source to its confluence with Eureka Creek, after which it becomes more silty and fast-moving. Its broad flood plain is interrupted by various braided channels. It presents little flooding risk to communities along the river, as its western bank (on which no settlements are located) is lower than its east bank. However, lateral erosion along the eastern bank does pose a threat to homes and roads, prompting the installation of groynes (flow-regulating structures) along the bank by the early 1980s.

Large glaciers in the Alaska Range such as the Black Rapids Glacier, Canwell Glacier, and Castner Glacier run through the mountain valleys and drain into the Delta, as do various glacially-fed mountain streams.

=== Basin environment ===
The Delta's drainage basin spans around 1,665 square miles (4,310 km^{2}) of territory in central Alaska. It covers portions of four of Alaska's physiographic provinces as defined by Clyde Wahrhaftig's 1965 survey. It begins in the Gulkana Upland, a series of high ridges separated by wide, hummocky (mound-covered) valleys; at the southernmost portion of the region are the Amphitheater Mountains, which contain a few small cirque glaciers and snow fields, as well as small mountain streams which feed the Delta in the early portions of its course. To the north, the basin runs through the Alaska Range itself, a rugged mountain range drained by glaciers on its northern and southern faces. A stretch of the Northern Foothills of the Alaska Range also lies within the drainage basin, comprising a series of flat-topped ridges running in parallel to the mountains. The lowest portion of the drainage basin is within the outwash plains of glaciofluvial deposits along the southern floodplains of the Tanana River, defined as part of the Tanana-Kuskokwim Lowland.

The basin is in a subarctic climate, where temperatures can reach below −50 °F (−46 °C) during the winter. Daily high temperatures during the summer can occasionally exceed 80 °F (27 °C), although freezing temperatures have been recorded in all months. Freezing temperatures are generally reached in October, with the spring thaw emerging around late May or early June. Summers are short, dry, and relatively warm, while winters are long and cold.

=== Groundwater ===
Alluvial fans near the Delta and Gerstle River create a large aquifer in the surrounding region. Although the lower portions of the Delta River receive some groundwater discharge, both the Delta and Jarvis Creek ultimately lose water to it, serving as a source of groundwater recharge. Snowmelt during the summer results in the water table rising more than 19 feet (6 m), which falls again during the winter as meltwater streams dry up.

Within the surrounding region, discontinuous permafrost can be found. In some areas, it is found directly below the surface, while the permafrost layer can begin as deep as 216 ft (66 m) in others. Permafrost is absent from the area directly adjacent to and beneath the Delta River itself. Shallow permafrost causes poor drainage and wet soils on a local level, although its discontinuous nature prevents large-scale impediments to groundwater recharge.

== Geology ==
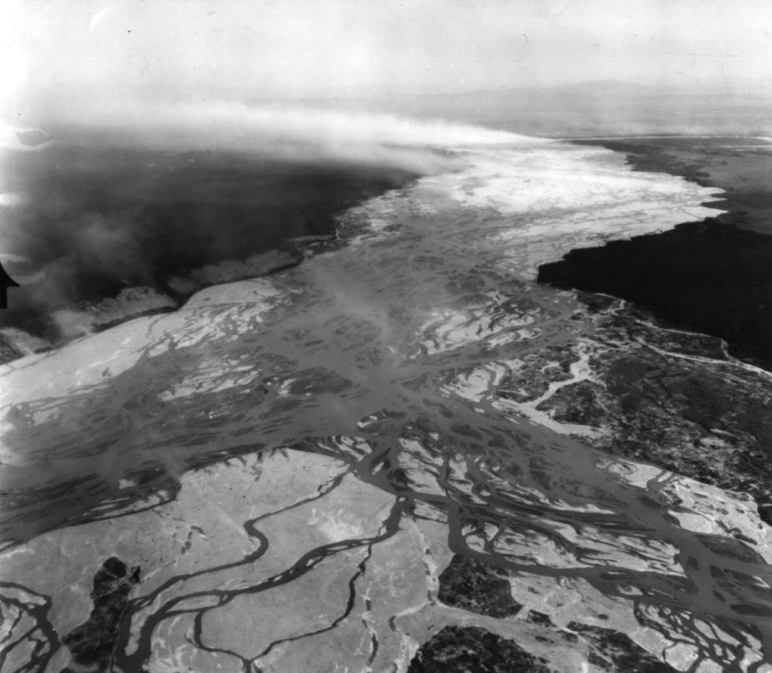
The lower Delta as seen from the air, showing clouds of silt carried by a strong east wind, 1948

The geology of the Delta River area is highly complex, including both Precambrian-era metamorphic rocks and recent volcanic and alluvial deposits. Much of the region is in the Wrangellia Composite Terrane, a crust fragment containing primarily oceanic rocks, with basalts, carbonate rocks, and mafic and ultramafic rocks as intrusives. Various glacial deposits from the Quaternary period are found throughout the area, forming eskers, moraines, kettles, kames, and outwash plains.

Besides the Delta, three other rivers cut a north-south track through the Alaska Range: the Nenana, Nabesna, and the Chisana. These likely predated the uplift of the Alaska Range around 25 million years ago, eroding a valley along their original course as the range rose.

The upper portions of the basin, between the Alaska Range and the Amphitheater Mountains, contain large amounts of economically-useful minerals, such as platinum group metals, nickel, cobalt, and copper. Small-scale mining operations have occasionally mined gold in the region.

=== Soils and sediment ===
The soils of the Delta River basin consist of brown forest soil, permafrosted gleysol (grayish waterlogged soil), alpine podzol, and lithosols (shallow, rocky soils). The brown forest soil is mainly found at low elevations, while the lithosols and alpine podzols are found at high elevation in the mountains. Gleysol is generally found in depressions in the central and southern parts of the basin. Organic deposits such as peat are found across the river basin, especially in depressions along the flood plains and terraces. Peat deposits in nearby bogs and fens can reach several feet in thickness.

Much of the region in the Delta River basin north of the Alaska Range is covered in a layer of loess (sediment consisting of wind-blown dust), originating in the floodplains of the Delta River and Jarvis Creek. This layer ranges from 4 to 40 ft (1 to 12 m) thick in the area west of the river, but is generally less than 1 ft (30 cm) thick in the area east of it. The loess began to be rapidly deposited after the end of the Last Glacial Period around 12,000 years ago, as the receding glaciers exposed the ground. Loess accumulation from flood plain sediment continues, with the thickest deposits on hills in the northern basin.

== Biology ==
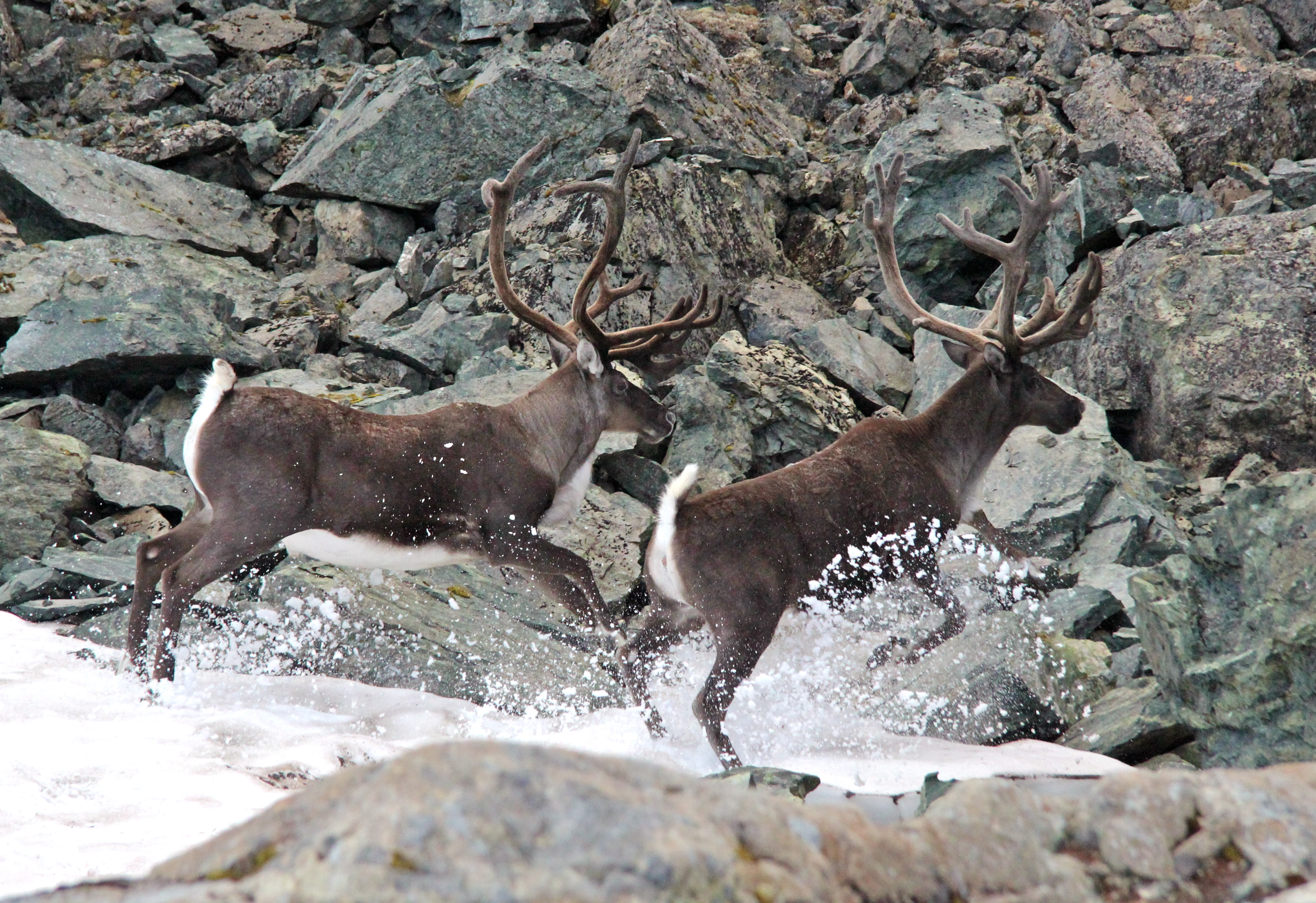
Two caribou running across the river

About 33 species of mammals are attested in the Delta River basin. These include caribou of the Nelchina herd, Dall sheep, and moose. Black bears are frequently found on the flood plains and stream terraces, while grizzly bears are mainly found in the uplands, descending into the river valley during salmon spawning season. Foxes, wolves, lynx, snowshoe hares, martens, otters, and wolverines found in the basin are common targets for hunters and trappers. Bison live in the area north of the Alaska Range, between the Delta River and the Gerstle River.

About 135 species of birds migrate to the Alaska Interior during the summer months, with around 35 more arriving in other parts of the year. Waterfowl such as tundra swans nest in lakes and ponds in the river basin, while bald eagles nest and fish along the river. Spruce grouse are frequently found in the basin's spruce forests. The BLM-protected trumpeter swan can be found in the Tangle Lake wetlands.

Fish known to inhabit the Delta River include northern pike, Alaska blackfish, burbot, longnose sucker, and slimy sculpin. The salmonoids attested in the basin are Arctic grayling, lake trout, Dolly Varden trout, coho salmon, least cisco, and Bering cisco. Salmon do not use the river to spawn, due to high falls and high amounts of silt entering the river from Eureka Creek.

The Danish-Canadian botanist Erling Porsild and his brother Robert Thorbjørn began botanical studies of the Delta River area in 1926, while hired by the Canadian government to monitor Arctic caribou populations. Much of the Delta River basin consists of spruce and birch forests, with black spruce and white spruce alongside paper birch, willows, and poplar trees. Larix laricina larch is found in the northern floodplains, while pockets of quaking aspen dot the basin. Plants such as Labrador tea, grasses, and sedges form the understory of the forests. Alpine regions of the basin consist of meadows, barrens, and conifer forests, with plants such as mountain hemlock, deer cabbage, heather, lichens, and shrubs.

== Human history ==
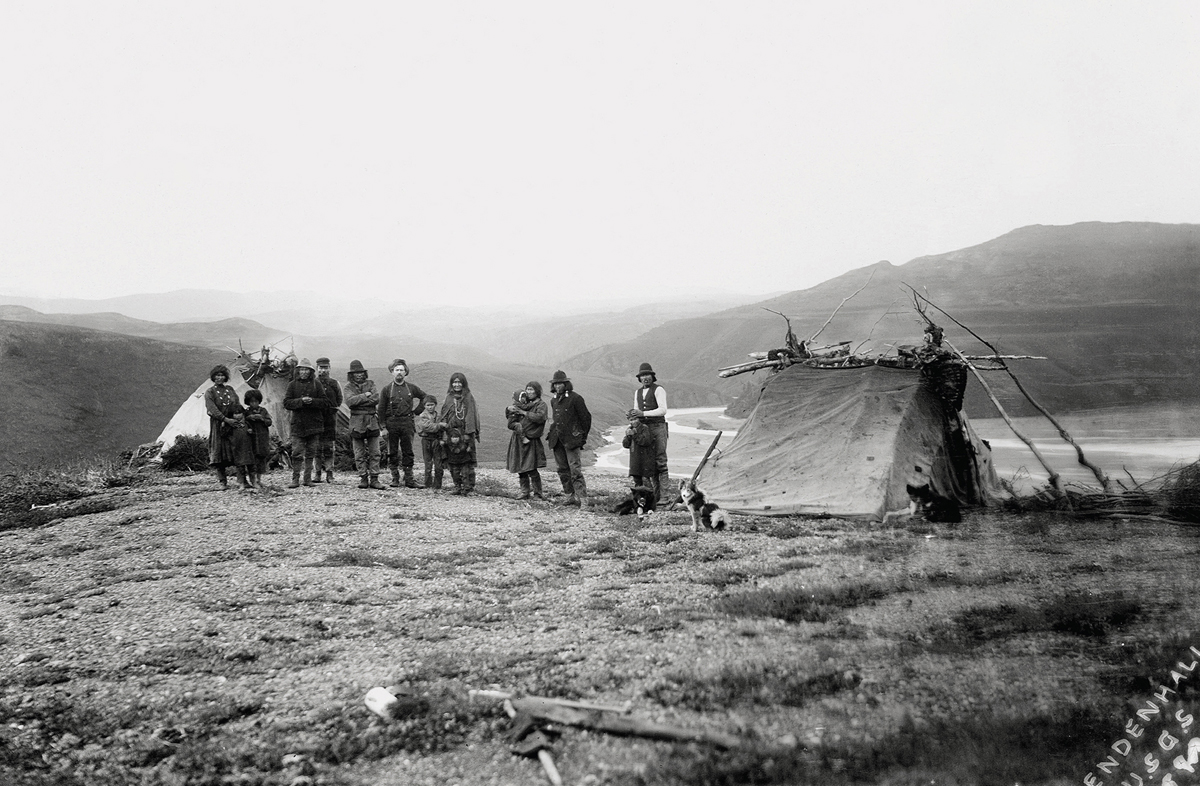
An Ahtna hunting camp near the source of the Delta River, 1898

The upper portions of the Delta River and its tributaries in the Tangle Lakes lie within the Tangle Lakes Archaeological District, a National Register of Historic Places district containing 600 documented archaeological sites. The sites contain artifacts from ancient hunter-gatherers, with occupation attested from over 10,000 years ago. Native hunting trails and routes ran through the Delta River valley, often passing over the tops of eskers and the rims of plateaus.

A band of the Upper Tanana Athabaskans lived on the north slopes of the Alaska Range along the lower Delta and Goodpaster Rivers, hunting caribou, dall sheep, and moose. The Ahtna, present across the Copper River basin to the south of the Alaska Range, lived in the portions of the Delta watershed above the Black Rapids. The Delta valley may have been the main route between the Upper Tanana and the Ahtna, who had overlapping territories in the region, as well as some trade and marriage relations. The photographer and adventurer James T. Geoghegan in 1904 recorded "Thothendig" as a native name for the river. The Middle Tanana name for the river is Niithaayh Ndiige, meaning "sandy gravel bed river", a name shared by the Johnson River and Delta Creek. One Ahtna name Saas Na', literally translated as "sand river", also reflects its sediment laden nature of the lower reaches. However, that name is uncommon. The more common Ahtna name is Dzeł Ghatggey Na', meaning "between the mountains river."

The American army officer Henry Tureman Allen named the Delta River during his 1885 expedition, naming it after its braided channels, which he found reminiscent of the networks of distributaries found in river deltas. An 1898 expedition by another army officer, Edwin Forbes Glenn, became the first westerners to travel through the Delta valley following advice from indigenous guides, who judged it to be the easiest route through the Alaska Range. Gold was discovered near Eureka Creek around 1900, prompting the creation of the Eureka Creek Mining District and around 250 miners to work in the area over the following decade.

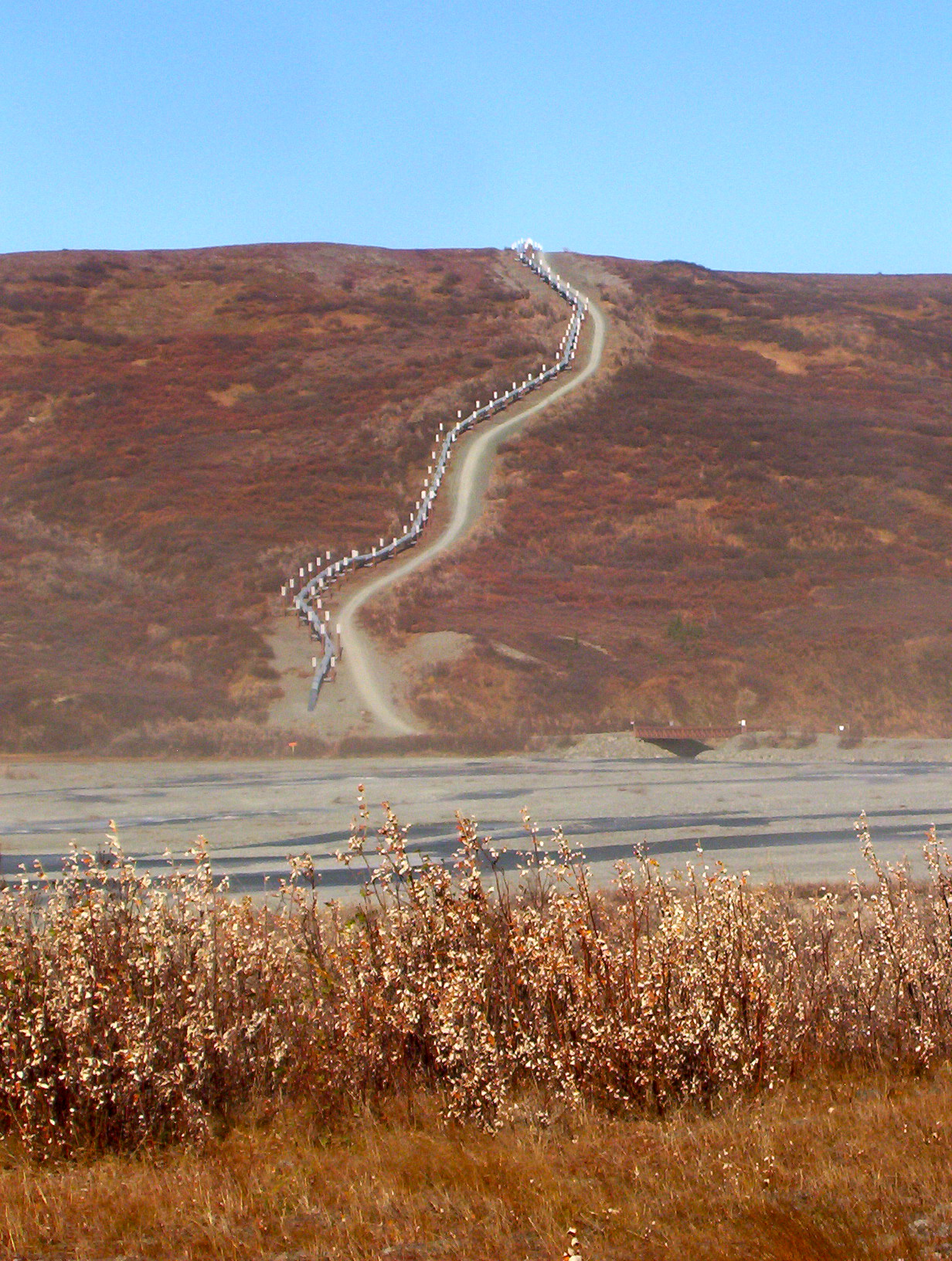
The Trans-Alaska Pipeline seen from across the Delta River

The Valdez-Eagle Trail was laid down through the Delta valley during the first decade of the 1900s, as part of a project to connect Valdez on the southern coast with Eagle on the upper Yukon. In 1904, the U.S. Army established a telegraph station along the road at the mouth of the Delta River; this station grew into the community of Big Delta, Alaska. In 1919, Delta Junction was established to the south of Big Delta as a construction camp for the Richardson Highway, running along the river valley.

In the 1950s, agricultural developments begun around Delta Junction. A state agricultural plan in the late 1970s and 1980s cleared more than 110 square miles (280 km^{2}) of land in the surrounding area for cultivation. However, most of the Delta River area remains undeveloped wilderness.

=== Land use and management ===
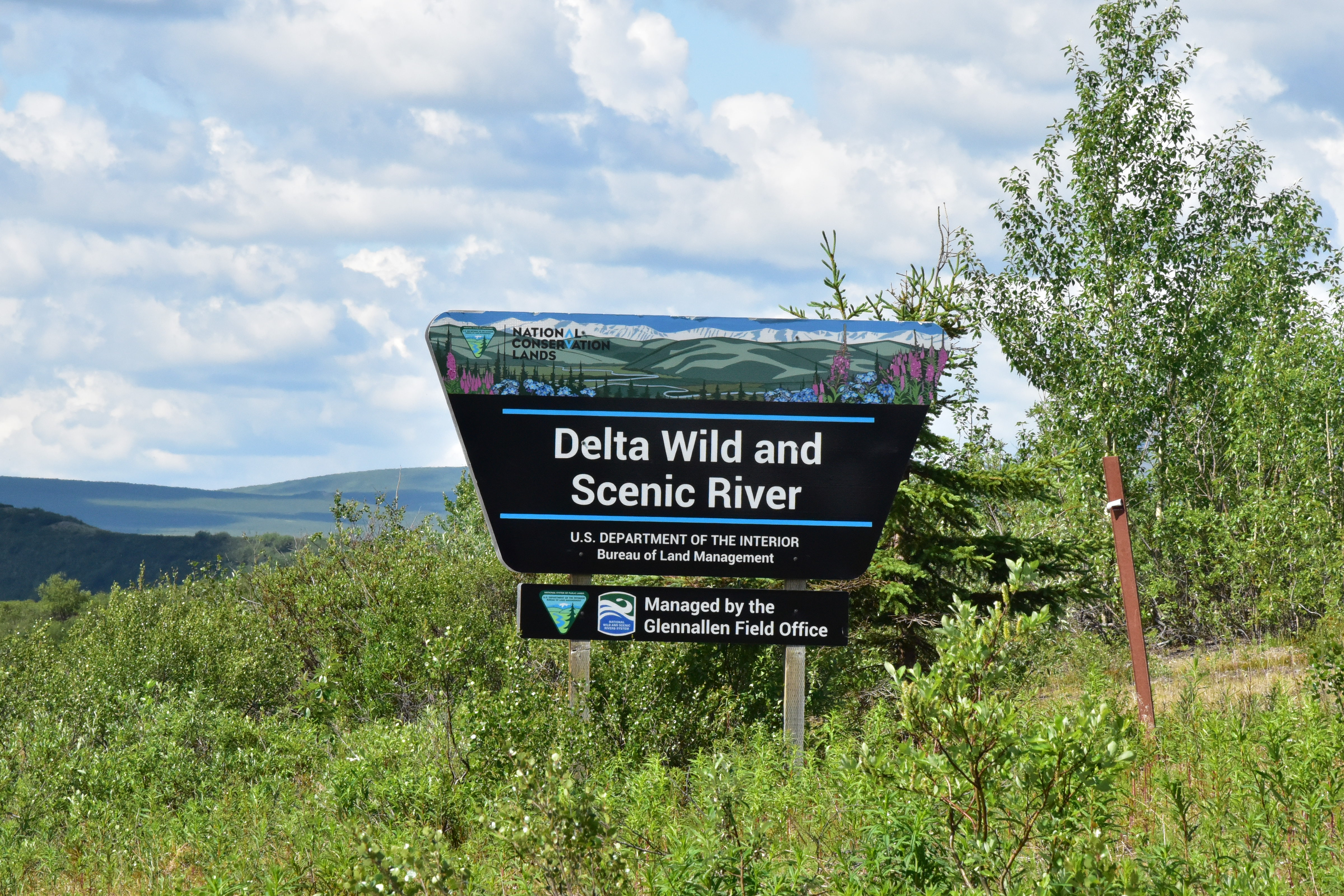
A Bureau of Land Management sign marking the Delta Wild and Scenic River

In December 1980, the Alaska National Interest Lands Conservation Act designated a portion of the Delta River as the Delta Wild and Scenic River Corridor, part of the National Wild and Scenic Rivers System. This designation included the upper portions of the river's course, as well as the Tangle Lakes and their tributary, the Tangle River. Described by the managing Bureau of Land Management (BLM) as "one of the few easily accessible wild and scenic rivers in Alaska", the basin is used for recreational activities such as wildlife watching, fishing, hunting, trapping, camping, and skiing. Recreational boating is also popular along the river and the Tangle Lakes.

The Richardson Highway runs along the corridor, meeting the Alaska Highway at Delta Junction. In addition to the corridor, the BLM administers the area south of the Denali Highway, which runs across the river, as well as large portions of the region west of the Richardson Highway. Beyond this, much of the land is administered by the Alaska Department of Natural Resources. A portion of the Trans-Alaska Pipeline System runs through the valley, mostly parallel to the Richardson Highway. The U.S. military base Fort Greely and the associated Donnelly Training Area cover about 710,347 acres (2,875 km^{2}) of territory to the south and west of Delta Junction.

A BLM campground and limited commercial facilities are located along the Richardson Highway. It is frequently used by backcountry campers, fishers, and hunters. Although suitable campsites are common around the Tangle Lakes, they become very scarce along the upper Delta River itself, resulting in a lack of firewood, frequent fire rings, and trampled vegetation. Campsites become more common in the lower portions of the river, resulting in less environmental damage.
