= Pioneer Creek =

Coordinates: 65.1778°N 150.2069°W

Pioneer Creek is a tributary of Baker Creek in the U.S. state of Alaska. Other Baker tributaries in the vicinity include Eureka, Thanksgiving, and Gold Run.

== Geography ==
Pioneer Creek heads against the Baker-Minook divide, flows around the head of the Eureka, and then, at a distance of 1–2 miles (1.6–3.2 km), flows parallel to the main course of that creek. After traversing 7–8 miles (11–13 km), it joins Eureka Creek and they are said to lose themselves on Baker Flats. Pioneer Creek never carries less than three or four sluice-heads of water, and its gradient along its lower course is about 60 feet (18 m) per mile. The valley's northwest side has a gentle slope running back for about a mile, and the southeast side is of almost precipitous steepness. On the gentle slope of the northwest side there are perceptibly flatter places or benches, but only one of these is persistent. This bench is traceable along Pioneer Creek for over 4 miles (6.4 km). Its northeast end is a little above the present level of the creek while its southwest end is about 250 feet (76 m) above the creek. Over this bench and covering much of the slope below is a deposit of auriferous gravel left by the creek as it moved to the southeast. The different diggings upon it are known as "bars". Five small tributaries, Doric, Boothby, Seattle Junior, Skookum, and Joe Bush, flow across this bench at right angles to the course of Pioneer Creek. Near the upper end of the bench at Joe Bush Creek, prospecting holes showed a well-defined old stream channel.

== Geology ==
The bed rock is schistose grit with interbedded slates and thin beds of quartzite. The grits sometimes become very carbonaceous, particularly on Doric Creek. There is some quartz in small veins and stringers, and on Doric Creek at places there is considerable pyrite distributed through the rocks. The pyrite is often oxidized, so that only small holes lined with iron rust indicate its former presence. On Doric Creek, inclusions of a carbonaceous substance the size of a walnut occur with small quartz seams.

== History ==
Like many other Alaskan' creeks Pioneer Creek was staked in the early 20th century, and then each man waited for his neighbor to do the hard work necessary to locate the pay streak, if there \was one. Meanwhile, the claims lapsed and were then restaked by other parties, and pay was discovered on What Cheer Bar in 1902. After this discovery pay was found on Doric Creek and at several other points along the bench. The production of Pioneer Creek Valley to the end of the summer of 1904 was about $35,800.
