= Rampart, Alaska =

Rampart Dleł Taaneets
- CDP
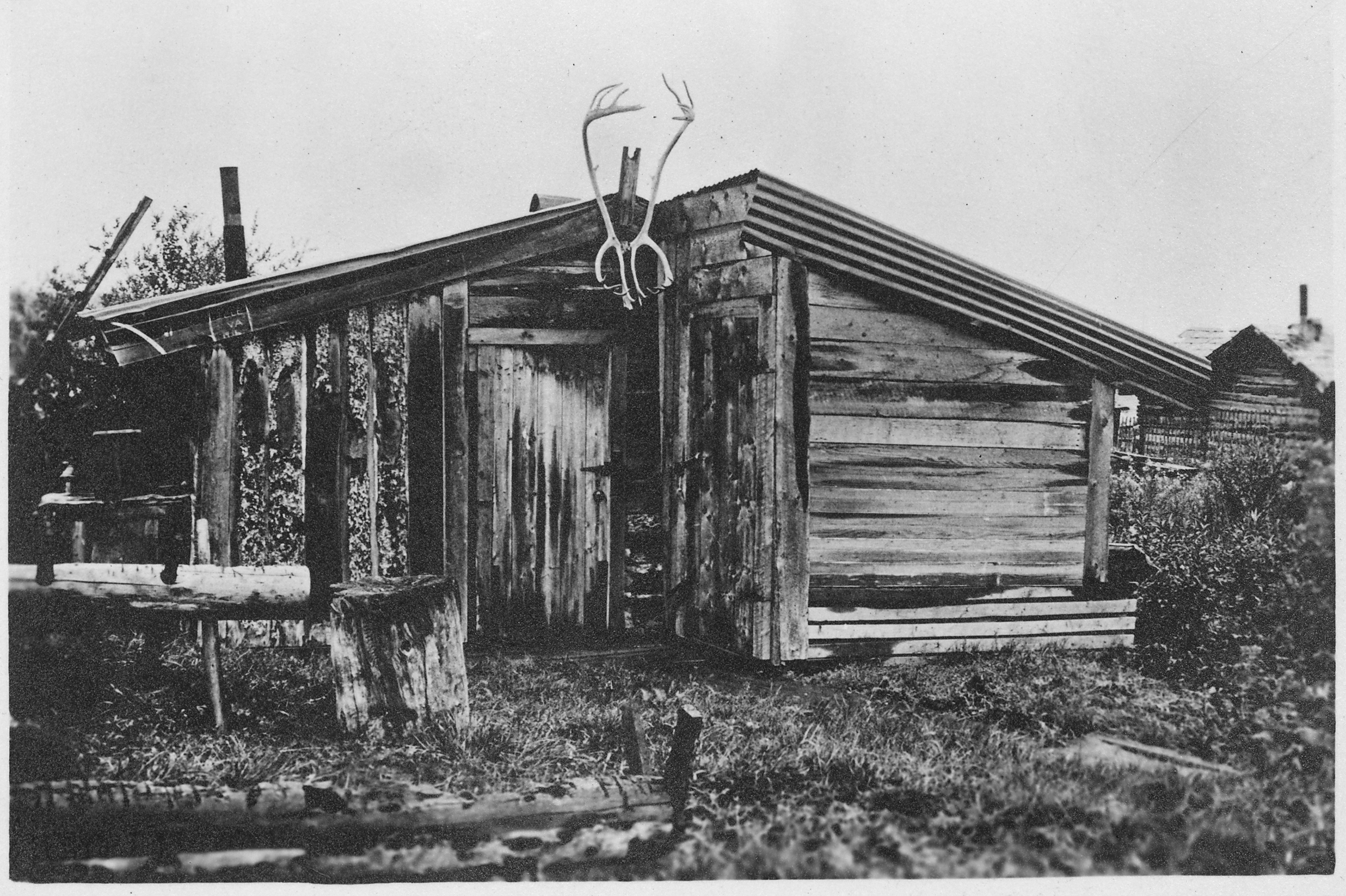
- Cabin in Rampart, owned by novelist Rex Beach.

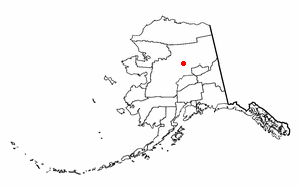
- Location of Rampart, Alaska
- Coordinates: 65°30′26″N 150°8′55″W
- Country: United States
- State: Alaska
- Census Area: Yukon-Koyukuk

Government
  - State senator: Click Bishop (R)
  - State rep.: Mike Cronk (R)

Area
  - Total: 169.90 sq mi (440.04 km^{2})
  - Land: 169.83 sq mi (439.85 km^{2})
  - Water: 0.077 sq mi (0.20 km^{2})

Population (2020)
  - Total: 57
  - Density: 0.34/sq mi (0.13/km^{2})
- Time zone: UTC-9 (Alaska (AKST))
  - Summer (DST): UTC-8 (AKDT)
- ZIP code: 99767
- Area code: 907
- FIPS code: 02-64820

Rampart (Koyukon: Dleł Taaneets [t͡ɬəɬ tʰæːniːt͡sʰ]) is a census-designated place (CDP) in Yukon-Koyukuk Census Area, Alaska, United States. As of the 2020 census, Rampart had a population of 57.

== History ==
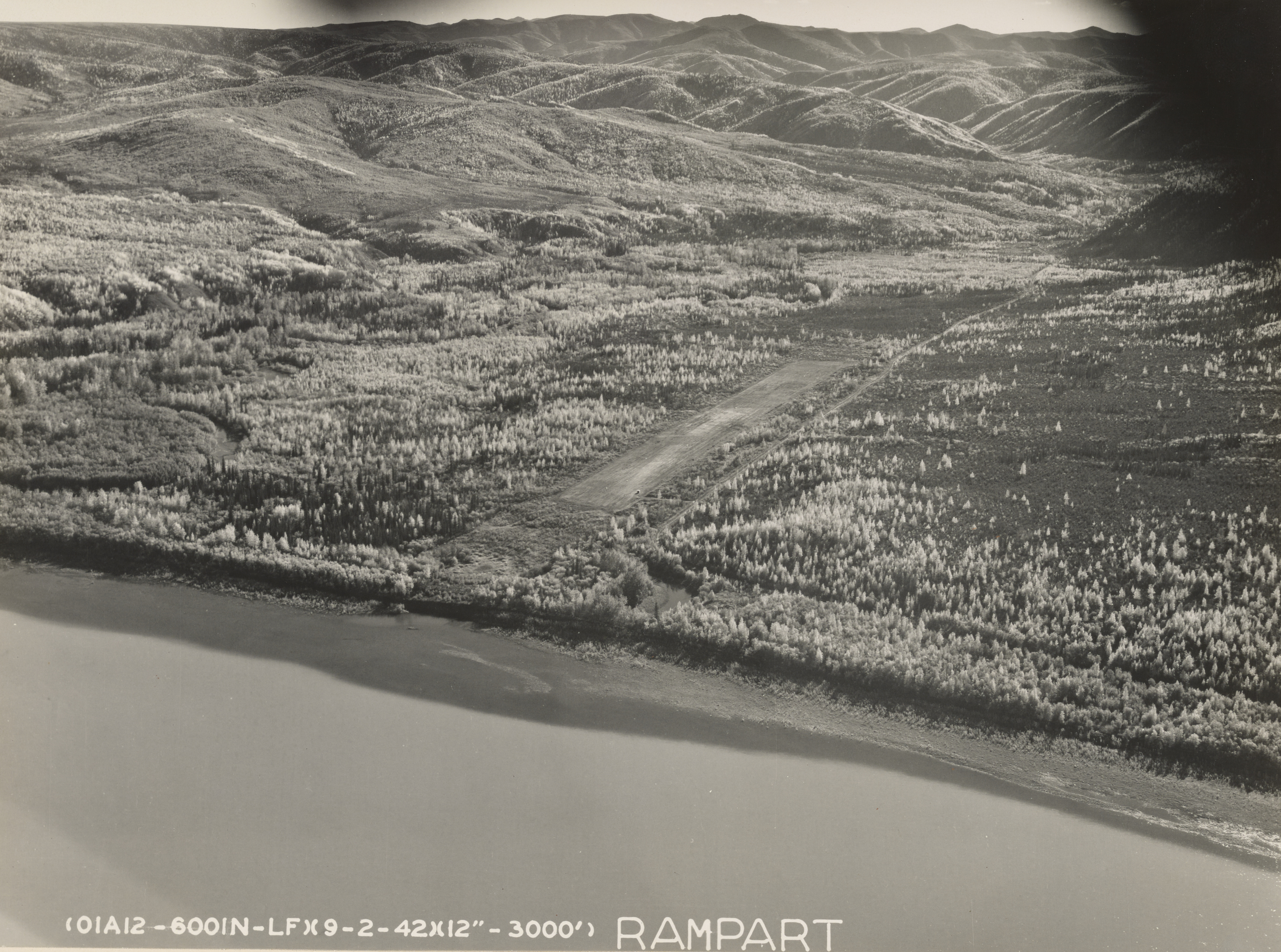
Airstrip at Rampart, 1942

Novelist Rex Beach (1877-1949) moved to Rampart in 1900, during the Klondike Gold Rush (1896-1899); although his prospecting efforts were of little success, the experience led to the publication of The Spoilers, one of three novels written by Beach that made it to Publishers Weekly list of bestselling novels in the United States in the 1900s. Film adaptations of The Spoilers were released in 1914, 1923, 1930, 1942, and 1955.

In the 1950s, a large hydroelectric project called the Rampart Dam was considered for the Yukon River near the village. Had the project been completed, it would have created the largest man-made reservoir in the world. Owing to popular protest, however, the project was never begun.

== Geography ==
Rampart is located at 65°30′26″N 150°8′55″W (65.507350, -150.148496). According to the United States Census Bureau, the CDP has a total area of 168.8 square miles (437 km^{2}), all of it land. Minook Creek is just east of Rampart. Baker Creek is to the south.

== Demographics ==
Historical population
Census	Pop.	Note	%±
1880	110		—
1900	211		—
1910	119		−43.6%
1920	121		1.7%
1930	103		−14.9%
1940	106		2.9%
1950	94		−11.3%
1960	49		−47.9%
1970	36		−26.5%
1980	50		38.9%
1990	68		36.0%
2000	45		−33.8%
2010	24		−46.7%
2020	57		137.5%
U.S. Decennial Census

Rampart first appeared on the 1880 U.S. Census as an unincorporated Tinneh village. It did not appear in 1890, but returned in 1900 following its becoming a mining boom rush town. In 1910, the census divided the unincorporated village into two separate returns: the majority White residents of Rampart (with 83) and the "Native Village" portion of Rampart (with 36). It is listed here as combined for a total of 119. From 1920 onwards, census enumerators returned it as one community again. In 1980, it was made a census-designated place (CDP).

As of the census of 2000, there were 45 people, 20 households, and 10 families residing in the CDP. The population density was 0.3 inhabitants per square mile (0.12/km^{2}). There were 46 housing units at an average density of 0.3 per square mile (0.12/km^{2}). The racial makeup of the CDP was 88.89% Native American, 6.67% White, 2.22% from other races, and 2.22% from two or more races.

There were 20 households, out of which 40.0% had children under the age of 18 living with them, 30.0% were married couples living together, 20.0% had a female householder with no husband present, and 50.0% were non-families. 35.0% of all households were made up of individuals, and 15.0% had someone living alone who was 65 years of age or older. The average household size was 2.25 and the average family size was 2.90.

In the CDP, the age distribution of the population shows 28.9% under the age of 18, 4.4% from 18 to 24, 37.8% from 25 to 44, 20.0% from 45 to 64, and 8.9% who were 65 years of age or older. The median age was 34 years. For every 100 females, there were 114.3 males. For every 100 females age 18 and over, there were 113.3 males.

The median income for a household in the CDP was $22,813, and the median income for a family was $23,438. Males had a median income of $53,750 versus $21,250 for females. The per capita income for the CDP was $12,438. There were 18.2% of families and 17.9% of the population living below the poverty line, including 18.2% of under eighteens and none of those over 64.

== Notable people ==
- Wyatt Earp, lawman, gambler, prospector
- Josephine Earp, common law wife of Wyatt Earp
- Rex Beach, novelist
- Mary Jane Fate, Native American activist
- Georgianna Lincoln, Alaska state Representative, Senator and Democratic party Congressional nominee
- Henry Roden, prospector, lawyer, Alaska state Representative, Attorney General of the Territory of Alaska
