= Denali Highway =

Highway in Alaska, USA

Denali Highway
- Denali Highway highlighted in red

Route information
- Maintained by Alaska DOT&PF
- Length: 135 mi (217 km)
- Existed: c. 1953–present

Major junctions
- West end: AK-3 (George Parks Highway) in Cantwell
- Old Parks Highway in Cantwell
- East end: AK-4 (Richardson Highway) in Paxson

Location
- Country: United States
- State: Alaska
- Boroughs: Denali, Matanuska-Susitna, Copper River

Highway system
- Alaska Routes; Interstate; Scenic Byways
← AK-7	→ AK-9

Denali Highway (Alaska Route 8) is a lightly traveled, mostly gravel highway in the U.S. state of Alaska. It leads from Paxson on the Richardson Highway to Cantwell on the Parks Highway. Opened in 1957, it was the first road access to Denali National Park. Since 1971, primary park access has been via the Parks Highway, which incorporated a section of the Denali Highway from Cantwell to the present-day park entrance. The Denali Highway is 135 miles (217 km) in length.

== History ==
Following the construction of the Alaska Railroad in 1923, Alaska residents pushed for road access to Denali National Park in the early 1930s. Around the same time, a dirt road was being built between Cantwell to supply the mining settlement at Valdez Creek known then as Denali. Little else was achieved before the onset of World War II.

After the end of the war, the Alaska Road Commission recommended construction of a "Paxson-McKinley Park Road," which began surveys for the project in 1947. Construction began in early 1950, and the road was commissioned on August 5, 1957. However, a private vehicle snuck through and drove the length of the highway three days prior.

== Conditions ==
The highway is now little used and poorly maintained, and closed to all traffic from October to mid-May each year. Only the easternmost 21.3 miles (34.3 km) and westernmost 2.6 miles (4.2 km) are paved; whether the remainder should be paved as well is a continual source of debate. Washboarding and extreme dust are common, and the recommended speed limit is 30 mph (48 km/h).

== Route description ==
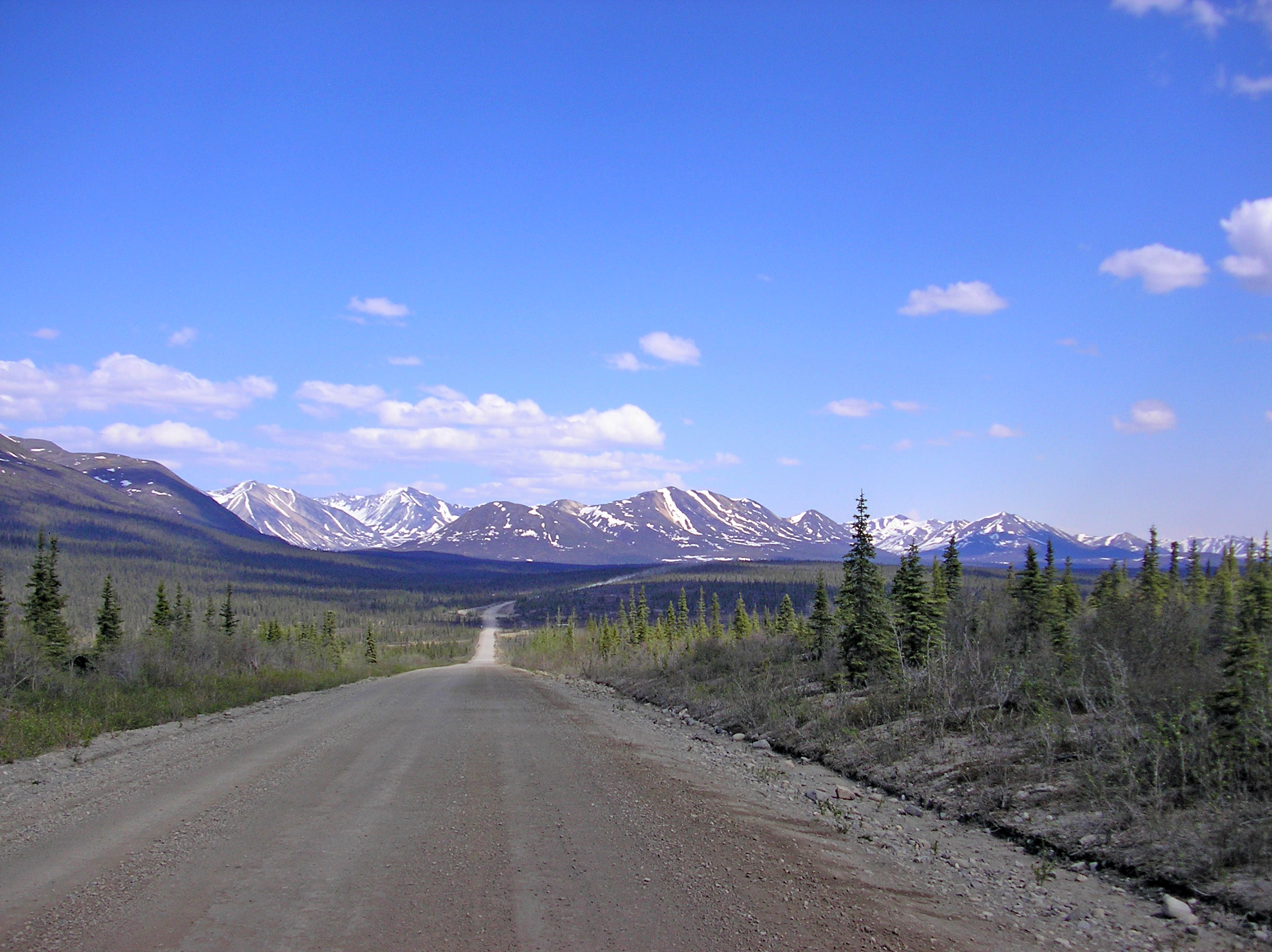
The Denali Highway as seen in summer

Traveling west, the Denali Highway leaves the Richardson Highway (Alaska Route 4) at Paxson, and climbs steeply up into the foothills of the central Alaska Range. The first 21 miles (34 km), to Tangle Lakes, are paved. Along its length, the highway passes through three of the principal river drainages in Interior Alaska: the Copper River drainage, the Tanana/Yukon drainage and the Susitna drainage. Along the way, in good weather, there are views of the peaks and glaciers of the central Alaska Range, including Mount Hayes (13,700 ft), Mount Hess (11,940 ft) and Mount Deborah (12,688 ft). At MP 15, from the pullout on the south side of the road, in clear weather it is possible to see the Wrangell Mountains, the Chugach Mountains and the Alaska Range.

The first 45 miles (72 km) winds through the Amphitheater Mountains, cresting at Maclaren Summit, at 4,086 feet (1,245 m) the second highest road in Alaska. The road then drops down to the Maclaren River Valley with fine views north to Maclaren Glacier. After crossing the Maclaren River, the road winds through the geologically mysterious Crazy Notch and then along the toe of the Denali Clearwater Mountains to the Susitna River. After crossing the Susitna River the road extends across the glacier's outwash plains to the Nenana River, and then down the Nenana River to Cantwell on the George Parks Highway (Alaska Route 3).

== Services ==
There are developed campgrounds at Tangle Lakes (MP 22) and Brushkana Creek (MP 104), but there are dozens of pullouts where one can camp on public lands.

Services are scant along this road.

Year-round operations include Denali Highway Cabins & Tours (MP 0.2), Maclaren River Lodge (MP 42), Alpine Creek Lodge (MP68), Backwoods Lodge (MP134) and Cantwell Lodge (MP138); summer-only operations include Tangle Lakes Lodge (MP 22), Tangle River Inn (MP 20), Clearwater Mountain Lodge (MP 82). Winter travel on the Denali Highway is exclusively by snowmobile and dogsled. Automobile travelers are severely discouraged from attempting to traverse the road in winter; as recently as 1996 three persons died from exposure when snows blocked their progress. The road is cleared by DOT late in April and generally is passable by non-4WD from then until the first snows close it, usually late September on the eastern, tundra end and late October-early November on the lower, boreal forest western end.

== Recreation ==
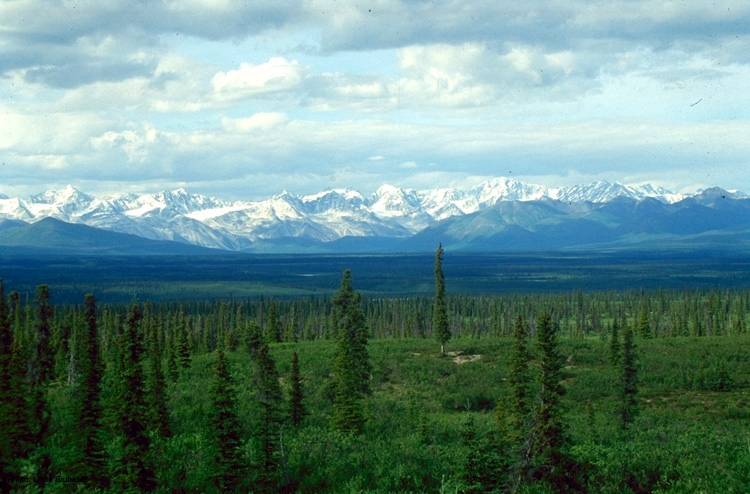
White Spruce taiga along the Denali Highway, with the Alaska Mountain Range in the Background

The Tangle Lakes constitute the headwaters of the Delta River, a popular destination for canoeists as it is the launch point of the Delta River Canoe Trail.

The Denali Highway is an important birding destination. It offers road access to alpine terrain – not that common in Alaska – and, in the brief birding season there, good viewing of a number of alpine breeders, including Arctic Warbler, Smith's Longspur, Long-tailed Jaeger, Whimbrel, Surfbird, Lapland Longspur, Horned Lark, Short-eared Owl, Wandering Tattler, Gyrfalcon and much more. A walk north along The Bureau of Land Management's (BLM) Maclaren Summit Trail (MP 39) can be very productive. There are also trumpeter swans and various other waterfowl in the lakes and ponds along the route.

Fishing for grayling and lake trout is possible in any of the clear and unglaciated streams.

Because the area is hunted heavily, larger mammals are much less common than in Denali National Park, but moose, grizzly bear, and caribou are fairly common. The Nelchina caribou herd, approximately 36,000 animals as of winter 2009–2010, normally passes through this area after calving season ends, and some autumns and winters as many as 16,000 animals can be seen at once. The herd forms an important food source for many residents of southcentral Alaska, and visitors eager to view the animals may be competing with hunters. The many lakes along the road are also a destination for duck hunting in the fall.

Most of the land along the highway is publicly owned. There are several BLM-maintained trails, and dozens of informal trails. This is a stretch of wild Alaska that is pretty much unspoiled, relatively accessible and scenic.

== Major intersections ==
Borough	Location	mi	km	Destinations	Notes
Denali	Cantwell	0.0	0.0	AK-3 (George Parks Highway)	Western end of state maintenance; highway continues west to Cantwell Airport via dirt road
Denali	Cantwell	0.4	0.64	Old Parks Highway	Access to Alaska DOT&PF Cantwell Station
Unorganized	Paxson	134	216	Paxson Airport Access Road	Access to Paxson Airport
Unorganized	Paxson	135	217	AK-4 (Richardson Highway)	Eastern terminus
1.000 mi = 1.609 km; 1.000 km = 0.621 mi

== Gallery ==
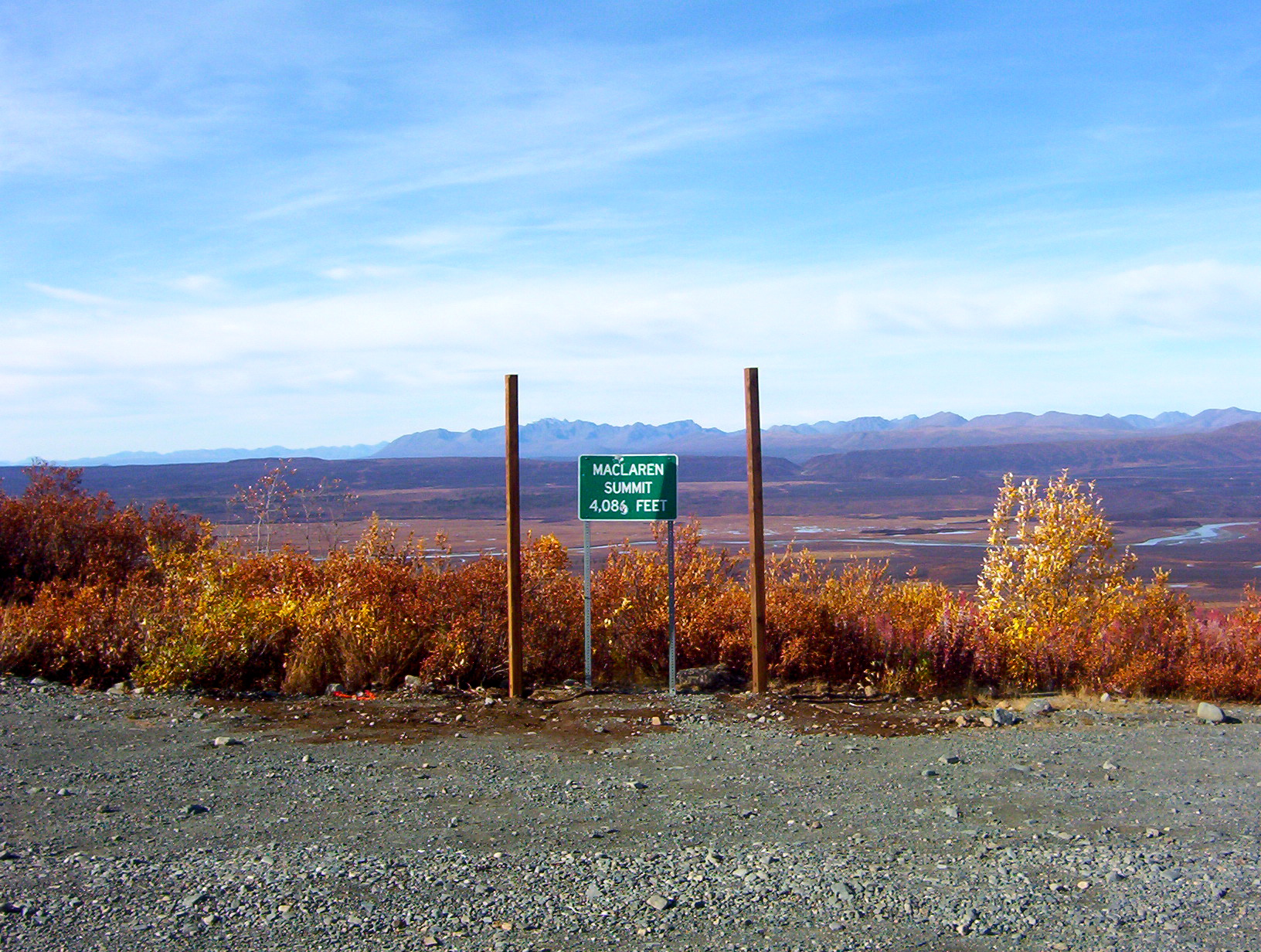
At 4,086 feet (1,245 m), Maclaren Summit is the highest point on the highway.

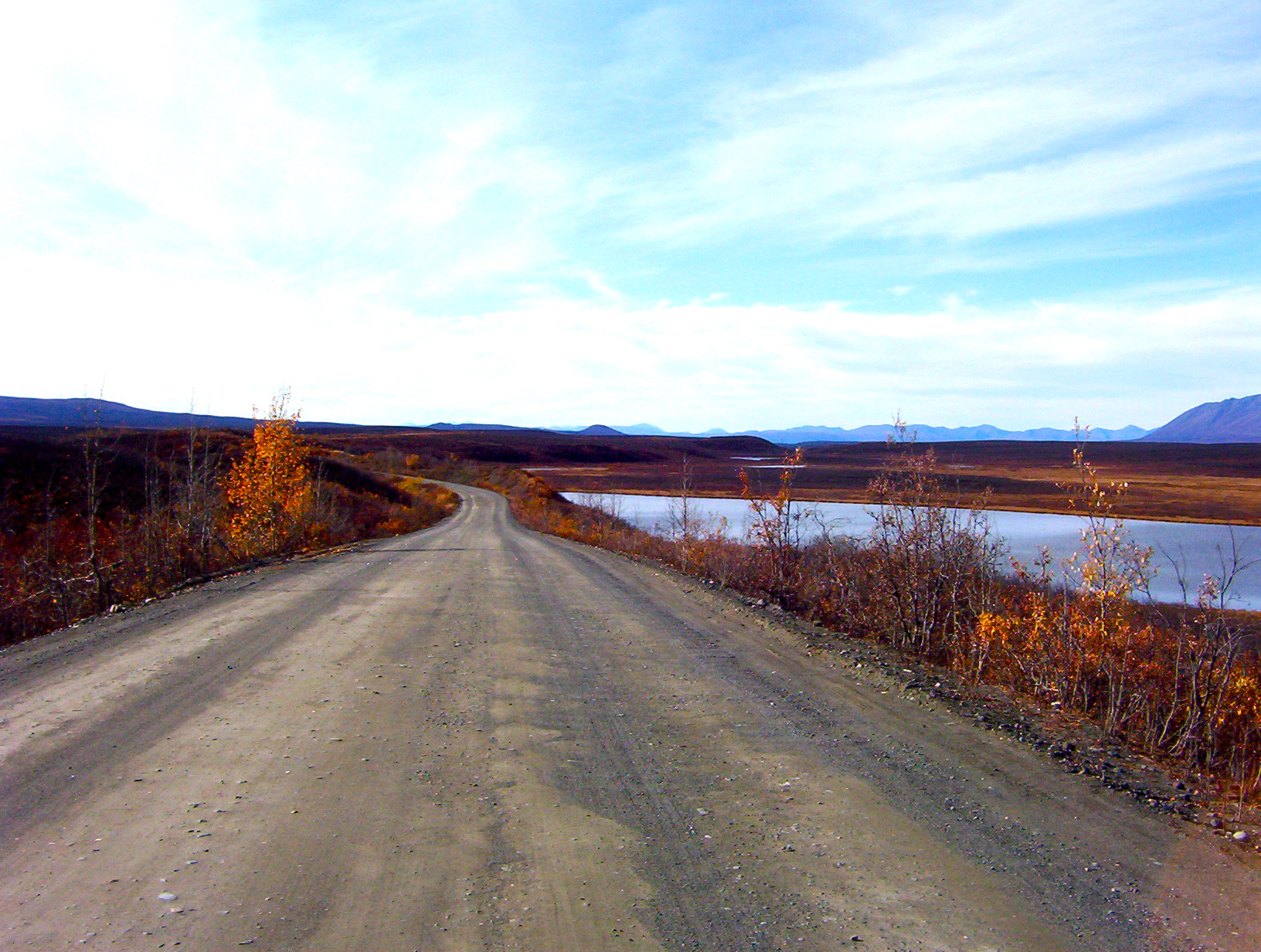
Portions of the road are built directly on top of glacial eskers.

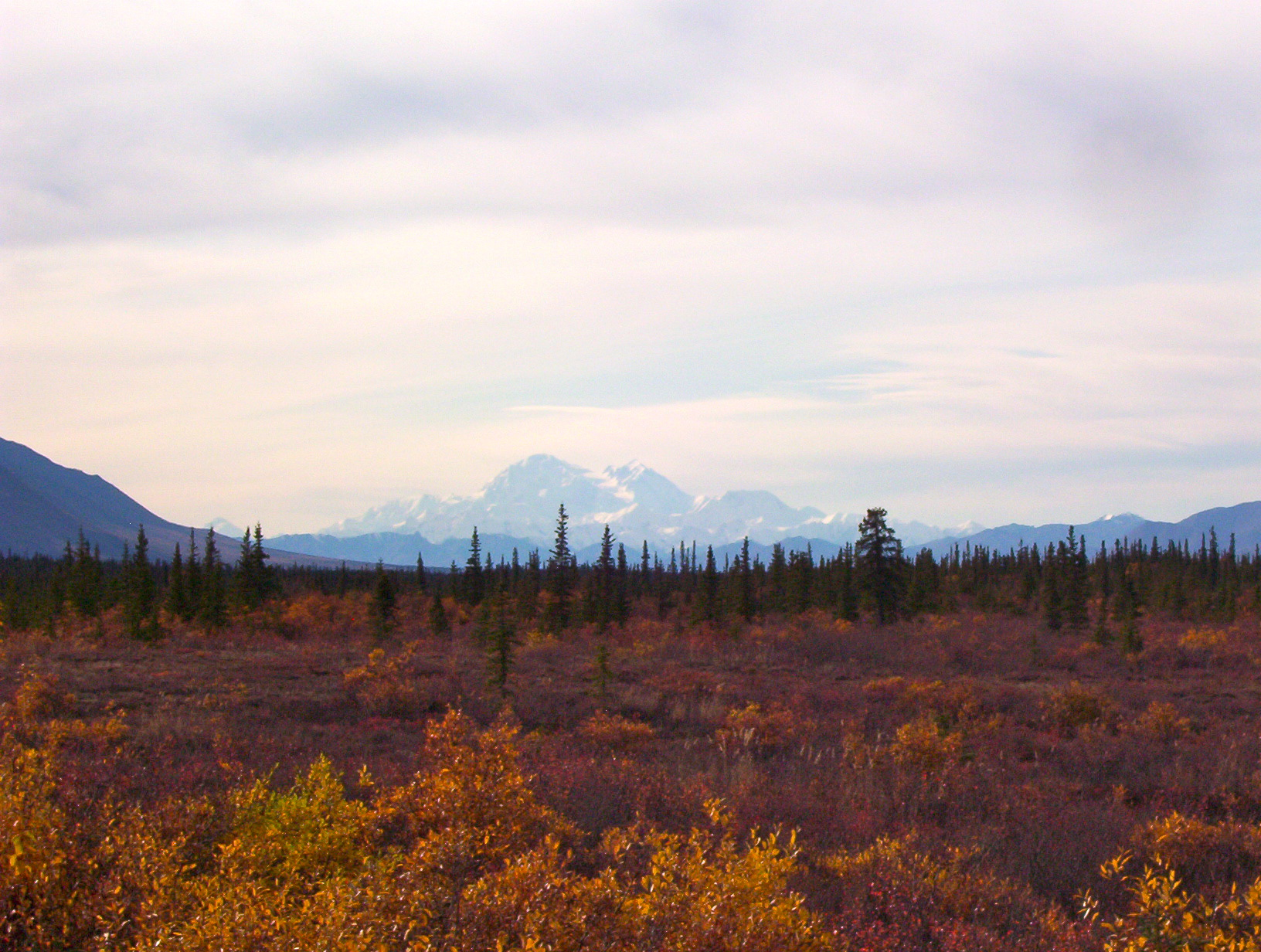
On a clear day, westbound travelers can see Denali

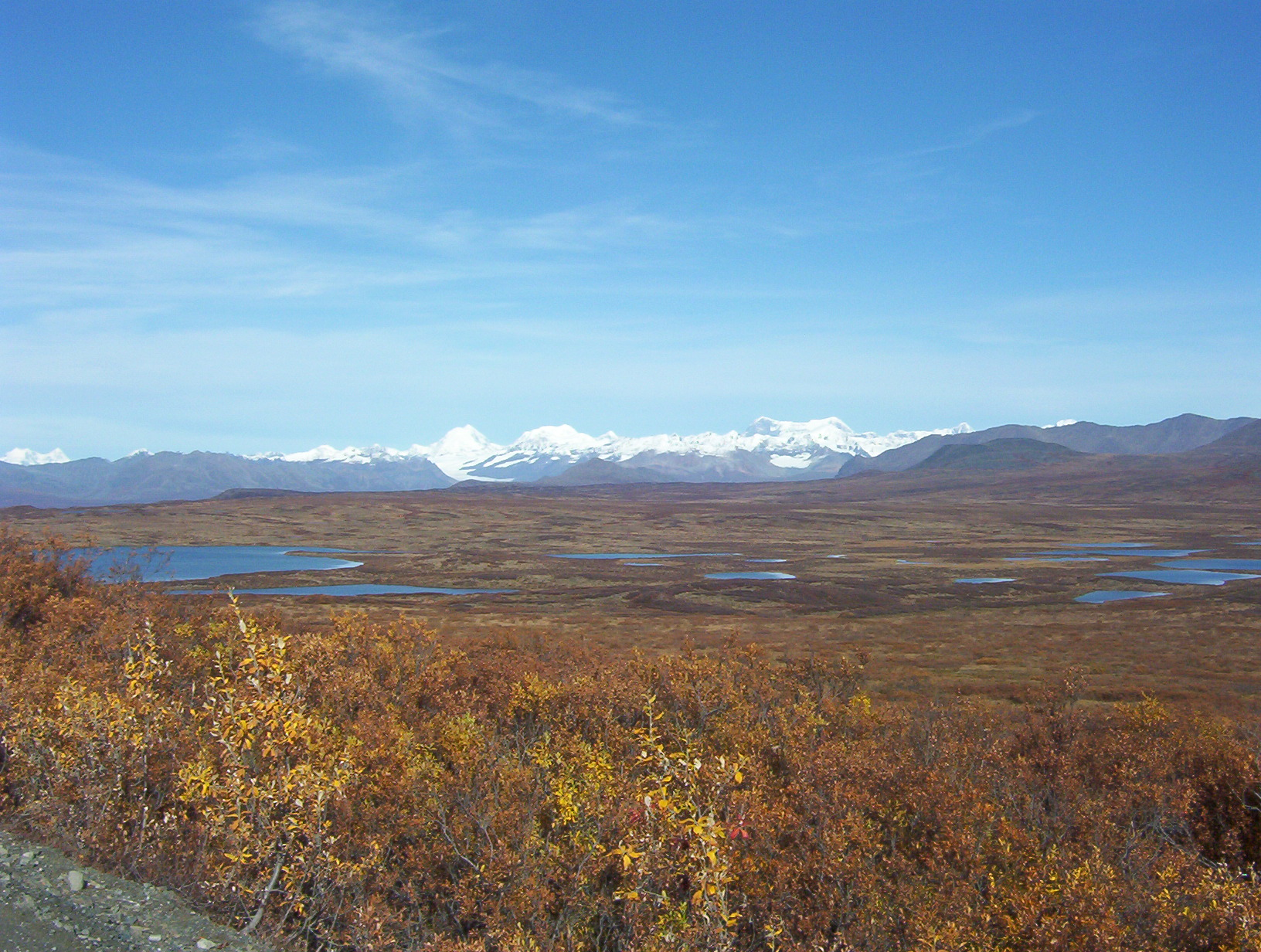
Numerous kettle lakes line the eastern portion of the highway.

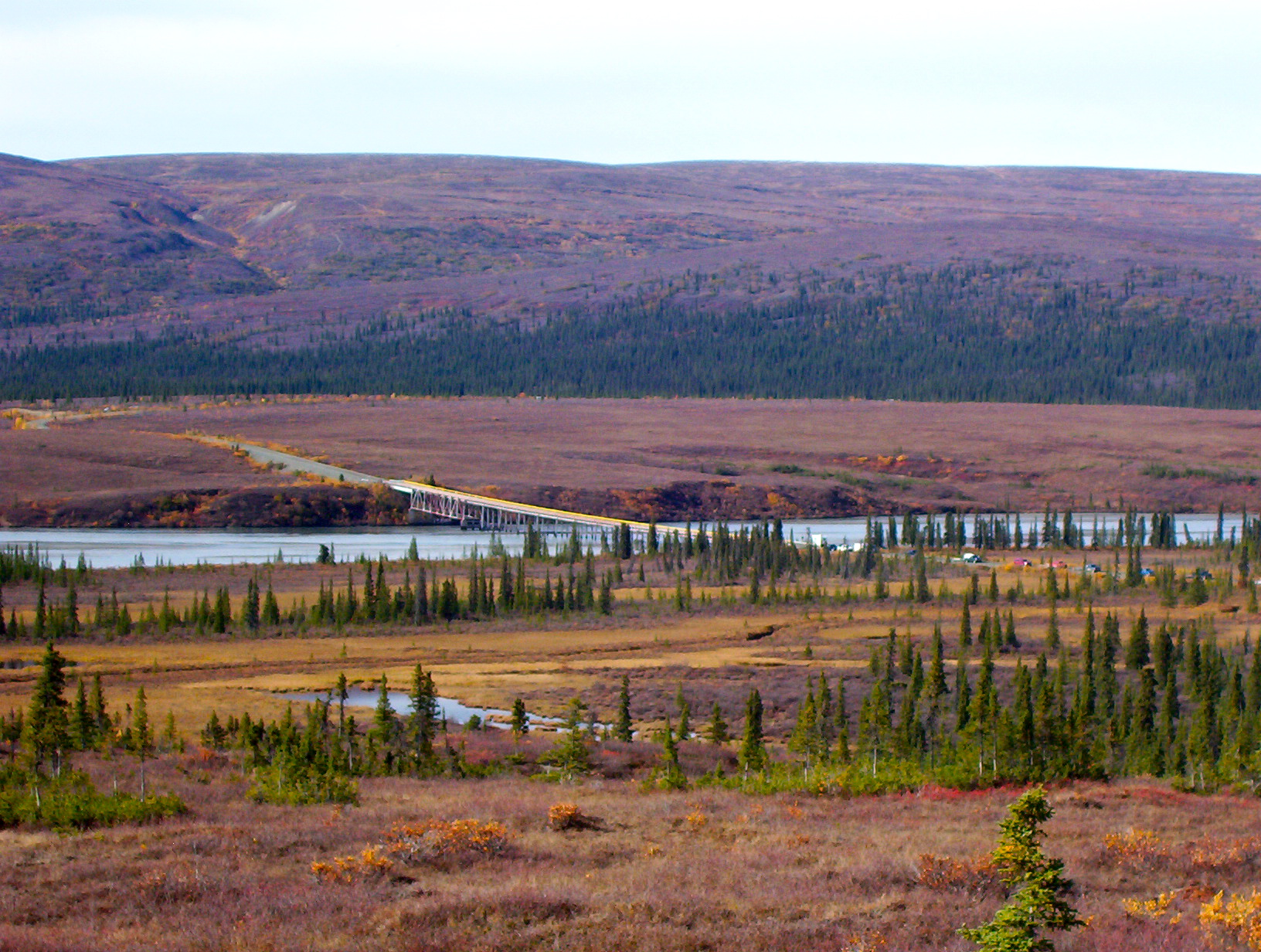
The Susitna River crossing is the only large bridge on the highway.

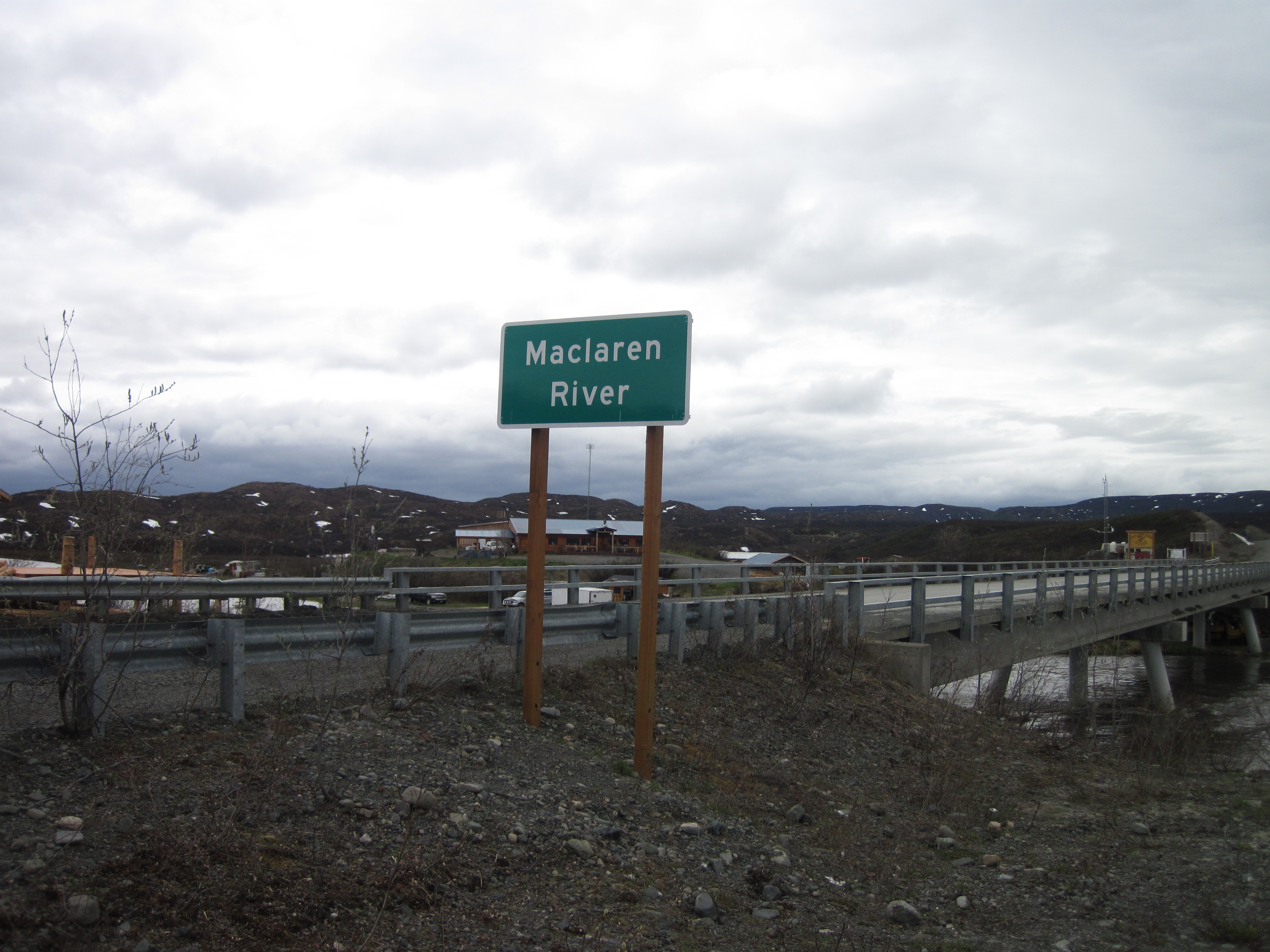
The Denali Highway crossing the Maclaren River

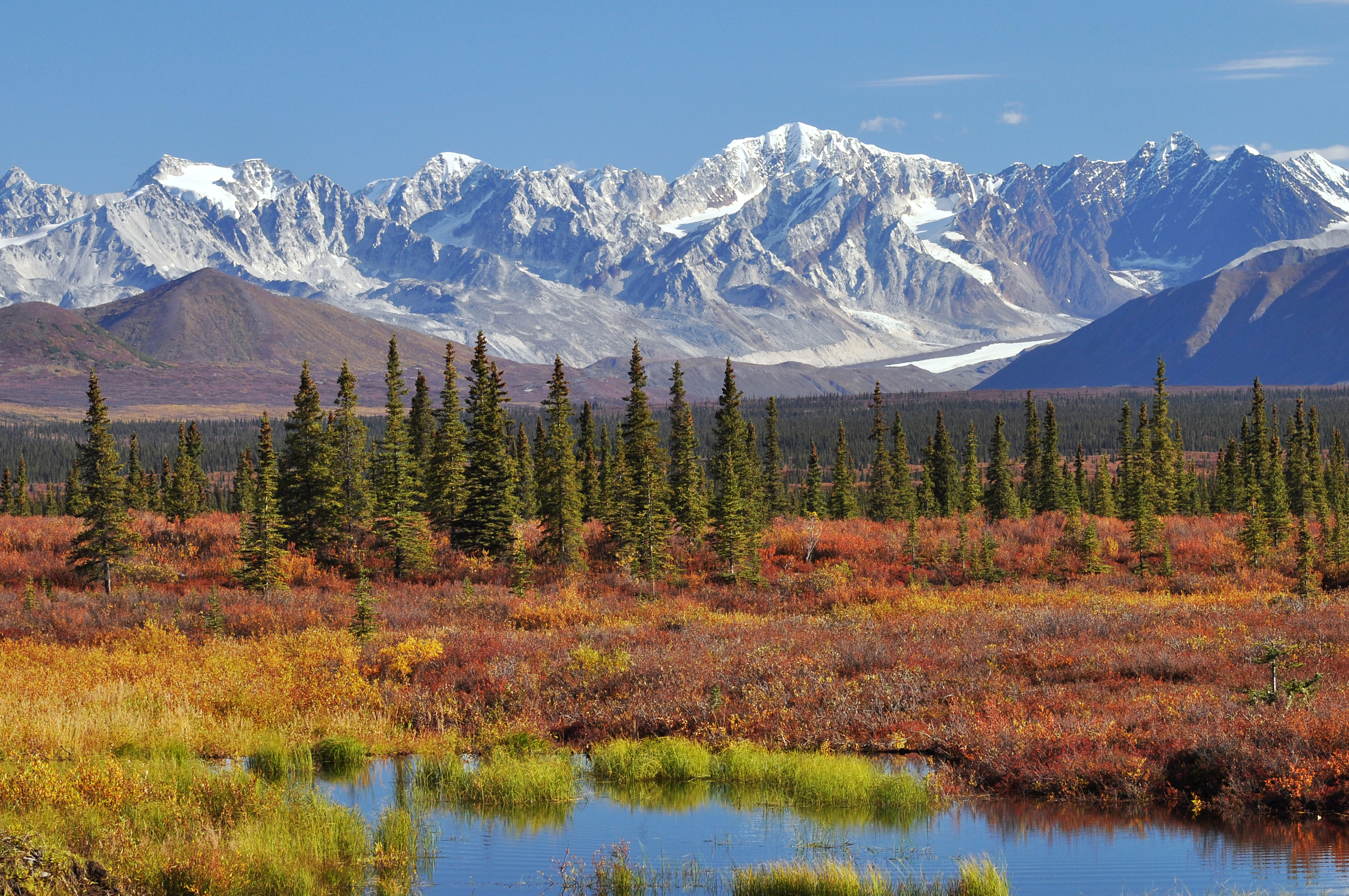
Monahan Flat and the eastern Alaska Range, as seen from the Denali Highway
