= Tangle Lakes =

Lakes in Alaska

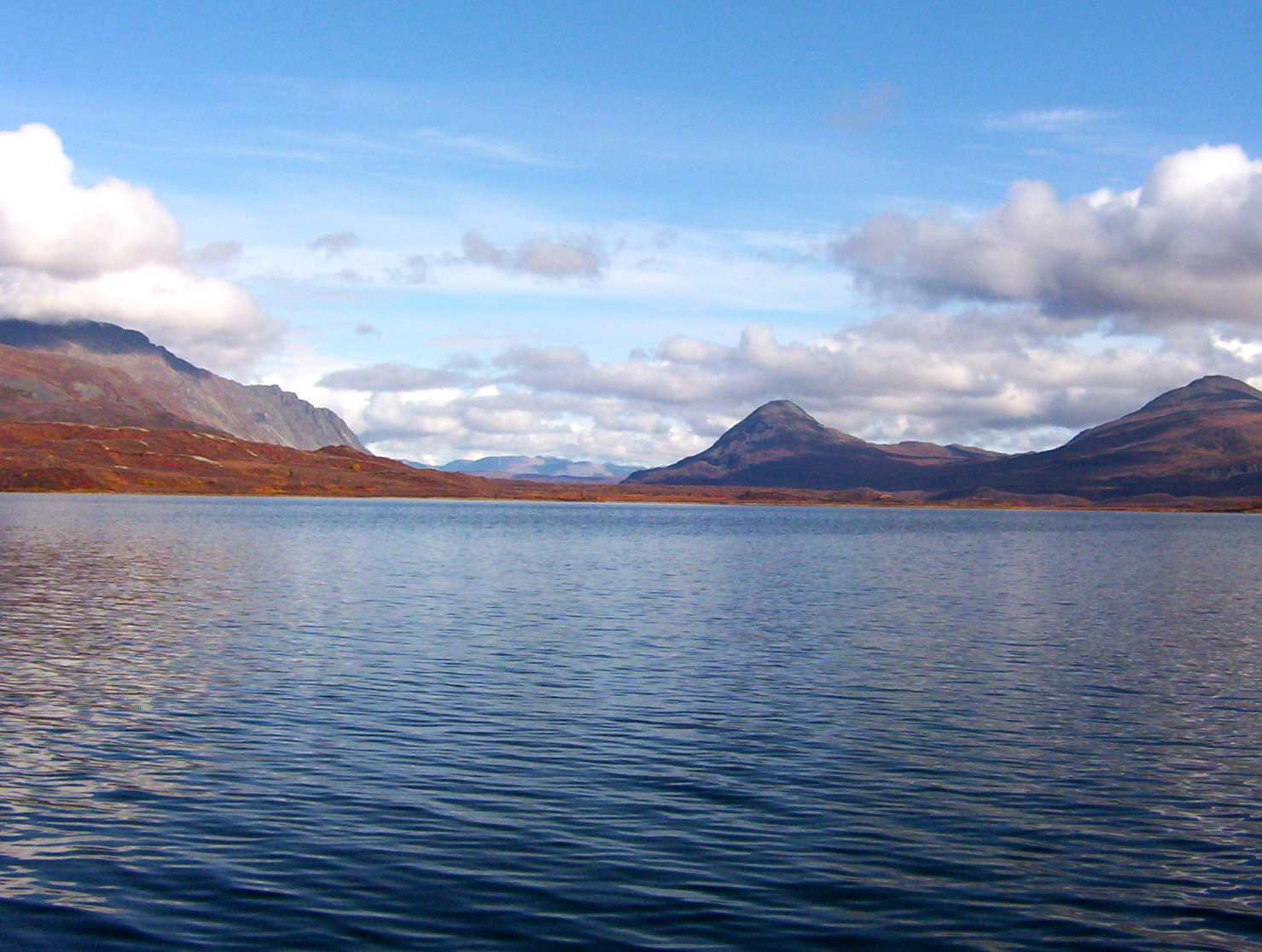
- Round Tangle Lake with nearby peaks of the Alaska Range

- Location within Alaska
- Location: Alaska
- Coordinates: 63°01′40″N 146°03′41″W

The Tangle Lakes (Long Tangle Lake, Lower Tangle Lake, Round Tangle Lake, and Upper Tangle Lake) are a 16-mile (26 km) long chain of lakes connected by streams in interior Alaska. They form the headwaters for the Delta River.

== Access and use ==
The main public access to the Lakes is from a Bureau of Land Management maintained campground and boat launch at Round Tangle Lake, about 20 miles (32 km) from Paxson on the Denali Highway. The boat launch is also the upper terminus of the Delta River Canoe Trail, a 2-3 day route to the Gulkana River and the Richardson Highway. The lakes support many species of fish, including lake trout, burbot, and Arctic grayling. The area around the lakes consists mostly of tundra due to the high elevation (2,864 feet (873 m)).

== History ==
- Tangle Lakes Archeological District
- U.S. National Register of Historic Places
- U.S. Historic district
- Alaska Heritage Resources Survey
- Location: Address restricted
- Nearest city: Paxson
- NRHP reference No.: 71001091
- AHRS No.: XMH-201
- Added to NRHP: November 12, 1971

The Tangle Lakes area has been the subject of extensive archaeological exploration. Prior to 1976, almost 150 sites had been discovered showing that The Tangle Lakes have been populated intermittently since the settlement of the New World. The sites are concentrated close to the lakes in a range covering about 80 square kilometres and the attraction of the location was most likely that the windswept hills surrounding the lakes would have attracted caribou seeking to graze on the exposed lichen (not for fishing as the lakes would not have been able to support a settlement). Part of the Tangle Lakes area has been listed on the National Register of Historic Places as an archaeological district in 1971.

== See also ==
- National Register of Historic Places listings in Copper River Census Area, Alaska
- National Register of Historic Places listings in Matanuska-Susitna Borough, Alaska
