= Eureka Creek =

Coordinates: 65.0922°N 150.2847°W

Eureka Creek is a tributary of Baker Creek in the U.S. state of Alaska. Other Baker tributaries in the vicinity of Eureka Creek include Thanksgiving, Gold Run, and Pioneer creeks with Seattle Junior Creek a tributary of Pioneer.

== Geography ==
Eureka Creek flows southwest along the foot of the Baker-Minook divide. It runs in a straight southwest course for about 4.5 miles (7.2 km), then turns and runs south 2.5 miles (4.0 km) to its junction with Pioneer Creek. It has a number of small tributaries from the northwest side, but none from the southeast. The largest is Boston Creek, about 2 miles (3.2 km) long, which joins Eureka Creek at its bend. The other tributaries are rills. Eureka is a small creek carrying barely a sluicehead of water above the mouth of Boston Creek during the ordinary seasons. The valley slopes gently to the divide on the northwest side, but on the southeast side the slope is almost precipitous, rising 400–600 feet (120–180 m) above the valley. The creek flows close to the foot of the steeper side.

The gravels of the creek are not very worn, characteristic of weak streams, and have been left for a considerable distance, in places at least 500 feet (150 m), up the slope of the hill as the stream bed has moved to the southeast. The bench gravels are made up entirely of country rocks. The deposit varies in thickness from 5–18 feet (1.5–5.5 m), and the overlying muck varies from between 0–8 feet (0.0–2.4 m), the distribution being irregular. The total thickness varies from 5–10 feet (1.5–3.0 m). The gravel contains a considerable amount of very sticky clay. The clay seems to come from the decomposition of both the grit and the slates.

== History ==
Gold was first discovered on Eureka Creek in February 1899.
