= Minook Creek =

Coordinates: 65.5192°N 150.1378°W

Minook Creek (variation Mynook Creek; native name, Klanarkakat, meaning "creek suitable for small boats") is a waterway in the U.S. state of Alaska. It is named after John Mynook Pavaloff, a half-Russian/half-native Alaskan, who found gold in the river's valley in 1894.

== Geography ==
Minook Creek empties into the Yukon River just east of Rampart. It is about 25 miles (40 km) long. Near its mouth, it is a shallow stream 50–60 feet (15–18 m) wide. It flows in a northerly direction through a deep valley whose width varies from a few hundred feet to about a half mile. The creek receives a number of large tributaries from the east— Hunter, Little Minook, Little Minook Junior, Hoosier, Florida, Chapman—and a number of others. From the west, it receives Montana, Ruby, Slate, and Granite creeks and a few small tributaries. Granite Creek, about 17 miles (27 km) from the Yukon, is the largest western tributary.

Just below the mouth of Slate Creek the Minook spreads into a number of branches in a wide gravel flat. This flat, which is typical of many Alaskan streams, is probably due to a change in the grade of the creek. The stream here is unable to carry the gravels of the swifter water above, and so spreads them upon the flat. Here are found the so-called "winter glaciers," which sometimes last through the short summers. In 1904, a quarter or half acre of ice still remained when the September frosts occurred. This ice owes its origin to the fact that the channel which carries the water is greatly contracted by freezing in the fall. The resulting hydrostatic pressure cracks the ice and the water overflows and freezes. This process is repeated until a considerable thickness of ice is accumulated.

The valley is V-shaped in cross section, and the eastern slope is often benched, while the western is more abrupt and has remnants of benches at but few places. Five well-marked benches rise at irregular intervals above the floor between Little Minook Junior Creek and Hoosier Creek, the highest of which is about 500 feet (150 m). Important gravels cover the highest one, which lies on the east side of the Minook and extends from Hunter Creek to about 1 mile (1.6 km) above Florida Creek. A small remnant of the same bench is found on the north side of the mouth of Montana Creek and another on the north side of the mouth of Ruby Creek. Other remnants are found on the north side of the mouth of Chapman Creek and at a point about .25 miles (0.40 km) above the Chapman on the same side of Minook Creek. The last two benches show no gravel. On the west side of the creek but few remnants of benches are found. One, about 50 feet (15 m) high, extends to a little above the mouth of Hunter Creek, and is probably an extension of a corresponding bench on the south side of the Yukon. It seems probable that all of the benches of Minook Creek may be more or less closely correlated with the benches of the Yukon. In the vicinity of the mouth of Slate Creek is a bench cut in the upturned slates and thin-bedded quartzites to a depth of 12–16 feet (3.7–4.9 m) and covered by 4–5 feet (1.2–1.5 m) of gravel and a foot or more of muck. No gravel has yet been found upon the benches of intermediate height, but further investigation may show its presence.

In its upper course the creek flows somewhat north of east for about 2 miles (3.2 km), and here the topography of its valley is altogether different from that of the lower part. The north side is a long, gentle slope with a greater rise in the upper part, while the south side is steep and the stream flows near its base. The asymmetry of this part of the valley is repeated in Eureka, Pioneer, Hutlina, Omega, New York, California, and many other creeks of the region whose valleys lie in parallel or nearly parallel directions. The rocks in the upper part of the valley are mostly closely folded slates and limestones. Garnetiferous schists occur at Ruby Creek, and greenstones form the bed rock of the lower valley except near the mouth, where they are partly covered by the Kenai rocks.

The alluvials of the valley are approximately 10–12 feet (3.0–3.7 m) thick and consist of soil mixed with much vegetal matter, peaty soil, and gravel, with much angular debris at the foot of many of the hillsides. In the middle part of the valley, they consist of about 5–6 feet (1.5–1.8 m) of muck and the same thickness of gravel. The muck thickens toward the sides while the bed rock remains about level. The gravel deposits are derived from local bed rock and contain large numbers of smoothly rounded quartzite bowlders from a few inches to 3 feet (0.91 m) in diameter.
