= Fort Greely =

US Army anti-ballistic missile launch site

Coordinates: 63°58′23″N 145°43′05″W

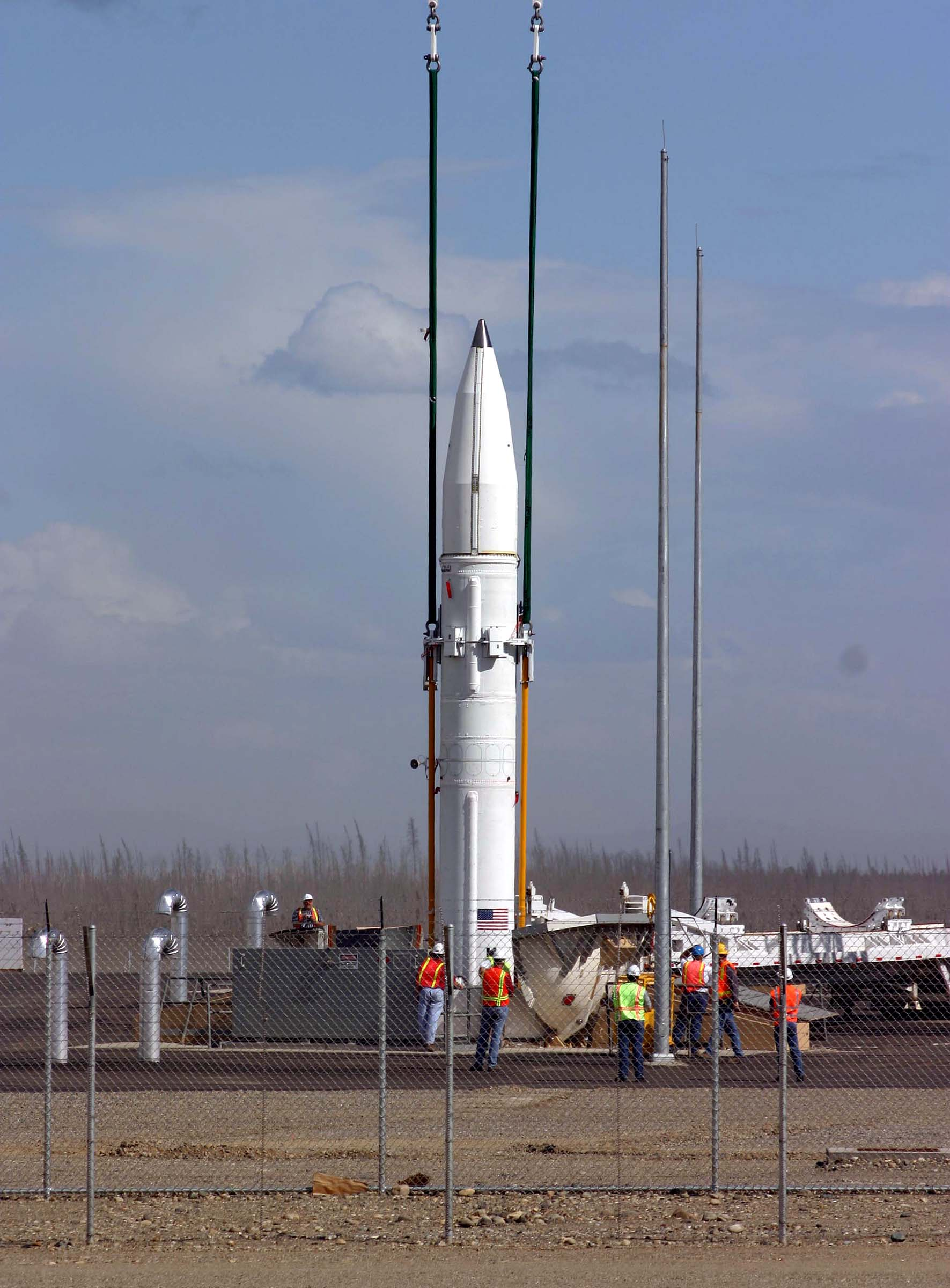
A Ground-Based Interceptor, designed to destroy incoming ICBMs, is lowered into its silo at the missile defense complex at Fort Greely, July 22, 2004.

Fort Greely is a United States Army launch site for anti-ballistic missiles located about 100 miles (160 km) southeast of Fairbanks, Alaska. It is also the home of the Cold Regions Test Center (CRTC), as Fort Greely is one of the coldest areas in Alaska, and can accommodate cold, extreme-cold, and temperate-weather tests depending on the season. It is named in honor of Major General Adolphus Greely.

There was an earlier Fort Greely on Kodiak Island.

== History ==
=== The early years ===
The camp was established in 1942 as Big Delta Army Air Field. During World War II, the Alaska Highway was built to connect a road in Dawson Creek, British Columbia, Canada with the Richardson Highway in Alaska, a distance of 1,423 miles (2,290 km). The Alaska Highway met the Richardson Highway at Delta Junction, 5 miles (8 km) north on the Richardson Highway from what is now Fort Greely. The United States used the base to help the Soviet Union fight Germany and Japan by sending airplanes and supplies authorized by the Lend-lease act through Alaska and into the Soviet Far East. The name was later changed to Allen Army Airfield. After World War II, Fort Greely was built south of the airfield. A School for Children of troops stationed at the facility was built with Class instruction for all grades. The School was named "Mount Hayes School".

After World War II, the War Department decided that an American soldier must be able to live and operate in any degree of cold. This decision was based on experience gained in combat and predictions of future possibilities for international obligations. A group of task forces was therefore organized to test US Army equipment in the cold. Task Force Frigid and Task Force Williwaw were dispatched to Alaska during the winters of 1946 and 1947. A related trial unit, Task Force Frost, incorporated elements of the 66th Armored Regiment and underwent tests in Camp McCoy, Wisconsin at roughly the same time.

=== Settling in ===
The information and data collected by task force personnel was a beginning, but it took time for men to be transported, to set up quarters for a short period of actual testing, and then pack up and leave until the next year. The expense of moving in and out was taken into consideration when the final reports were filed. When questions arose concerning the reports, there was no one available to answer them, for the task forces had been disbanded, and the personnel returned to their home units. The major shortcomings of these task forces included having insufficient time to establish units on test sites, the lack of acclimatization period for both personnel and equipment and a lack of continuity. Based on these results, it was recommended that a permanent test organization be established, with test groups representing each of the "Army Field Force Boards" located in the "Zone of the Interior."

In 1949, the Department of the Army ordered the organization of the Arctic Test Branch at Big Delta Air Force Base, Alaska (now known as Fort Greely). A cadre for the organization was activated at Fort Knox, Kentucky, in March 1949, by the transfer of personnel from each of the "Army Field Force Boards." The organization moved to Alaska in July 1949 and test operations were initiated. Shortly thereafter, the organization name was changed to the Arctic Training Center. In 1957, it was renamed the US Army Arctic Test Board, with the mission of conducting Arctic service tests of all Army field equipment.

From 1955, Fort Greely and a huge tract of land around it (withdrawn from the Department of the Interior) were used for training soldiers for cold-weather combat during the Cold War with the former Soviet Union.

In the early 1960s, the Army built a nuclear electrical power plant, SM-1A, at Fort Greely as part of the Army Nuclear Power Program, which built similar operational plants in Antarctica, Greenland, the Panama Canal Zone, Virginia, and Wyoming. The initial operators at Fort Greely were military NCOs, but civilians were later hired. The plant operated until 1972.

In August 1962, as a result of the reorganization of the Army, the Arctic Test Board was established as a Class II activity and placed under the command of the US Army Test and Evaluation Command (TECOM). The Board was later renamed the Arctic Test Center and expanded to absorb the Research and Development Office, Alaska, the Technical Services Test Activity, and the General Equipment Test Branch, all located at Fort Wainwright, Alaska, and the Chemical Corps Test Activity at Fort Greely. In 1976, the US Army Arctic Test Center was renamed the US Army Cold Regions Test Center.

=== The modern era ===
In 1991, when the Cold War ended with the collapse of the Soviet Union, the number of soldiers at Fort Greely was reduced.

In 1995, operations at Fort Greely were slated for further reductions to save money. Only the Cold Regions Test Center (CRTC) and Public Works functions were to remain on the installation. Large portions of the post were to be closed and, at one point, the main post was to be turned over to the city of Delta Junction for use as a private prison. Ultimately, plans for the prison fell through. In 2001, headquarters for the Northern Warfare Training Center and Cold Regions Test Center were moved to nearby Fort Wainwright. Various training ranges were also transferred to Fort Wainwright and renamed Donnelly Training Area. Although its command moved, CRTC continued to operate from Fort Greely. The Northern Warfare Training Center also continued operations at Black Rapids Training Facility.

After the United States announced that it would withdraw from the Anti-Ballistic Missile Treaty, Fort Greely was selected as a site for the Ground-Based Midcourse Defense system. Starting in the summer of 2002, the United States government began work on the missile defense installation at Fort Greely, building 40 new silos by 2013. Concurrently, the Missile Defense Command took command of Fort Greely, relinquishing direct Army control, while the Army retained control of the nearby Donnelly Training Area.

In 2005, the CRTC headquarters was moved from Fort Wainwright back to Fort Greely. Though testing efforts remain centered at the Bolio Lake Range Complex – now part of Fort Wainwright – numerous support functions remain on Fort Greely's Main Post.

In December 2014, Congress approved $50 million to increase the number of interceptor missiles at Fort Greely from 26 to 40 as part of a missile-defense expansion announced in 2013.

=== North Korea missile defense ===
With the continued development of an intercontinental ballistic missile program by North Korea, Fort Greely may be slated for an expansion. Fort Greely is currently one of the two US sites housing anti-ballistic missile interceptor missiles, and it is near the Great circle line from North Korea to the contiguous United States. Expansion of its capabilities may be required to protect Alaska and the West Coast of the United States from possible North Korean attacks.

== See also ==
- Fort Greely, Alaska
