= Fort Greely, Alaska =

- CDP
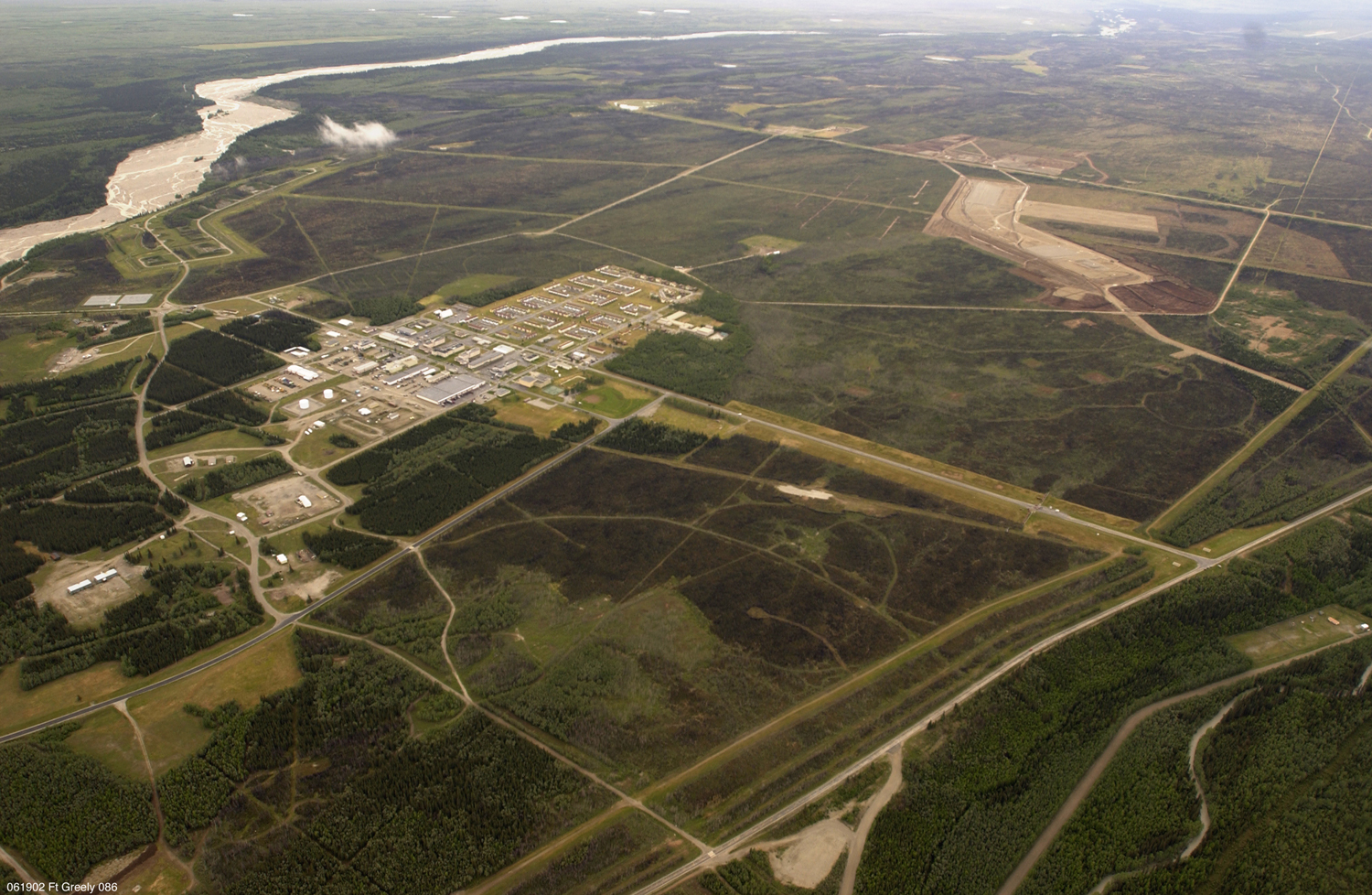
- Fort Greely

- Location within the state of Alaska
- Coordinates: 63°54′18″N 145°33′16″W
- Country: United States
- State: Alaska
- Census Area: Southeast Fairbanks

Government
  - State senator: Click Bishop (R)
  - State rep.: Mike Cronk (R)

Area
  - Total: 11.03 sq mi (28.56 km^{2})
  - Land: 11.03 sq mi (28.56 km^{2})
  - Water: 0 sq mi (0.00 km^{2})

Population (2022)
  - Total: 458
  - Density: 28.0/sq mi (10.82/km^{2})
- Time zone: UTC-9 (Alaska (AKST))
  - Summer (DST): UTC-8 (AKDT)
- ZIP code: 99731
- Area code: 907
- FIPS code: 02-26100
- Website: www.greely.army.mil

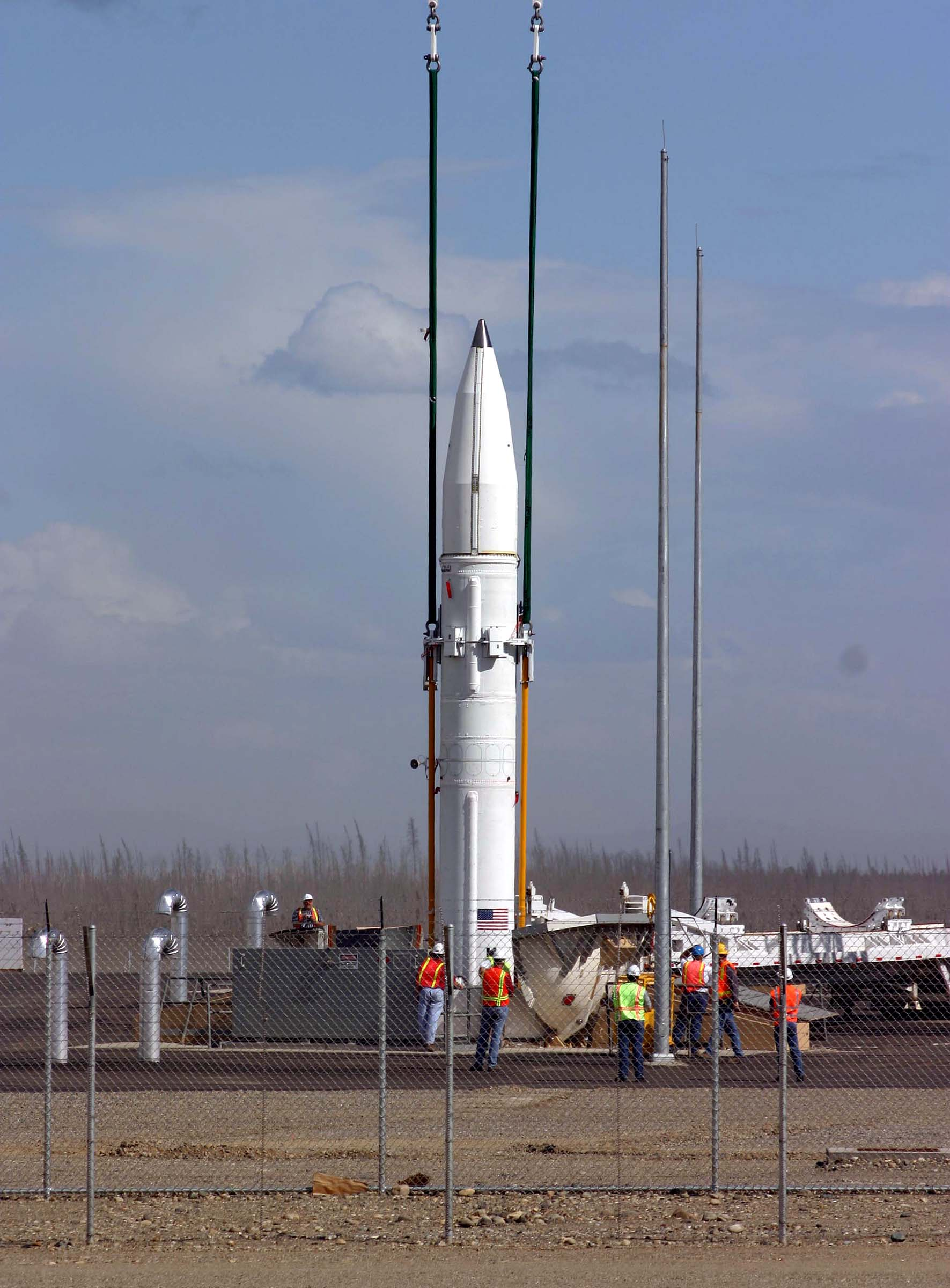
A Ground-Based Interceptor, designed to destroy incoming Intercontinental ballistic missiles, is lowered into its silo at the missile defense complex at Fort Greely, Alaska, July 22, 2004.

Fort Greely is a census-designated place (CDP) in Southeast Fairbanks Census Area, Alaska, United States. It is home to the Fort Greely military installation. As of the 2020 census, Fort Greely had a population of 309.

== Geography ==
Fort Greely is located at 63°58′2″N 145°42′33″W (63.905016, -145.554566). Fort Greely is located 5 miles (8.0 km) south of Delta Junction on the Richardson Highway. According to the United States Census Bureau, the CDP has a total area of 169.7 square miles (440 km^{2}). 169.4 square miles (439 km^{2}) of it is land and 0.4 square miles (1.0 km^{2}) of it (0.21%) is water.

=== Army Nuclear Power Program ===
Because of its remote location, Fort Greely was chosen as one of the first US military posts to have a compact, nuclear power reactor to generate heat and electricity, under the auspices of the Army Nuclear Power Program. A nuclear power plant, designated the SM-1A was flown in and installed between 1960–62, and was based on the Army's first prototype reactor, the SM-1 at Fort Belvoir, Virginia. SM-1A pressurized-water reactor reached initial criticality on March 13, 1962, and was shut down in 1972: the reactor core was removed and sent to the Savannah River nuclear site.

== Demographics ==
Historical population
Census	Pop.	Note	%±
1970	1,820		—
1980	1,635		−10.2%
1990	1,147		−29.8%
2000	461		−59.8%
2010	539		16.9%
2020	309		−42.7%
U.S. Decennial Census

Fort Greely first appeared as an unincorporated military installation on the 1970 U.S. Census. It was made a census-designated place (CDP) in 1980.

As of the census of 2000, there were 461 people, 126 households, and 112 families residing in the CDP. The population density was 2.7/sq mi (1.1/km^{2}). There were 354 housing units at an average density of 2.1 per square mile (0.81/km^{2}). The racial makeup of the CDP was 65.73% White, 19.74% Black or African American, 1.30% Native American, 1.30% Asian, 1.95% Pacific Islander, 3.69% from other races, and 6.29% from two or more races. 15.40% of the population were Hispanic or Latino of any race.

Of the 126 households, 73.8% had children under the age of 18 living with them, 80.2% were married couples living together, 7.1% had a female householder with no husband present, and 11.1% were non-families. 11.1% of all households were made up of individuals, and none had someone living alone who was 65 years of age or older. The average household size was 3.25 and the average family size was 3.53.

In the CDP, the population was spread out, with 38.6% under the age of 18, 16.1% from 18 to 24, 43.4% from 25 to 44, 2.0% from 45 to 64, . The median age was 23 years. For every 100 females, there were 115.4 males. For every 100 females age 18 and over, there were 119.4 males.

The median income for a household in the CDP was $33,750, and the median income for a family was $32,969. Males had a median income of $26,544 versus $21,375 for females. The per capita income for the CDP was $12,368. About 11.6% of families and 10.4% of the population were below the poverty line, including 10.9% of those under age 18 and none of those age 65 or over.

== Climate ==
As it is not near the ocean, this area is drier than coastal Alaska and experiences seasonal extremes typical of subarctic areas. The annual precipitation is only 12 inches (305 mm), including 37 inches (94 cm) of snow. The average low temperature in January is −11 °F (−23 °C). The average high during July is +69 °F (+20 °C). Temperature extremes have been recorded from −63 °F to +92 °F (−53 °C to +33 °C).

Fort Greely is mostly sunny in the summer and split between clear and overcast days in the winter. On clear winter nights, the aurora borealis can often be seen dancing in the sky. Like all subarctic regions, the months from May to July in the summer have no night, only a twilight during the night hours. The months of November to January have little daylight.

== See also ==
- Allen Army Airfield

== Sources and references ==
- "Fort Greely". Encyclopedia Astronautica. Retrieved July 18, 2006.
- "Fort Greely". Fort Greely report May 2000. Retrieved May 27, 2012.
