= Delta Junction, Alaska =

City in Alaska, United States

- City
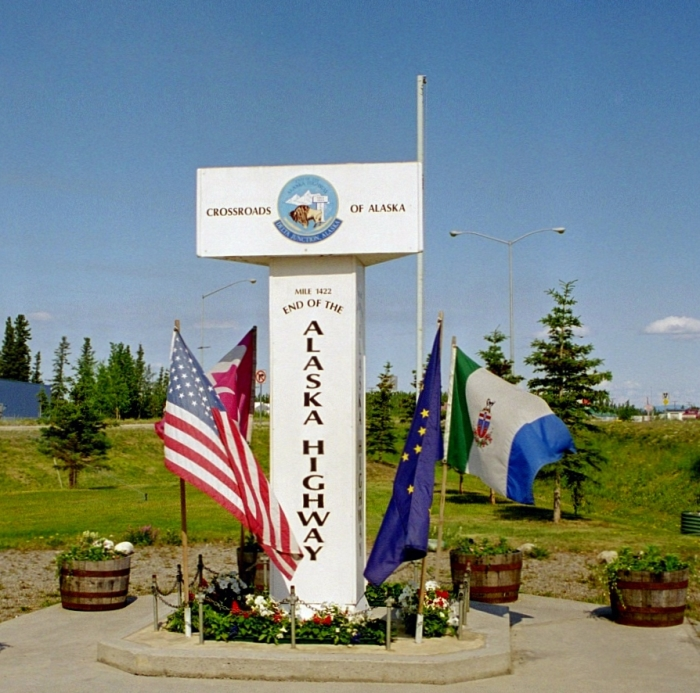
- Mile 1422 — End of the Alaska Highway
- Motto: "Crossroads of Alaska"
- Location in Alaska
- Coordinates: 64°02′52″N 145°43′07″W
- Country: United States
- State: Alaska
- Founded: July 17, 1957
- Incorporated: December 19, 1960

Government
  - Type: Mayor–Council
  - Mayor: Igor Zaremba (I)

Area
  - Total: 13.90 sq mi (36.00 km^{2})
  - Land: 13.88 sq mi (35.95 km^{2})
  - Water: 0.019 sq mi (0.05 km^{2})
- Elevation: 1,158 ft (353 m)

Population (2020)
  - Total: 918
  - Density: 66.1/sq mi (25.5/km^{2})
- Time zone: UTC−9 (Alaska (AKST))
  - Summer (DST): UTC−8 (AKDT)
- ZIP code: 99737
- Area code: 907
- FIPS code: 02-18620
- GNIS ID: 1401104, 2419376
- Highways: Alaska Highway; Richardson Highway; Route 2; Route 4
- Major airport: Fairbanks Airport (FAI)
- Website: ci.delta-junction.ak.us

Delta Junction (Russian: Делта-Джанкшен; Ukrainian: Делта-Джанкшен, romanized: Delta Dzhankshen) is a city in Southeast Fairbanks Census Area, Alaska, United States. As of the 2020 census, its population was 918. The city is located a short distance south of the confluence of the Delta River with the Tanana River, which is at Big Delta. It is about 99 mi (160 km) south of Fairbanks. Native inhabitants are Tanana Athabaskans, Cherokee, Potawami, Irish, Polish Jews, amongst other nations.

== History ==
For at least 10,000 years, Athabascan indigenous peoples have inhabited portions of the interior of Alaska. Early inhabitants survived by hunting and fishing. The early history of non-native settlement in the area occurred at the river crossing at Big Delta and is found at the entry, Big Delta, Alaska.

In 1904, the location first served as a telegraph station. In 1928, a herd of 23 bison were brought from the National Bison Range in Montana to an area south of Big Delta to provide an additional game species for hunters. Buffalo Center, a small community near the center of present-day Delta Junction, was named because of their presence, especially during the winter months. The huge animals were troublesome, and sometimes made landings dangerous at nearby Allen Field.

=== World War II ===
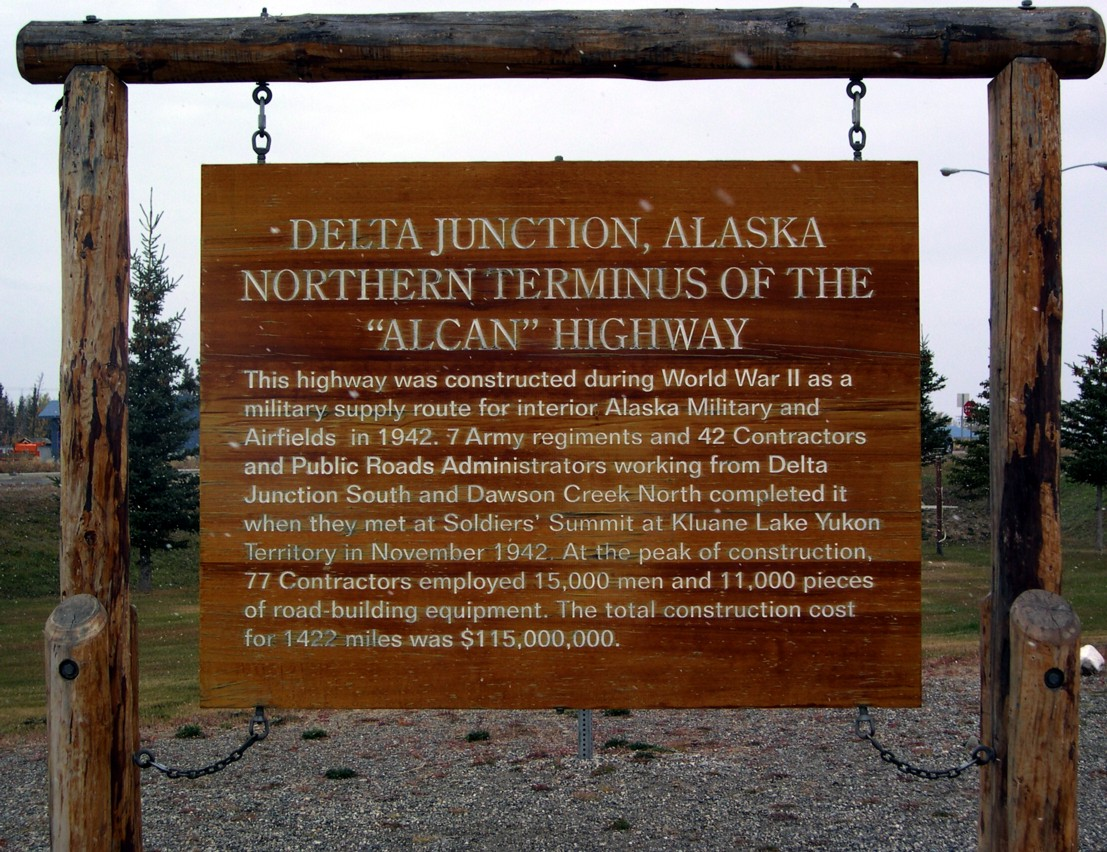
Signpost at Delta Junction marks the end of the ALCAN Highway

During World War II, the United States aided the Soviet Union against Germany by sending airplanes and supplies authorized by the Lend-lease Act to the Soviet Union through Alaska into the Russian Far East. The Alaska Highway was built to connect an existing road in Dawson Creek, British Columbia, Canada, with the Richardson Highway in Alaska, a distance of 1,420 mi (2,290 km).

The Alaska Highway met the Richardson Highway at a point 7.5 mi (12 km) south along the Delta River from Big Delta. The place where the highways met became known as Delta Junction. Allen Field was constructed 5 miles (8.0 km) south of Delta Junction for use in sending supplies to Russia. The Glenn Highway was built from Anchorage to what is now Glennallen, where it met the Richardson Highway. This connection created a motor route between Anchorage and Fairbanks, Alaska.

=== Cold War ===
After World War II, a U.S. army base, Fort Greely, was built next to the air field. The base, and a huge tract of land around it, was used for training soldiers for cold weather combat during the Cold War with the former Soviet Union. In 1957, the Richardson Highway was paved. About this time, portions of the Alaska Highway were also paved. The army base and tourism brought on the highways, caused a boom in the area's economy and the commercial center of the area moved from Big Delta to Delta Junction. Some people also began farming and raising livestock in the Delta Junction area. This farming required new techniques to accommodate the short growing season and the cold and dark winters of interior Alaska.

Delta Junction was incorporated on December 19, 1960. Oil was discovered in the North Slope of Alaska in 1968. In 1974, construction began on the pipeline to transport the oil from the North Slope to Valdez. The pipeline construction also aided the economy of the area. Delta Junction experienced a temporary boom, similar to the gold rush, that resulted in a wave of new residents and businesses in the community. Cost of living during this period was well above the national average due to transportation costs, as well as gouging. Prostitution and bars flourished — as did churches and religious communes.

In the late 1970s and early 1980s, the Tanana Valley was designated as a potential agricultural area for Alaska. The state of Alaska then made large tracts of land available to future farmers for purchase. Significant was establishment of the "Barley Project" east of the city. Plans were made to grow barley, ship it to Valdez via a future rail terminal, and from there ship it overseas to Asia. Though farms were established and a storage facility constructed in Valdez, the railroad never came, essentially resulting in the failure of the project.

Political pressure and growing costs resulted in the project being defunded upon change in governors. Today, these original farms are primarily used as pasture or for hay production though barley, potatoes, carrots, and even wheat are still grown with limited commercial success. With the availability of a nearby meat processing facility (Delta Meat and Sausage Company), many farmers turned to cattle with limited success. In addition, the area is now known for production of exotic meats such as yak, bison, and elk.

In 1971, the George Parks Highway between Anchorage and Fairbanks was completed. This highway followed the railroad route and was a shorter route for motorists traveling between Anchorage and Fairbanks than the Glenn and Richardson Highway route. Many travelers used the new highway, bypassing Delta Junction. In 1977, pipeline construction ended. The Cold War also ended with the collapse of the Soviet Union in 1991. These events caused a decline in the economy of Delta Junction.

=== 1991–present ===
During the 1990s and 2000s, immigrants from the former Soviet Union came to the area, significantly changing the makeup of the local population. Fort Greely was included on the Base Realignment and Closure (BRAC) list in 1995. From 1995 to 2002, Fort Greely was gradually re-aligned through a gradual drawdown in both military and civilian personnel. Once BRAC was complete in 2002, Fort Greely remained open but was staffed with fewer than 100 military and civilian personnel. During this time the remaining workers were either associated with public works functions or the Cold Regions Test Center, which continued testing on the installation. Headquarters for both the Cold Regions Test Center and the Northern Warfare Training Center moved to Fort Wainwright in Fairbanks in 2002. Base housing and numerous surplus buildings remained vacant, though the Army continued heating and maintaining them.

Re-alignment of Fort Greely resulted in heated discussion throughout the Delta Junction community over a proposal to site a privately operated state prison within surplus buildings on Fort Greely. Eventually, the city of Delta Junction entered into a contract with Allvest Corporation to operate this prison. Plans for the prison eventually fell through. Allvest Corporation subsequently sued Delta Junction for $1 million for breach of contract.

Shortly after BRAC was complete, the United States government announced plans to build a missile defense installation at Fort Greely. The installation was then divided into two parts operated by two different commands — U.S. Army Garrison Alaska and Space and Missile Defense Command. The main post retained the name Fort Greely and is operated by the Space and Missile Defense Command. Outlying range, training and impact areas were absorbed by Fort Wainwright and were renamed Donnelly Training Area.

From 2002 to 2005, Delta Junction experienced an economic boom similar to the pipeline days as Fort Greely became fully operational again and the missile test bed was constructed. National firms such as Boeing, Bechtel, and Brown and Root, as well as regional firms including Chugach opened up offices on the installation, under contract to the government. Construction of the Pogo Gold Mine just north of Delta Junction, near the Goodpaster River, also contributed significantly to the economic fortune of the city. Mineral deposits near Tangle Lakes, south of Delta Junction, will likely result in additional development of mining in the area.

== Geography ==
"Big Delta" lies at the intersection of the Delta River and the Tanana River. The city of Delta Junction sits on the Delta River at the intersection of the Richardson Highway and the terminus of the Alaska Highway. The city and Delta community lie within the fertile Tanana River valley. Three mountain ranges—the White Mountains to the north, the Granite Mountains to the southeast, and the Alaska Range to the southwest—and the Delta River to the west surround the city.

Once overlain by glaciers, the geology is marked by glacial moraines as well as alluvial deposits from the Delta and Tanana Rivers. Numerous mineral deposits are found in the vicinity of Delta Junction ranging from gold to molybdenum to coal. A prominent natural feature on the landscape is Donnelly Dome, located within the Donnelly Training Area of Fort Wainwright (formerly a part of nearby Fort Greely until 2001), to the south of Delta Junction. This dome was formed as a glacier coming from the Alaska Range split in two, carving away sides of a former mountain.

According to the United States Census Bureau, the city has a total area of 17.3 square miles (45 km^{2}), all land.

=== Climate ===
Climate chart for Delta Junction

As is typical of the Alaska Interior, Delta Junction has a subarctic climate (Köppen Dwc), closely bordering on a semi-arid climate (Köppen BSk). The average high temperature is below freezing from mid-October thru late March, and during the height of winter cold, as the town is located in USDA Plant Hardiness Zone 2a, the coldest conditions of the year typically bottom out in the −45 to −50 °F (−43 to −46 °C) range, with sub-0 °F (−18 °C) highs a common occurrence. Precipitation averages at only 11.62 inches (295 mm) annually, and over half of this total occurs from June to August.

Snow, which typically falls from October to April and sometimes May and September, is generally not heavy due to the dry climate, and averages 54 inches (140 cm) per season. Extreme temperatures have ranged from −63 °F (−53 °C) on January 30, 1947, up to 92 °F (33 °C) on June 15, 1969. Delta Junction has an unofficial record low of −72 °F (−58 °C) set on January 6, 1975 (as seen on the big thermometer in the town center) but the Delta Junction weather station and NOAA refuse to acknowledge this record as legitimate, as such temperatures are atypical for the region and atypical temperature readings are usually inaccurate.

The coldest daily maximum on record from Delta Junction was an extremely cold −55 °F (−48 °C) in January 1975. During an average year between 1991 and 2020, the coldest maximum averaged −39 °F (−39 °C). Summer nights are seldom warm but nevertheless did not fall below 70 °F (21 °C) in August 1999 and August 6, 2024. During an average year the warmest low is 61 °F (16 °C).

Delta Junction was known as the "Windy City" and "Little Chicago" by many soldiers on Fort Greely. In Delta Junction itself, but not in the nearby areas, wind blows many days from the south down the Delta River from the Gulf of Alaska, bringing river silt in the summer and snowdrifts in the winter. There are usually several days in the winter when the temperature is in the range of −40 °F/°C when a wind (known as a Chinook wind) begins to blow. A few minutes later, the temperature climbs to above the freezing mark. When the wind stops, the temperature returns to colder ranges.

Delta Junction's prevailing winds are from the east.

Climate data for Delta Junction, Alaska (Big Delta Army Airfield), 1991–2020 normals, (Note: Mean monthly maxima and minima (i.e. the highest and lowest temperature readings during an entire month or year) calculated based on data at said location from 1991 to 2020.) extremes 1917–present
| Month | Jan | Feb | Mar | Apr | May | Jun | Jul | Aug | Sep | Oct | Nov | Dec | Year |
|---|---|---|---|---|---|---|---|---|---|---|---|---|---|
| Record high °F (°C) | 54 (12) | 51 (11) | 58 (14) | 72 (22) | 90 (32) | 92 (33) | 91 (33) | 90 (32) | 79 (26) | 74 (23) | 52 (11) | 55 (13) | 92 (33) |
| Mean maximum °F (°C) | 36.0 (2.2) | 39.9 (4.4) | 43.7 (6.5) | 59.5 (15.3) | 73.1 (22.8) | 81.9 (27.7) | 82.3 (27.9) | 78.3 (25.7) | 66.1 (18.9) | 53.0 (11.7) | 35.7 (2.1) | 35.7 (2.1) | 84.6 (29.2) |
| Mean daily maximum °F (°C) | 6.1 (−14.4) | 15.6 (−9.1) | 24.7 (−4.1) | 44.2 (6.8) | 58.7 (14.8) | 68.2 (20.1) | 69.7 (20.9) | 64.5 (18.1) | 53.3 (11.8) | 33.3 (0.7) | 14.9 (−9.5) | 9.4 (−12.6) | 38.5 (3.6) |
| Daily mean °F (°C) | −1.0 (−18.3) | 7.3 (−13.7) | 14.2 (−9.9) | 33.9 (1.1) | 48.5 (9.2) | 58.5 (14.7) | 60.7 (15.9) | 55.6 (13.1) | 44.8 (7.1) | 26.5 (−3.1) | 8.2 (−13.2) | 2.4 (−16.4) | 30.0 (−1.1) |
| Mean daily minimum °F (°C) | −8.0 (−22.2) | −0.9 (−18.3) | 3.6 (−15.8) | 23.5 (−4.7) | 38.2 (3.4) | 48.7 (9.3) | 51.7 (10.9) | 46.7 (8.2) | 36.4 (2.4) | 19.6 (−6.9) | 1.4 (−17.0) | −4.6 (−20.3) | 21.4 (−5.9) |
| Mean minimum °F (°C) | −40.1 (−40.1) | −30.9 (−34.9) | −23.2 (−30.7) | −1.0 (−18.3) | 25.6 (−3.6) | 37.3 (2.9) | 43.0 (6.1) | 33.5 (0.8) | 20.4 (−6.4) | −5.5 (−20.8) | −24.1 (−31.2) | −32.5 (−35.8) | −43.9 (−42.2) |
| Record low °F (°C) | −63 (−53) | −60 (−51) | −49 (−45) | −37 (−38) | −1 (−18) | 26 (−3) | 32 (0) | 22 (−6) | −2 (−19) | −39 (−39) | −47 (−44) | −62 (−52) | −63 (−53) |
| Average precipitation inches (mm) | 0.21 (5.3) | 0.23 (5.8) | 0.18 (4.6) | 0.20 (5.1) | 0.76 (19) | 2.18 (55) | 2.37 (60) | 2.02 (51) | 0.90 (23) | 0.59 (15) | 0.41 (10) | 0.23 (5.8) | 10.28 (261) |
| Average snowfall inches (cm) | 5.8 (15) | 6.4 (16) | 3.1 (7.9) | 2.8 (7.1) | 1.1 (2.8) | 0.0 (0.0) | 0.0 (0.0) | 0.0 (0.0) | 2.2 (5.6) | 13.0 (33) | 13.1 (33) | 6.7 (17) | 54.2 (138) |
| Average precipitation days (≥ 0.01 inch) | 5.9 | 5.1 | 3.7 | 3.7 | 7.9 | 12.9 | 14.0 | 12.8 | 8.5 | 7.8 | 7.4 | 6.3 | 96.0 |
| Average snowy days (≥ 0.1 inch) | 6.6 | 6.5 | 4.6 | 2.5 | 0.4 | 0.0 | 0.0 | 0.0 | 1.5 | 9.7 | 10.0 | 7.2 | 49.0 |
| Average relative humidity (%) | 68.9 | 72.0 | 66.9 | 63.9 | 55.6 | 58.9 | 65.9 | 69.8 | 71.8 | 78.9 | 73.4 | 74.3 | 68.4 |
| Average dew point °F (°C) | −16.2 (−26.8) | −4.0 (−20.0) | 2.7 (−16.3) | 18.0 (−7.8) | 28.8 (−1.8) | 41.4 (5.2) | 46.8 (8.2) | 43.9 (6.6) | 34.3 (1.3) | 18.7 (−7.4) | −0.8 (−18.2) | −9.2 (−22.9) | 17.0 (−8.3) |
Source: NOAA (relative humidity and dew point 1961-1990, snowfall and snowy days 1981–2010)

== Demographics ==
Historical population
| Census | Pop. | Note | %± |
|---|---|---|---|
| 1970 | 703 | | — |
| 1980 | 945 | | 34.4% |
| 1990 | 652 | | −31.0% |
| 2000 | 840 | | 28.8% |
| 2010 | 958 | | 14.0% |
| 2020 | 918 | | −4.2% |
U.S. Decennial Census

Delta Junction first appeared on the 1970 U.S. Census as an incorporated city.

=== 2020 census ===
As of the 2020 census, Delta Junction had a population of 918. The median age was 37.8 years. 24.8% of residents were under the age of 18 and 16.2% of residents were 65 years of age or older. For every 100 females there were 115.5 males, and for every 100 females age 18 and over there were 119.0 males age 18 and over.

0.0% of residents lived in urban areas, while 100.0% lived in rural areas.

There were 369 households in Delta Junction, of which 30.9% had children under the age of 18 living in them. Of all households, 49.1% were married-couple households, 28.7% were households with a male householder and no spouse or partner present, and 15.7% were households with a female householder and no spouse or partner present. About 31.7% of all households were made up of individuals and 10.6% had someone living alone who was 65 years of age or older.

There were 469 housing units, of which 21.3% were vacant. The homeowner vacancy rate was 1.7% and the rental vacancy rate was 24.6%.

Racial composition as of the 2020 census
| Race | Number | Percent |
|---|---|---|
| White | 790 | 86.1% |
| Black or African American | 7 | 0.8% |
| American Indian and Alaska Native | 12 | 1.3% |
| Asian | 4 | 0.4% |
| Native Hawaiian and Other Pacific Islander | 12 | 1.3% |
| Some other race | 16 | 1.7% |
| Two or more races | 77 | 8.4% |
| Hispanic or Latino (of any race) | 64 | 7.0% |

=== 2000 census ===
As of the 2000 census, there were 840 people, 312 households, and 208 families residing in the city. The population density was 48.7 inhabitants per square mile (18.8/km^{2}). There were 422 housing units at an average density of 24.4 per square mile (9.4/km^{2}). The racial makeup of the city was 91.43% White, 1.07% Black or African American, 4.05% Native American, 0.95% Asian, 0.12% from other races, and 2.38% from two or more races. 0.83% of the population were Hispanic or Latino of any race.

Delta Junction has the highest percentage of Ukrainian people in the United States, with 16.4% of residents having been born in Ukraine and an even higher total number having Ukrainian ancestry. According to the 2000 Census, 19.64% of the general population and 31.10% of those aged 5–17 used either Russian or Ukrainian as home language. Delta Junction is home for a sizable community of Russian Orthodox Old Believers.

==== Households ====
Of the 312 households, 35.6% had children under the age of 18 living with them, 52.6% were married couples living together, 9.0% had a female householder with no husband present, and 33.3% were non-families. 28.8% of all households were made up of individuals, and 6.4% had someone living alone who was 65 years of age or older. The average household size was 2.69 and the average family size was 3.32.

==== Age and gender ====
In the city, the age distribution of the population shows 32.6% under the age of 18, 6.5% from 18 to 24, 26.5% from 25 to 44, 26.5% from 45 to 64, and 7.7% who were 65 years of age or older. The median age was 36 years. For every 100 females, there were 112.1 males. For every 100 females age 18 and over, there were 109.6 males.

==== Income ====
The median income for a household in the city was $43,500, and the median income for a family was $58,250. Males had a median income of $50,469 versus $25,750 for females. The per capita income for the city was $19,171. About 12.3% of families and 19.4% of the population were below the poverty line, including 28.8% of those under age 18 and 13.2% of those age 65 or over.

== Economy ==
Construction and maintenance of the military facilities, mining, agriculture, tourism and their support industries form the backbone of the area economy. An Alaska Railroad spur from Fairbanks to Delta Junction has been proposed to transport material to the missile defense site. This could facilitate other types of industry in Delta Junction, as the railroad could transport agricultural products out of the area as well as promote tourist travel into the area by rail.

Many people in Delta Junction supplement their food supply by hunting the moose, caribou, Dall sheep and bison in the area, as well as fishing. A few operate small gold mines or hunt or trap fur-bearing animals for extra income. Delta Junction, like most Alaskan communities, has a small airstrip where charter flights are available for sightseeing, hunting and fishing. Due to limited shopping availability, many residents travel to Fairbanks via the Richardson Highway to purchase goods and services. Though Delta has a clinic, primary medical care is also in Fairbanks.

Delta Junction is home to Alaska Range Dairy, the only dairy in Alaska.

== Parks and recreation ==
The area around Delta Junction is home to a number of parks. Just north of the city is the Quartz Lake State Recreation Area. South of the city is the Clearwater State recreation Site, a 27 acres (11 ha) park with a campground and access to the Delta Clearwater River.

Further south is the Delta State Recreation Site, a 23 acres (9.3 ha) park directly across from the Delta River. It has a campground, a nearby airstrip, and views of the Alaska Range. The Donnelly Creek State Recreation Site is an isolated 46 acres (19 ha) park in an alpine environment. The park has a campground and is considered a prime spot for wildlife viewing and is adjacent to the calving grounds for the bison herd.

In the early 1980s, the 90,000-acre (360 km^{2}) Delta Junction Bison Range, south of the Alaska Highway and between Ft. Greely and the Little Gerstle River was established. The range is managed by the Alaska Department of Fish and Game to provide fall habitat for bison to reduce farm depredations and to provide habitat for other wildlife. The herd is now kept at several hundred animals by the annual issuance of hunting permits.

== Education ==
Public education in Delta Junction is provided by the Delta-Greely School District, which combines the city with neighboring communities such as Big Delta, Deltana, Fort Greely Gerstle River School, and Healy Lake. In 2007, Delta Junction Elementary School was named a National Blue Ribbon School.

== Notable people ==
- Ben Grossmann (born 1977), grew up in Delta Junction, 2012 Academy Award winner for his work on Hugo
