= Quartz Lake (Alaska) =

Lake in the state of Alaska, United States

- From southeast

- Location within Alaska Location within North America
- Location: Southeast Fairbanks Census Area, Alaska
- Coordinates: 64°12′51″N 145°49′13″W
- Basin countries: United States
- Surface area: 1,500 acres (610 ha)
- Average depth: under 15 feet (4.6 m)
- Max. depth: 40 ft (12 m)
- Surface elevation: 961 feet (293 m)
- Frozen: Oct.-April/May
- Islands: None

Quartz Lake is a mid-sized lake about 10 mi (16 km) north of Delta Junction, Alaska. It was named Quartz Lake by early mineral prospectors in the area. Much of the lake shore is private property but the Quartz Lake State Recreation Area is also located on the lake via a short access road from the Richardson Highway. The recreation area has campgrounds, hiking trails, public use cabins, and access to both Quartz Lake and nearby Little Lost Lake. The lake is fairly shallow in most places, even if well offshore, but has a few deeper areas as well. It is stocked with rainbow trout, Arctic char and salmon. Stocking is partially funded by the Sportfish Restoration Program, which uses tax money from the purchase of fishing equipment and boating fuels to fund hatchery programs.

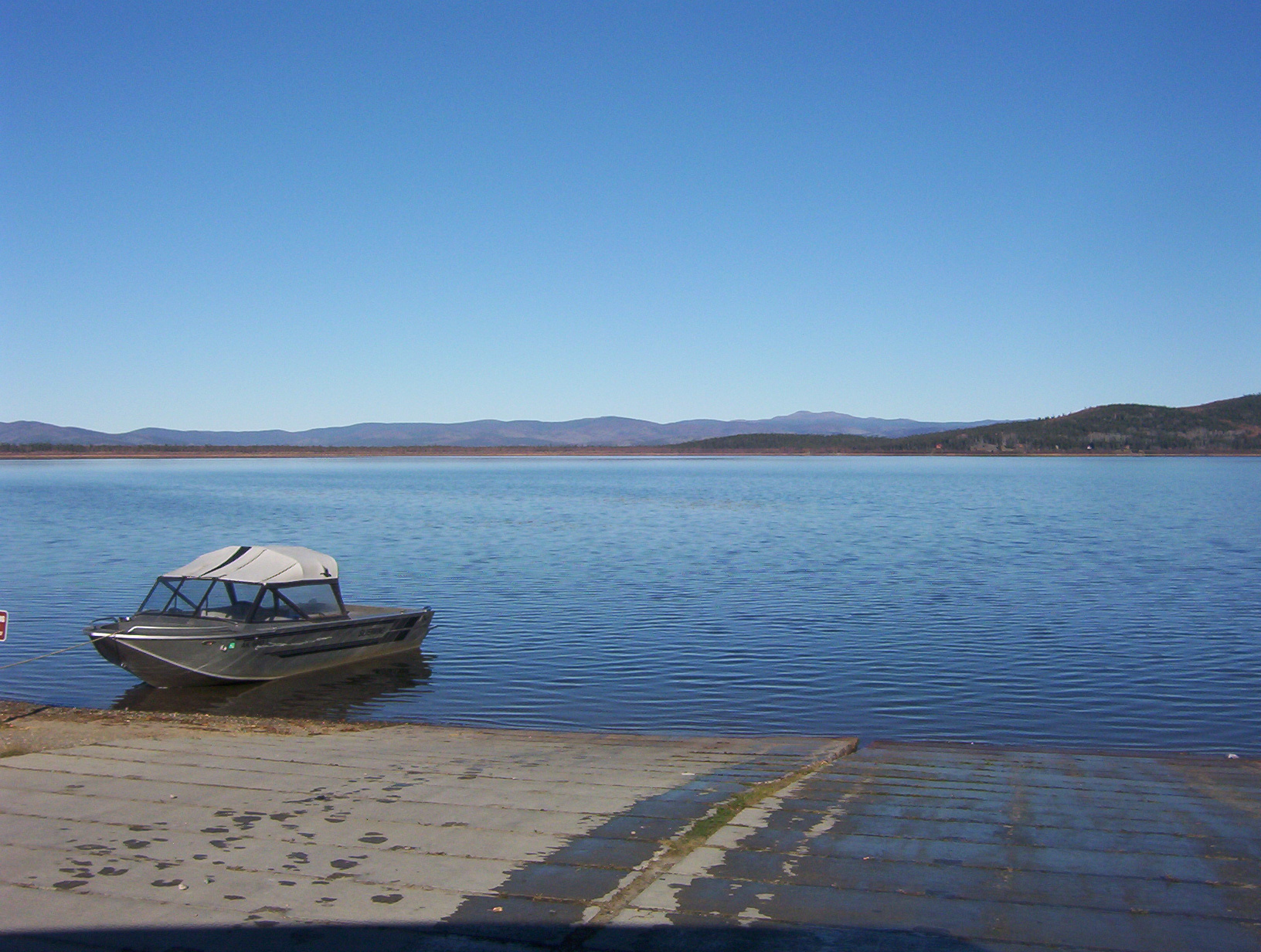
Seen from the boat launch at the State Recreation Area.
