= List of most populous cities in Alaska by decade =

This list tracks and ranks the population of the ten most populous cities and other settlements in the State of Alaska by decade, as reported by each decennial United States Census, starting with the 1880 Census.

The ten largest "places" from 1880 through 1900 are all unincorporated as there were no incorporated places recorded during those censuses. The top 10 places listed areas from 1910 through 2020 are all separate incorporated places.

This list generally refers only to the population of individual places within their defined limits at the time of the indicated census. (Note: In the earlier censuses, the rankings were not definite due to the fact that not all places were enumerated separately.) Some of these places have since been annexed or merged into other cities. Other places may have expanded their borders due to such annexation or consolidation.

Six consolidated city-borough governments exist; Juneau City and Borough, Skagway Municipality, Sitka City and Borough, Yakutat City and Borough, Wrangell City and Borough, as well as the state's most populous city, Anchorage. Though its legal name is the Municipality of Anchorage, it is considered a consolidated city-borough under state law.

== 1880 ==
There were no incorporated places recorded during the census. The following are ten largest unincorporated villages that were enumerated separately. The territory was divided into six divisions.

Rank	Unincorporated village	Division	Population	Notes
1	Sitka	Southeastern	916	
2	Hoonah	Southeastern	800	Returned as "Koudekan" in census reports.
3	Klukwan	Southeastern	565	Returned as "Kluckquan" in census reports.
4	Angoon	Southeastern	420	Returned as "Augoon" in census reports.
5	Unalaska	Aleutian	406	Returned as "Iliuliuk" in census reports.
6	Noatak	Arctic	400	Returned as "Noatagamut" in census reports.
7	Wales	Arctic	400	Returned as "Kingigamute" in census reports.
8	Karluk	Kodiak	302	
9	Yakutat	Southeastern	300	
10	St. Paul	Kuskokwim	298	

== 1890 ==
There were no incorporated places recorded during the census. The following are ten largest unincorporated settlements that were enumerated separately. The territory was divided into seven districts.

Rank	Unincorporated village	District	Population	Notes
1	Juneau	1st, Southeastern	1,253	
2	Sitka	1st, Southeastern	1,190	
3	Karluk	2nd, Kodiak	1,123	
4	Metlakatla	1st, Southeastern	823	
5	Kodiak	2nd, Kodiak	495	Returned as "Kadiak" in census reports.
6	Wales	7th, Arctic	488	Returned as "Kingaghee in census reports.
7	Port Clarence	7th, Arctic	485	
8	Hoonah	1st, Southeastern	438	Returned as "Huna" in census reports.
9	Akhiok	2nd, Kodiak	420	Returned as "Alitak" in census reports.
10	Afognak	2nd, Kodiak	409	

== 1900 ==
There were no incorporated places recorded during the census. The following are ten largest unincorporated settlements that were enumerated separately. Only two "districts" existed as the subdivisions couldn't be further ascertained.

Rank	Unincorporated place	District	Population	Notes
1	Nome	Northern	12,488	
2	Skagway	Southern	3,117	
3	Juneau	Southern	1,864	
4	Sitka	Southern	1,396	
5	Wrangell	Southern	868	
6	St. Michael	Northern	857	
7	Douglas	Southern	825	
8	Point Hope	Northern	623	
9	Koggiung	Southern	533	
10	Treadwell	Southern	522	

== 1910 ==
In 1910 census, all incorporated places in the dataset were referred to as "towns". "Villages" and other areas were unincorporated. The territory was also divided into four judicial divisions.

Rank	Incorporated town	Judicial Division	Population	Notes
1	Fairbanks	Fourth	3,541	
2	Nome	Second	2,600	
3	Douglas	First	1,722	
4	Juneau	First	1,644	
5	Ketchikan	First	1,613	
6	Treadwell	First	1,222	
7	Cordova	Third	1,152	
8	Skagway	First	872	
9	Valdez	Third	810	
10	Wrangell	First	743	

== 1920 ==
Rank	Incorporated town	Judicial Division	Population	Notes
1	Juneau	First	3,058	
2	Ketchikan	First	2,458	
3	Sitka	First	1,175	
4	Fairbanks	Fourth	1,155	
5	Cordova	Third	955	
6	Douglas	First	919	
7	Petersburg	First	879	
8	Nome	Second	852	
9	Wrangell	First	821	
10	Seward	Third	652	

== 1930 ==
The 1930 census for Alaska was conducted October 1, 1929.

Rank	Incorporated town	Judicial Division	Population	Notes
1	Juneau	First	4,043	
2	Ketchikan	First	3,796	
3	Anchorage	Third	2,277	Although enumerated separately, Anchorage was classified as "unincorporated" in 1920.
4	Fairbanks	Fourth	2,101	
5	Petersburg	First	1,252	
6	Nome	Second	1,213	
7	Sitka	First	1,056	
8	Cordova	Third	980	
9	Wrangell	First	948	
10	Seward	Third	835	

== 1940 ==
The 1940 census for Alaska was conducted October 1, 1939.

Rank	Incorporated place	Judicial Division	Population	Notes
1	Juneau	First	5,729	
2	Ketchikan	First	4,695	
3	Anchorage	Third	3,495	
4	Fairbanks	Fourth	3,455	
5	Sitka	First	1,987	
6	Nome	Second	1,559	
7	Petersburg	First	1,353	
8	Wrangell	First	1,162	
9	Seward	Third	949	
10	Cordova	Third	938	

== 1950 ==
For the first time since the first census in 1880, all ten incorporated places surpassed 1,000 residents.

Rank	Incorporated place	Judicial Division	Population	Notes
1	Anchorage	Third	11,254	
2	Juneau	First	5,956	
3	Fairbanks	Fourth	5,771	
4	Ketchikan	First	5,305	
5	Seward	Third	2,114	
6	Sitka	First	1,985	
7	Nome	Second	1,876	
8	Kodiak	Third	1,710	
9	Petersburg	First	1,619	
10	Wrangell	First	1,263	

== 1960 ==
The 1960 census was the first census taken since statehood in 1959. Method of divisions changed from four judicial divisions to twenty-four election districts.

Rank	Incorporated place	Election District #	Population	Notes
1	Anchorage	10	44,237	
2	Fairbanks	19	13,311	
3	Juneau	5	6,797	
4	Ketchikan	2	6,483	
5	Sitka	4	3,237	
6	Kodiak	13	2,628	
7	Nome	23	2,316	
8	Seward	11	1,891	
9	Petersburg	3	1,502	
10	Wrangell	3	1,315	

== 1970 ==
The 1970 census saw the method of divisions changed once again from Election Districts to Boroughs and Census Areas.

Rank	Incorporated place	Borough/Census Area	Population	Notes
1	Anchorage	Greater Anchorage Area Borough	48,029	
2	Fairbanks	Fairbanks North Star Borough	14,771	
3	Ketchikan	Ketchikan Gateway Borough	6,994	
4	Juneau	Juneau Borough	6,050	
5	Kodiak	Kodiak Island Borough	3,798	
6	Kenai	Kenai Peninsula Borough	3,533	
7	Sitka	Sitka	3,370	
8	Nome	Nome	2,488	
9	Bethel	Bethel	2,416	
10	Barrow	Barrow	2,104	

== 1980 ==
Rank	Incorporated place	Borough/Census Area	Population	Notes
1	Anchorage	Anchorage Municipality	174,431	City of Anchorage merged with Greater Anchorage Area Borough in 1975 to form the Municipality of Anchorage.
2	Fairbanks	Fairbanks North Star Borough	22,645	
3	Juneau	City & Borough of Juneau	19,528	The City of Juneau and the Borough of Juneau merged in 1970, which includes the former city of Douglas.
4	Sitka	City & Borough of Sitka	7,803	The City of Sitka and Greater Sitka Borough merged in 1971.
5	Ketchikan	Ketchikan Gateway Borough	7,198	
6	Kodiak	Kodiak Island Borough	4,756	
7	Kenai	Kenai Peninsula Borough	4,324	
8	Bethel	Bethel	3,576	
9	Valdez	Valdez-Cordova	3,079	
10	Petersburg	Wrangell-Petersburg	2,821	

== 1990 ==
Rank	Incorporated place	Borough/Census Area	Population	Notes
1	Anchorage	Anchorage Municipality	226,338	
2	Fairbanks	Fairbanks North Star Borough	30,843	
3	Juneau	City & Borough of Juneau	26,751	
4	Sitka	City & Borough of Sitka	8,588	
5	Ketchikan	Ketchikan Gateway Borough	8,283	
6	Kodiak	Kodiak Island Borough	6,365	
7	Kenai	Kenai Peninsula Borough	6,327	
8	Bethel	Bethel	4,674	
9	Valdez	Valdez-Cordova	4,068	
10	Wasilla	Matanuska-Susitna Borough	4,028	

== 2000 ==
Rank	Incorporated place	Borough/Census Area	Population	Notes
1	Anchorage	Anchorage Municipality	260,283	
2	Juneau	City & Borough of Juneau	30,711	
3	Fairbanks	Fairbanks North Star Borough	30,224	
4	Sitka	City & Borough of Sitka	8,835	
5	Ketchikan	Ketchikan Gateway Borough	7,922	
6	Kenai	Kenai Peninsula Borough	6,942	
7	Kodiak	Kodiak Island Borough	6,334	
8	Bethel	Bethel	5,471	
9	Wasilla	Matanuska-Susitna Borough	5,469	
10	Barrow	North Slope Borough	4,581	

== 2010 ==
Rank	Incorporated place	Borough/Census Area	Population	Notes
1	Anchorage	Anchorage Municipality	291,826	
2	Fairbanks	Fairbanks North Star Borough	31,535	
3	Juneau	City & Borough of Juneau	31,275	
4	Sitka	City & Borough of Sitka	8,881	
5	Ketchikan	Ketchikan Gateway Borough	8,050	
6	Wasilla	Matanuska-Susitna Borough	7,831	
7	Kenai	Kenai Peninsula Borough	7,100	
8	Kodiak	Kodiak Island Borough	6,130	
9	Bethel	Bethel	6,080	
10	Palmer	Matanuska-Susitna Borough	5,937	

== 2020 ==
Rank	Incorporated place	Borough/ Census Area	Population	Notes
1	Anchorage	Anchorage Municipality	291,247	
2	Fairbanks	Fairbanks North Star Borough	32,515	
3	Juneau	City & Borough of Juneau	32,255	
4	Wasilla	Matanuska-Susitna Borough	9,054	
5	Sitka	City & Borough of Sitka	8,458	
6	Ketchikan	Ketchikan Gateway Borough	8,192	
7	Kenai	Kenai Peninsula Borough	7,424	
8	Bethel	Bethel	6,325	
9	Palmer	Matanuska-Susitna Borough	5,888	
10	Kodiak	Kodiak Island Borough	5,581	

== See also ==
- Alaska
  - Demographics of Alaska
  - List of cities in Alaska
  - List of census-designated places in Alaska
  - Alaska statistical areas
  - List of Alaska placenames of Native American origin
- List of most populous cities in the United States by decade
