= List of cities in Alaska =

Map of the United States with Alaska highlighted

Alaska municipalities

Alaska is a state of the United States in the northwest extremity of the North American continent. According to the 2020 United States Census, Alaska is the 3rd least populous state with 733,391 inhabitants but is the largest by land area spanning 570,640.95 square miles (1,477,953.3 km^{2}). Alaska is divided administratively into 19 organized boroughs and one Unorganized Borough (which is divided into 11 non-administrative census areas) and contains 149 incorporated cities: four unified home rule municipalities, which are considered both boroughs and cities; ten home rule cities; nineteen first class cities; and 116 second class cities. Alaska's incorporated cities cover only 2.1% of the territory's land mass but are home to 69.92% of its population. The majority of the incorporated land mass consists of the four unified municipalities, each over 1,700 square miles (4,400 km^{2}) in size. Only two other cities have an incorporated area exceeding 100 square miles (260 km^{2}): Unalaska, which includes the fishing port of Dutch Harbor, and Valdez, which includes the terminus of the Trans-Alaska Pipeline System.

Incorporated cities in Alaska are categorized as either "general law" (subdivided into "first class" and "second class") or "home rule". In general, the powers and functions of general law cities and home rule cities are substantially the same, with all legislative powers not prohibited by law or charter. Apart from duties such as conducting elections and holding regular meetings of the governing bodies, the duties of local cities vary considerably and are determined at the local level. Home rule cities and first class cities in the unorganized borough must operate municipal school districts, exercise planning, and land use regulations while organized boroughs take on these responsibilities unless delegated to the city by the borough. Unified home rule cities (and other boroughs) also have the duty to collect municipal property and sales tax for use in their jurisdiction. Home rule cities occur when a community establishes a commission to draft a charter, which is then ratified by voters at an election. Title 29 of the Alaska Statutes, which covers municipal government, requires that a community must have at least 400 permanent residents to incorporate as a home rule or first class city. This status does not diminish if a city's population declines; one home rule city (Nenana) and four first class cities (Hydaburg, Pelican, Seldovia and Tanana) reported populations falling below that threshold in the 2010 Census.

The largest municipality by population in Alaska is Anchorage with 291,247 residents or approximately 39.7% of the state population. The smallest municipality by population is Kupreanof with 21 residents. The largest municipality by land area is Sitka which spans 2,870.34 mi^{2} (7,434.1 km^{2}), while Kiana is the smallest at 0.19 mi^{2} (0.49 km^{2}). The first city to incorporate was Ketchikan in 1901 and the newest municipality is Whale Pass which incorporated in 2017.

== Incorporated cities ==
Most populous cities in Alaska

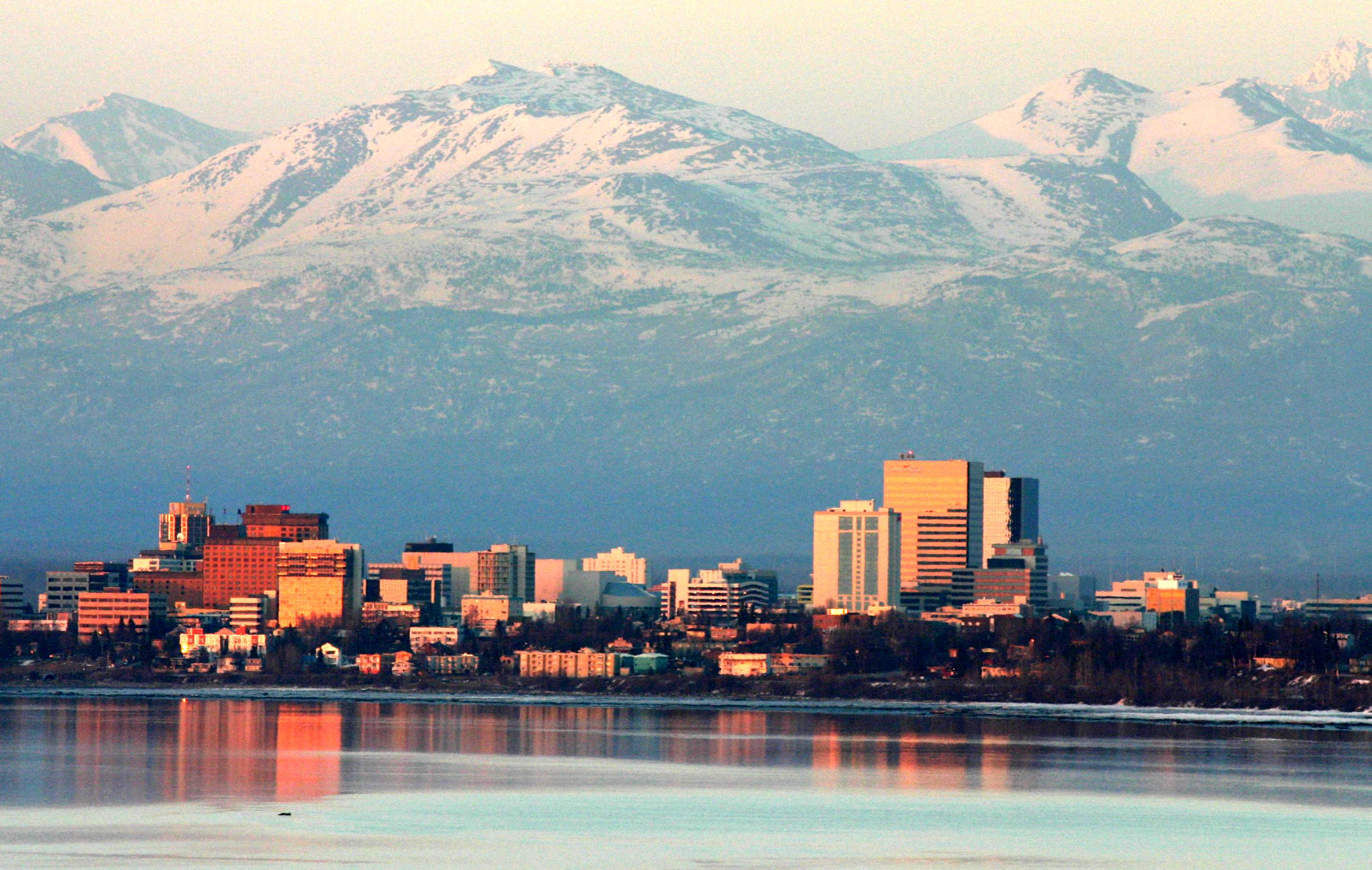
Skyline of Anchorage, Alaska's most populous city

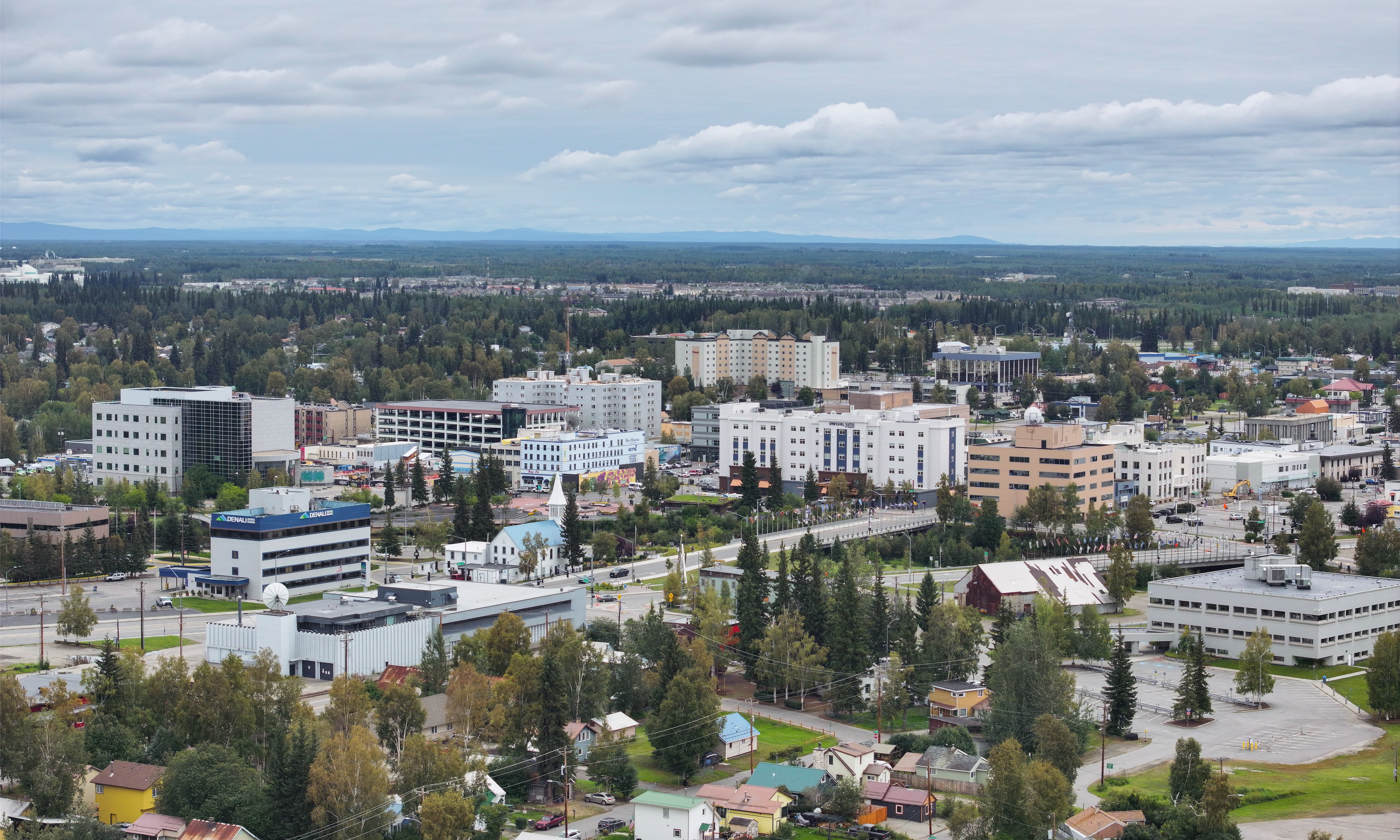
Downtown Fairbanks, the second most populous city in Alaska

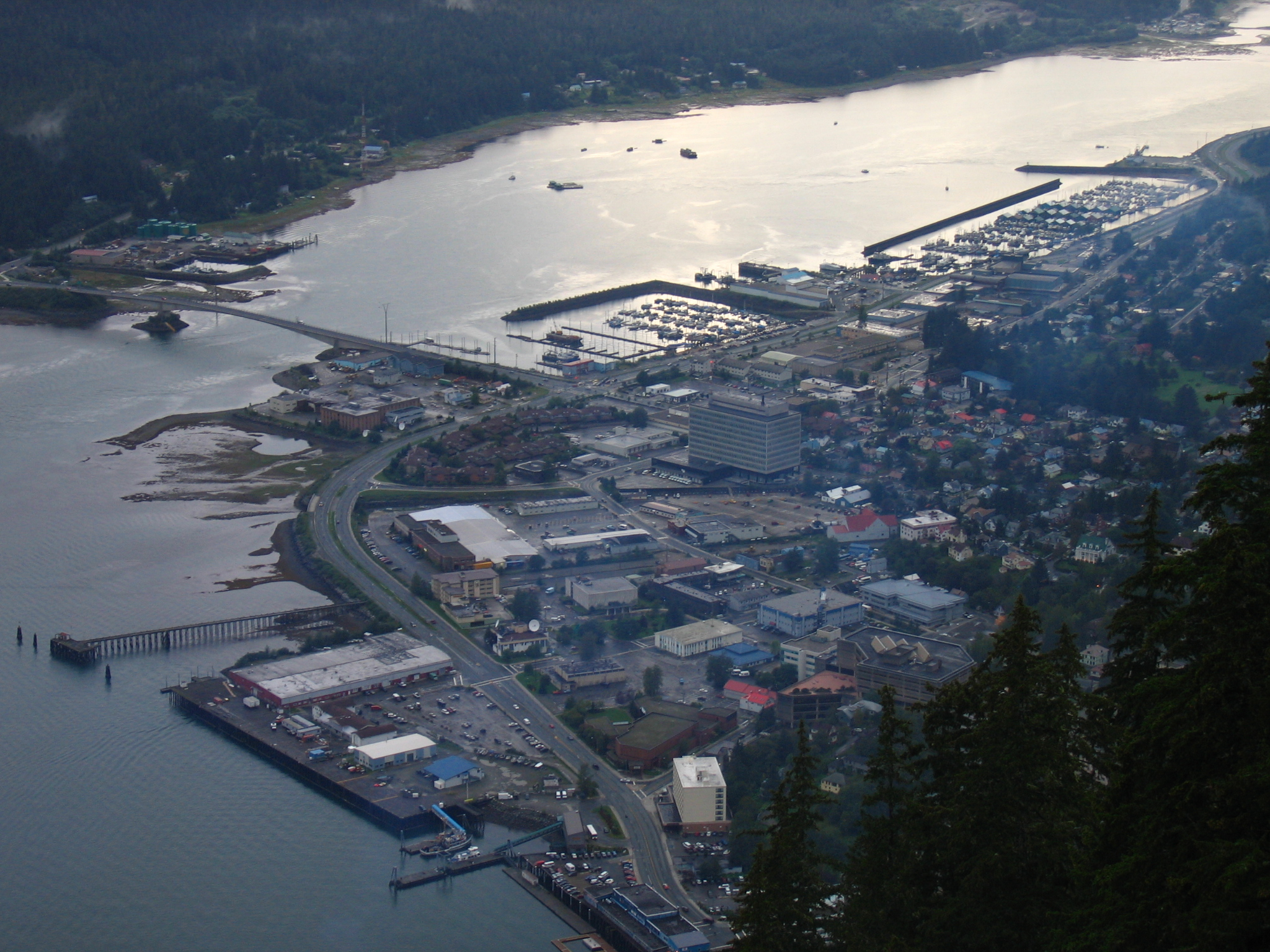
Aerial view of Juneau, Alaska's capital and third most populous city

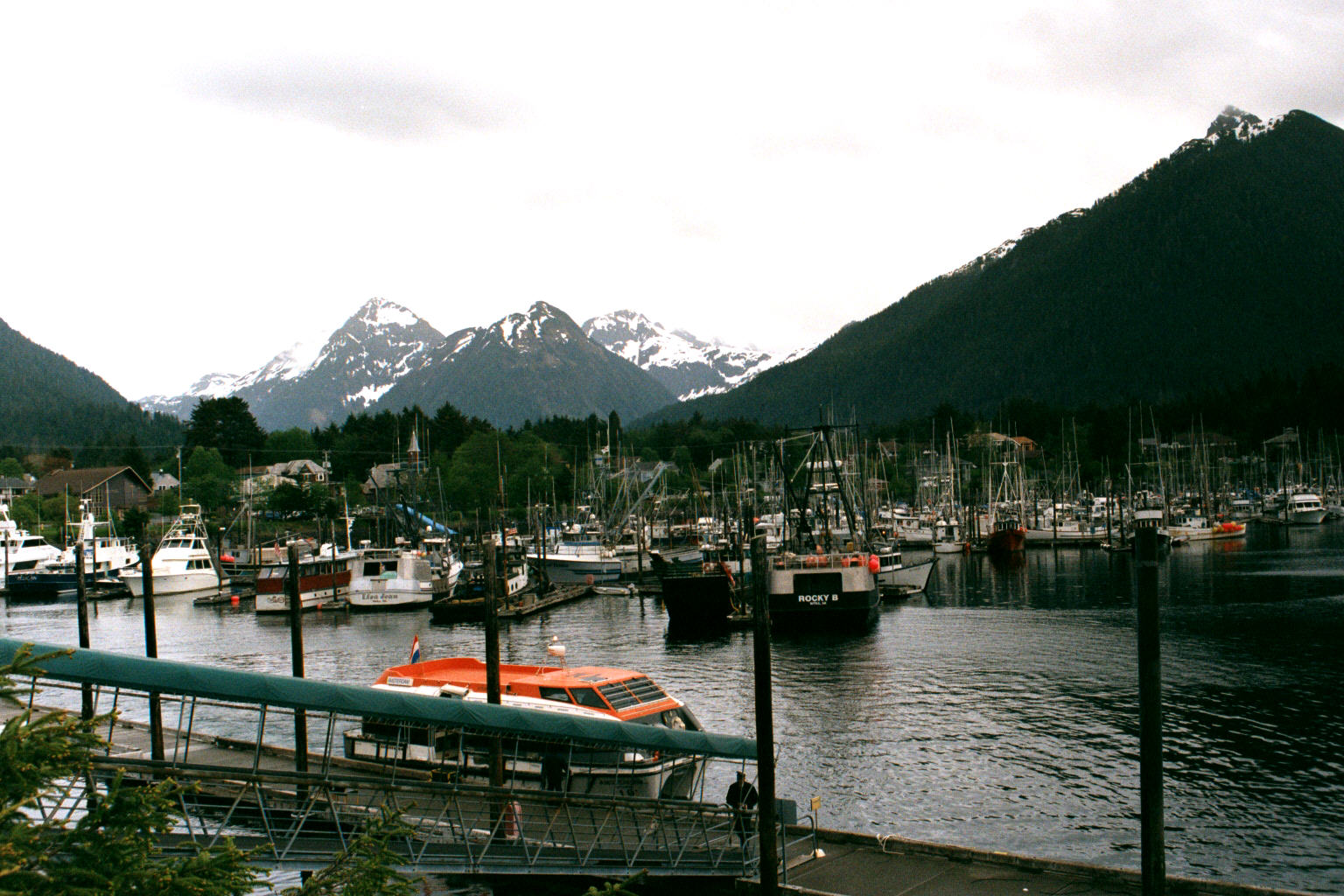
Harbor of Sitka, the fifth most populous city in Alaska and largest by land area

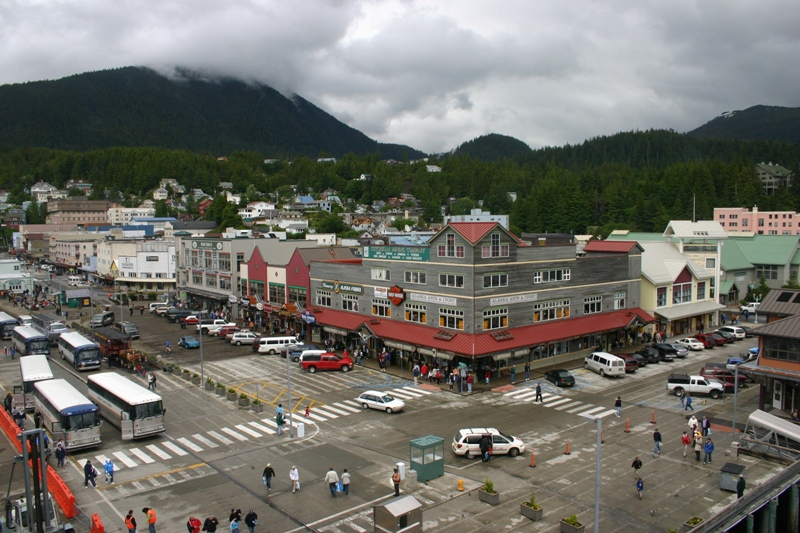
Downtown Ketchikan, the earliest extant incorporated city and sixth most populous city in Alaska

‡ State capital

† Borough seat

Cities in Alaska
Name	Class	Borough or Census Area	Incorporated	Population (2020)	Population (2010)	Change	Land area (2020)		Population density
Name	Class	Borough or Census Area	Incorporated	Population (2020)	Population (2010)	Change	sq mi	km^{2}	Population density
Adak	Second Class	Aleutians West (CA)	2001	171	326	−47.5%	32.43	84.0	5.3/sq mi (2.0/km^{2})
Akhiok	Second Class	Kodiak Island	1974	63	71	−11.3%	7.40	19.2	8.5/sq mi (3.3/km^{2})
Akiak	Second Class	Bethel (CA)	1970	462	346	+33.5%	1.89	4.9	244.4/sq mi (94.4/km^{2})
Akutan	Second Class	Aleutians East	1979	1,589	1,027	+54.7%	65.98	170.9	24.1/sq mi (9.3/km^{2})
Alakanuk	Second Class	Kusilvak (CA)	1969	756	677	+11.7%	32.20	83.4	23.5/sq mi (9.1/km^{2})
Aleknagik	Second Class	Dillingham (CA)	1973	211	219	−3.7%	26.55	68.8	7.9/sq mi (3.1/km^{2})
Allakaket	Second Class	Yukon-Koyukuk (CA)	1975	177	105	+68.6%	14.72	38.1	12.0/sq mi (4.6/km^{2})
Ambler	Second Class	Northwest Arctic	1971	274	258	+6.2%	10.28	26.6	26.7/sq mi (10.3/km^{2})
Anaktuvuk Pass	Second Class	North Slope	1959	425	324	+31.2%	5.18	13.4	82.0/sq mi (31.7/km^{2})
Anchorage	Unified Home Rule	Anchorage	1975	291,247	291,826	−0.2%	1,706.80	4,420.6	170.6/sq mi (65.9/km^{2})
Anderson	Second Class	Denali (Note: The Borough seat is Healy, a census-designated place.)	1962	177	246	−28.0%	42.20	109.3	4.2/sq mi (1.6/km^{2})
Angoon	Second Class	Hoonah-Angoon (CA)	1963	357	459	−22.2%	24.53	63.5	14.6/sq mi (5.6/km^{2})
Aniak	Second Class	Bethel (CA)	1972	507	501	+1.2%	6.18	16.0	82.0/sq mi (31.7/km^{2})
Anvik	Second Class	Yukon-Koyukuk (CA)	1969	70	85	−17.6%	9.49	24.6	7.4/sq mi (2.8/km^{2})
Atka	Second Class	Aleutians West (CA)	1988	53	61	−13.1%	8.47	21.9	6.3/sq mi (2.4/km^{2})
Atqasuk	Second Class	North Slope	1982	276	233	+18.5%	39.12	101.3	7.1/sq mi (2.7/km^{2})
Bethel	Second Class	Bethel (CA)	1957	6,325	6,080	+4.0%	44.51	115.3	142.1/sq mi (54.9/km^{2})
Bettles	Second Class	Yukon-Koyukuk (CA)	1985	23	12	+91.7%	1.56	4.0	14.7/sq mi (5.7/km^{2})
Brevig Mission	Second Class	Nome (CA)	1969	428	388	+10.3%	2.43	6.3	176.1/sq mi (68.0/km^{2})
Buckland	Second Class	Northwest Arctic	1966	550	416	+32.2%	0.85	2.2	647.1/sq mi (249.8/km^{2})
Chefornak	Second Class	Bethel (CA)	1974	506	418	+21.1%	5.24	13.6	96.6/sq mi (37.3/km^{2})
Chevak	Second Class	Kusilvak (CA)	1967	951	938	+1.4%	1.14	3.0	834.2/sq mi (322.1/km^{2})
Chignik	Second Class	Lake and Peninsula	1983	97	91	+6.6%	10.95	28.4	8.9/sq mi (3.4/km^{2})
Chuathbaluk	Second Class	Bethel (CA)	1975	104	118	−11.9%	4.47	11.6	23.3/sq mi (9.0/km^{2})
Clark's Point	Second Class	Dillingham (CA)	1971	67	62	+8.1%	3.32	8.6	20.2/sq mi (7.8/km^{2})
Coffman Cove	Second Class	Prince of Wales-Hyder (CA)	1989	127	176	−27.8%	10.90	28.2	11.7/sq mi (4.5/km^{2})
Cold Bay	Second Class	Aleutians East	1981	50	108	−53.7%	53.41	138.3	0.9/sq mi (0.4/km^{2})
Cordova	Home Rule	Chugach (CA)	1909	2,609	2,239	+16.5%	61.35	158.9	42.5/sq mi (16.4/km^{2})
Craig	First Class	Prince of Wales-Hyder (CA)	1922	1,036	1,201	−13.7%	6.69	17.3	154.9/sq mi (59.8/km^{2})
Deering	Second Class	Northwest Arctic	1970	182	122	+49.2%	5.02	13.0	36.3/sq mi (14.0/km^{2})
Delta Junction	Second Class	Southeast Fairbanks (CA)	1960	918	958	−4.2%	13.88	35.9	66.1/sq mi (25.5/km^{2})
Dillingham	First Class	Dillingham (CA)	1963	2,249	2,329	−3.4%	33.34	86.4	67.5/sq mi (26.0/km^{2})
Diomede	Second Class	Nome (CA)	1970	83	115	−27.8%	2.43	6.3	34.2/sq mi (13.2/km^{2})
Eagle	Second Class	Southeast Fairbanks (CA)	1901	83	86	−3.5%	0.88	2.3	94.3/sq mi (36.4/km^{2})
Edna Bay (Note: Edna Bay incorporated in October 2014 and thus not included in the sums for the 2010)	Second Class	Prince of Wales-Hyder (CA)	2014	25	—	—	21.14	54.8	1.2/sq mi (0.5/km^{2})
Eek	Second Class	Bethel (CA)	1970	404	296	+36.5%	0.65	1.7	621.5/sq mi (240.0/km^{2})
Egegik	Second Class	Lake and Peninsula	1995	39	109	−64.2%	29.55	76.5	1.3/sq mi (0.5/km^{2})
Ekwok	Second Class	Dillingham (CA)	1974	111	115	−3.5%	16.75	43.4	6.6/sq mi (2.6/km^{2})
Elim	Second Class	Nome (CA)	1970	366	330	+10.9%	2.66	6.9	137.6/sq mi (53.1/km^{2})
Emmonak	Second Class	Kusilvak (CA)	1964	825	762	+8.3%	4.97	12.9	166.0/sq mi (64.1/km^{2})
Fairbanks†	Home Rule	Fairbanks North Star	1903	32,515	31,535	+3.1%	31.75	82.2	1,024.1/sq mi (395.4/km^{2})
False Pass	Second Class	Aleutians East	1990	397	35	+1,034.3%	25.07	64.9	15.8/sq mi (6.1/km^{2})
Fort Yukon	Second Class	Yukon-Koyukuk (CA)	1959	428	583	−26.6%	6.74	17.5	63.5/sq mi (24.5/km^{2})
Galena	First Class	Yukon-Koyukuk (CA)	1971	472	470	+0.4%	17.65	45.7	26.7/sq mi (10.3/km^{2})
Gambell	Second Class	Nome (CA)	1963	640	681	−6.0%	10.51	27.2	60.9/sq mi (23.5/km^{2})
Golovin	Second Class	Nome (CA)	1971	175	156	+12.2%	4.13	10.7	42.4/sq mi (16.4/km^{2})
Goodnews Bay	Second Class	Bethel (CA)	1970	258	243	+6.2%	3.33	8.6	77.5/sq mi (29.9/km^{2})
Grayling	Second Class	Yukon-Koyukuk (CA)	1969	210	194	+8.2%	11.23	29.1	18.7/sq mi (7.2/km^{2})
Gustavus	Second Class	Hoonah-Angoon (CA)	2004	655	442	+48.2%	36.36	94.2	18.0/sq mi (7.0/km^{2})
Holy Cross	Second Class	Yukon-Koyukuk (CA)	1968	176	178	−1.1%	28.83	74.7	6.1/sq mi (2.4/km^{2})
Homer	First Class	Kenai Peninsula	1964	5,522	5,003	+10.4%	13.79	35.7	400.4/sq mi (154.6/km^{2})
Hoonah	First Class	Hoonah-Angoon (CA)	1946	931	760	+22.5%	5.87	15.2	158.6/sq mi (61.2/km^{2})
Hooper Bay	Second Class	Kusilvak (CA)	1966	1,375	1,093	+25.8%	7.50	19.4	183.3/sq mi (70.8/km^{2})
Houston	Second Class	Matanuska-Susitna	1966	1,975	1,912	+3.3%	23.94	62.0	82.5/sq mi (31.9/km^{2})
Hughes	Second Class	Yukon-Koyukuk (CA)	1973	85	77	+10.4%	3.04	7.9	28.0/sq mi (10.8/km^{2})
Huslia	Second Class	Yukon-Koyukuk (CA)	1969	304	275	+10.5%	15.79	40.9	19.3/sq mi (7.4/km^{2})
Hydaburg	First Class	Prince of Wales-Hyder (CA)	1927	380	376	+1.1%	0.29	0.75	1,310.3/sq mi (505.9/km^{2})
Juneau‡	Unified Home Rule	Juneau	1970	32,255	31,275	+3.1%	2,704.03	7,003.4	11.9/sq mi (4.6/km^{2})
Kachemak	Second Class	Kenai Peninsula	1961	576	472	+22.0%	1.67	4.3	344.9/sq mi (133.2/km^{2})
Kake	First Class	Prince of Wales-Hyder (CA)	1952	543	557	−2.5%	7.67	19.9	70.8/sq mi (27.3/km^{2})
Kaktovik	Second Class	North Slope	1971	283	239	+18.4%	0.77	2.0	367.5/sq mi (141.9/km^{2})
Kaltag	Second Class	Yukon-Koyukuk (CA)	1969	158	190	−16.8%	21.64	56.0	7.3/sq mi (2.8/km^{2})
Kasaan	Second Class	Prince of Wales-Hyder (CA)	1976	30	49	−38.8%	6.06	15.7	5.0/sq mi (1.9/km^{2})
Kenai	Home Rule	Kenai Peninsula	1960	7,424	7,100	+4.6%	29.14	75.5	254.8/sq mi (98.4/km^{2})
Ketchikan†	Home Rule	Ketchikan Gateway	1900	8,192	8,050	+1.8%	3.81	9.9	2,150.1/sq mi (830.2/km^{2})
Kiana	Second Class	Northwest Arctic	1964	447	361	+23.8%	0.19	0.49	2,352.6/sq mi (908.4/km^{2})
King Cove	First Class	Aleutians East	1947	757	938	−19.3%	24.66	63.9	30.7/sq mi (11.9/km^{2})
Kivalina	Second Class	Northwest Arctic	1969	444	374	+18.7%	1.63	4.2	272.4/sq mi (105.2/km^{2})
Klawock	First Class	Prince of Wales-Hyder (CA)	1929	720	755	−4.6%	0.68	1.8	1,058.8/sq mi (408.8/km^{2})
Kobuk	Second Class	Northwest Arctic	1973	191	151	+26.5%	15.51	40.2	12.3/sq mi (4.8/km^{2})
Kodiak†	Home Rule	Kodiak Island	1940	5,581	6,130	−9.0%	3.92	10.2	1,423.7/sq mi (549.7/km^{2})
Kotlik	Second Class	Kusilvak (CA)	1970	655	577	+13.5%	2.99	7.7	219.1/sq mi (84.6/km^{2})
Kotzebue†	Second Class	Northwest Arctic	1958	3,102	3,201	−3.1%	24.76	64.1	125.3/sq mi (48.4/km^{2})
Koyuk	Second Class	Nome (CA)	1970	312	332	−6.0%	5.10	13.2	61.2/sq mi (23.6/km^{2})
Koyukuk	Second Class	Yukon-Koyukuk (CA)	1973	98	96	+2.1%	5.74	14.9	17.1/sq mi (6.6/km^{2})
Kupreanof	Second Class	Petersburg	1975	21	27	−22.2%	3.02	7.8	7.0/sq mi (2.7/km^{2})
Kwethluk	Second Class	Bethel (CA)	1975	812	721	+12.6%	10.18	26.4	79.8/sq mi (30.8/km^{2})
Larsen Bay	Second Class	Kodiak Island	1974	34	87	−60.9%	4.03	10.4	8.4/sq mi (3.3/km^{2})
Lower Kalskag	Second Class	Bethel (CA)	1969	278	282	−1.4%	1.24	3.2	224.2/sq mi (86.6/km^{2})
Manokotak	Second Class	Dillingham (CA)	1970	488	442	+10.4%	73.14	189.4	6.7/sq mi (2.6/km^{2})
Marshall	Second Class	Kusilvak (CA)	1970	492	414	+18.8%	4.06	10.5	121.2/sq mi (46.8/km^{2})
McGrath	Second Class	Yukon-Koyukuk (CA)	1975	301	346	−13.0%	42.33	109.6	7.1/sq mi (2.7/km^{2})
Mekoryuk	Second Class	Bethel (CA)	1969	206	191	+7.9%	7.07	18.3	29.1/sq mi (11.2/km^{2})
Mountain Village	Second Class	Kusilvak (CA)	1967	621	813	−23.6%	4.21	10.9	147.5/sq mi (57.0/km^{2})
Napakiak	Second Class	Bethel (CA)	1970	358	354	+1.1%	2.01	5.2	178.1/sq mi (68.8/km^{2})
Napaskiak	Second Class	Bethel (CA)	1971	509	405	+25.7%	2.90	7.5	175.5/sq mi (67.8/km^{2})
Nenana	Home Rule	Yukon-Koyukuk (CA)	1921	358	378	−5.3%	5.95	15.4	60.2/sq mi (23.2/km^{2})
New Stuyahok	Second Class	Dillingham (CA)	1972	512	510	+0.4%	33.72	87.3	15.2/sq mi (5.9/km^{2})
Newhalen	Second Class	Lake and Peninsula (Note: The Borough seat is King Salmon, a census-designated place, and is located in neighboring Bristol Bay Borough.)	1971	168	190	−11.6%	6.03	15.6	27.9/sq mi (10.8/km^{2})
Nightmute	Second Class	Bethel (CA)	1974	306	280	+9.3%	98.96	256.3	3.1/sq mi (1.2/km^{2})
Nikolai	Second Class	Yukon-Koyukuk (CA)	1970	89	94	−5.3%	4.39	11.4	20.3/sq mi (7.8/km^{2})
Nome	First Class	Nome (CA)	1901	3,699	3,598	+2.8%	12.80	33.2	289.0/sq mi (111.6/km^{2})
Nondalton	Second Class	Lake and Peninsula	1971	133	164	−18.9%	6.74	17.5	19.7/sq mi (7.6/km^{2})
Noorvik	Second Class	Northwest Arctic	1964	694	668	+3.9%	0.84	2.2	826.2/sq mi (319.0/km^{2})
North Pole	Home Rule	Fairbanks North Star	1953	2,243	2,117	+6.0%	4.08	10.6	549.8/sq mi (212.3/km^{2})
Nuiqsut	Second Class	North Slope	1975	512	402	+27.4%	8.89	23.0	57.6/sq mi (22.2/km^{2})
Nulato	Second Class	Yukon-Koyukuk (CA)	1963	238	264	−9.8%	41.09	106.4	5.8/sq mi (2.2/km^{2})
Nunam Iqua	Second Class	Kusilvak (CA)	1974	217	187	+16.0%	11.57	30.0	18.8/sq mi (7.2/km^{2})
Nunapitchuk	Second Class	Bethel (CA)	1969	594	496	+19.8%	6.99	18.1	85.0/sq mi (32.8/km^{2})
Old Harbor	Second Class	Kodiak Island	1966	216	218	−0.9%	16.19	41.9	13.3/sq mi (5.2/km^{2})
Ouzinkie	Second Class	Kodiak Island	1967	109	161	−32.3%	5.54	14.3	19.7/sq mi (7.6/km^{2})
Palmer†	Home Rule	Matanuska-Susitna	1951	5,888	5,937	−0.8%	5.07	13.1	1,161.3/sq mi (448.4/km^{2})
Pelican	First Class	Hoonah-Angoon (CA)	1943	98	88	+11.4%	0.55	1.4	178.2/sq mi (68.8/km^{2})
Pilot Point	Second Class	Lake and Peninsula	1992	70	68	+2.9%	24.55	63.6	2.9/sq mi (1.1/km^{2})
Pilot Station	Second Class	Kusilvak (CA)	1969	615	568	+8.3%	1.61	4.2	382.0/sq mi (147.5/km^{2})
Platinum	Second Class	Bethel (CA)	1975	55	61	−9.8%	47.27	122.4	1.2/sq mi (0.4/km^{2})
Point Hope	Second Class	North Slope	1966	830	674	+23.1%	5.00	12.9	166.0/sq mi (64.1/km^{2})
Port Alexander	Second Class	Prince of Wales-Hyder (CA)	1974	78	52	+50.0%	3.50	9.1	22.3/sq mi (8.6/km^{2})
Port Heiden	Second Class	Lake and Peninsula	1972	100	102	−2.0%	46.77	121.1	2.1/sq mi (0.8/km^{2})
Port Lions	Second Class	Kodiak Island	1966	170	194	−12.4%	4.99	12.9	34.1/sq mi (13.2/km^{2})
Quinhagak	Second Class	Bethel (CA)	1975	776	669	+16.0%	4.10	10.6	189.3/sq mi (73.1/km^{2})
Ruby	Second Class	Yukon-Koyukuk (CA)	1973	139	166	−16.3%	7.03	18.2	19.8/sq mi (7.6/km^{2})
Russian Mission	Second Class	Kusilvak (CA)	1970	421	312	+34.9%	5.37	13.9	78.4/sq mi (30.3/km^{2})
Saint Paul	Second Class	Aleutians West (CA)	1971	413	479	−13.8%	42.62	110.4	9.7/sq mi (3.7/km^{2})
Sand Point†	First Class	Aleutians East	1966	578	976	−40.8%	8.01	20.7	72.2/sq mi (27.9/km^{2})
Savoonga	Second Class	Nome (CA)	1969	835	671	+24.4%	5.87	15.2	142.2/sq mi (54.9/km^{2})
Saxman	Second Class	Ketchikan Gateway	1929	384	411	−6.6%	0.96	2.5	400.0/sq mi (154.4/km^{2})
Scammon Bay	Second Class	Kusilvak (CA)	1967	600	474	+26.6%	0.47	1.2	1,276.6/sq mi (492.9/km^{2})
Selawik	Second Class	Northwest Arctic	1977 (Note: A conflict as to the date exists between sources: 1996 Alaska Municipal Officials Directory (p. 136) gives 1977, while "Directory of Borough and City Officials 1974" (p. 72) gives December 23, 1963. It is unclear whether Selawik may have dissolved and later reincorporated its city government.)	809	829	−2.4%	2.33	6.0	347.2/sq mi (134.1/km^{2})
Seldovia	First Class	Kenai Peninsula	1945	235	255	−7.8%	0.39	1.0	602.6/sq mi (232.7/km^{2})
Seward	Home Rule	Kenai Peninsula	1912	2,717	2,693	+0.9%	13.96	36.2	194.6/sq mi (75.1/km^{2})
Shageluk	Second Class	Yukon-Koyukuk (CA)	1970	100	83	+20.5%	10.22	26.5	9.8/sq mi (3.8/km^{2})
Shaktoolik	Second Class	Nome (CA)	1969	212	251	−15.5%	1.07	2.8	198.1/sq mi (76.5/km^{2})
Shishmaref	Second Class	Nome (CA)	1969	576	563	+2.3%	2.34	6.1	246.2/sq mi (95.0/km^{2})
Shungnak	Second Class	Northwest Arctic	1967	272	262	+3.8%	8.05	20.8	33.8/sq mi (13.0/km^{2})
Sitka	Unified Home Rule	Sitka	1971	8,458	8,881	−4.8%	2,870.06	7,433.4	2.9/sq mi (1.1/km^{2})
Soldotna†	Home Rule	Kenai Peninsula	1967	4,342	4,163	+4.3%	6.96	18.0	623.9/sq mi (240.9/km^{2})
St. George	Second Class	Aleutians West (CA)	1983	67	102	−34.3%	34.78	90.1	1.9/sq mi (0.7/km^{2})
St. Mary's	First Class	Kusilvak (CA)	1967	599	507	+18.1%	44.60	115.5	13.4/sq mi (5.2/km^{2})
St. Michael	Second Class	Nome (CA)	1969	456	401	+13.7%	21.75	56.3	21.0/sq mi (8.1/km^{2})
Stebbins	Second Class	Nome (CA)	1969	634	556	+14.0%	32.61	84.5	19.4/sq mi (7.5/km^{2})
Tanana	First Class	Yukon-Koyukuk (CA)	1961	246	246	0.0%	10.67	27.6	23.1/sq mi (8.9/km^{2})
Teller	Second Class	Nome (CA)	1963	249	229	+8.7%	1.49	3.9	167.1/sq mi (64.5/km^{2})
Tenakee Springs	Second Class	Hoonah-Angoon (CA)	1971	116	131	−11.5%	13.15	34.1	8.8/sq mi (3.4/km^{2})
Thorne Bay	Second Class	Prince of Wales-Hyder (CA)	1982	476	471	+1.1%	26.67	69.1	17.8/sq mi (6.9/km^{2})
Togiak	Second Class	Dillingham (CA)	1969	817	817	0.0%	42.01	108.8	19.4/sq mi (7.5/km^{2})
Toksook Bay	Second Class	Bethel (CA)	1972	658	590	+11.5%	28.71	74.4	22.9/sq mi (8.8/km^{2})
Unalakleet	Second Class	Nome (CA)	1974	765	688	+11.2%	2.86	7.4	267.5/sq mi (103.3/km^{2})
Unalaska	First Class	Aleutians West (CA)	1942	4,254	4,376	−2.8%	102.21	264.7	41.6/sq mi (16.1/km^{2})
Upper Kalskag	Second Class	Bethel (CA)	1975	212	210	+1.0%	3.56	9.2	59.6/sq mi (23.0/km^{2})
Utqiaġvik† (Note: Formerly known as Barrow, the name was changed in 2016 as part of an ongoing effort to promote the use of the Iñupiaq language.)	First Class	North Slope	1959	4,927	4,212	+17.0%	18.77	48.6	262.5/sq mi (101.3/km^{2})
Valdez	Home Rule	Chugach (CA)	1901	3,985	3,976	+0.2%	212.69	550.9	18.7/sq mi (7.2/km^{2})
Wainwright	Second Class	North Slope	1962	628	556	+12.9%	10.31	26.7	60.9/sq mi (23.5/km^{2})
Wales	Second Class	Nome (CA)	1964	168	145	+15.9%	2.30	6.0	73.0/sq mi (28.2/km^{2})
Wasilla	First Class	Matanuska-Susitna	1974	9,054	7,831	+15.6%	12.40	32.1	730.2/sq mi (281.9/km^{2})
Whale Pass (Note: Whale Pass incorporated in 2017 and thus not included in the sums for the 2010.)	Second Class	Prince of Wales-Hyder (CA)	2017	86	—	—	19.86	51.4	4.3/sq mi (1.7/km^{2})
White Mountain	Second Class	Nome (CA)	1969	185	190	−2.6%	1.82	4.7	101.6/sq mi (39.2/km^{2})
Whittier	Second Class	Chugach (CA)	1969	272	220	+23.6%	12.25	31.7	22.2/sq mi (8.6/km^{2})
Wrangell	Unified Home Rule	Wrangell	2008	2,127	2,369	−10.2%	2,555.99	6,620.0	0.8/sq mi (0.3/km^{2})
Total cities (Note: The totals reflect the 2010 Census numbers and thus include Petersburg, with a population of 2948 and a land area of 44.13 square miles (114.3 km^{2}), which dissolved its city government in 2013 in favor of incorporating as a borough.)	–	–	–	497,374	457,229	+8.8%	12,182.77	31,553.2	40.8/sq mi (15.8/km^{2})
Alaska	–	–	–	733,391	710,231	+3.3%	570,640.95	1,477,953.3	1.3/sq mi (0.5/km^{2})

== See also ==
- List of census-designated places in Alaska
- List of boroughs and census areas in Alaska
- List of most populous cities in Alaska by decade
