= Allen Army Airfield =

Allen Army Airfield (former Big Delta Army Airfield)
- IATA: BIG; ICAO: PABI; FAA LID: BIG

Summary
- Airport type: Public / Military
- Owner: United States Army
- Serves: Fort Greely, Alaska
- Location: Delta Junction, Alaska
- Built: 1942
- Elevation AMSL: 1,291 ft (393 m)
- Coordinates: 63°59′43″N 145°43′12″W

Map
- Location of airport in Alaska

Runways
Direction	Length		Surface
Direction	ft	m	Surface
1/19	9,000	2,743	Asphalt
10/28	6,115	1,864	Asphalt
7/25	4,057	1,237	Asphalt
- Source: Federal Aviation Administration

Allen Army Airfield (IATA: BIG, ICAO: PABI, FAA LID: BIG) is a public and military use airport serving Fort Greely and located three miles (5 km) south of the central business district of Delta Junction, a city in the Southeast Fairbanks Census Area of the U.S. state of Alaska. It is owned by the United States Army, which has an agreement with the City of Delta Junction for joint use of the airfield by both military and civilian aircraft.

== History ==
Established in 1942 as Big Delta Army Airfield, it was named for river delta formed by the confluence of the Delta River and the Tanana River. It was later renamed Allen Army Airfield. Fort Greely was built south of the airfield after World War II.

== Facilities and aircraft ==
Allen Army Airfield resides at elevation of 1,285 feet (392 m) above mean sea level. It has three asphalt paved runways: 1/19 is 9,000 by 150 feet (2,743 x 46 m); 10/28 is 6,115 by 150 feet (1,864 x 46 m); 7/25 is 4,057 by 90 feet (1,243 x 27 m).

Two runways are lighted and can accommodate heavy cargo aircraft year-round, including the C-17. Between December and April the runways can accommodate any aircraft, including the C-5A. A 37,600-square-foot (3,490 m^{2}) hangar accommodates military aircraft as large as the CH-47. Approximately 920,000 square feet (85,000 m^{2}) of airport ramp space is available. For the 12-month period ending January 3, 1984, the airport had 29,200 aircraft operations, an average of 80 per day: 91% military and 9% general aviation.

== See also ==
- Alaska World War II Army Airfields
- Air Transport Command
- Northwest Staging Route
