= Atchuelinguk River =

- Location of the mouth of the Atchuelinguk River in Alaska
- Native name: Ecuilnguq (Central Yupik)

Location
- Country: United States
- State: Alaska
- Census Area: Kusilvak

Physical characteristics
- Source: Nulato Hills
  - location: Yukon Delta National Wildlife Refuge
  - coordinates: 63°02′38″N 161°26′38″W
  - elevation: 2,006 ft (611 m)
- Mouth: Yukon River
  - location: 25 miles (40 km) west of Marshall
  - coordinates: 61°57′30″N 162°49′38″W
  - elevation: 0 ft (0 m)
- Length: 266 km (165 mi)
- Basin size: 4,201.6 km^{2} (1,622.2 mi^{2})
- Discharge
  - location: Pilot Station (near mouth)
  - average: 73.807 m^{3}/s (2,606.5 cu ft/s)

The Atchuelinguk River (Yup'ik Ecuilnguq, literally "clear water") Atchuelinguk is a 165-mile (266 km) tributary of the Yukon River in the U.S. state of Alaska. It flows southwest from the Nulato Hills through the Yukon Delta National Wildlife Refuge to meet the larger river near Pilot Station.

== See also ==
- List of rivers of Alaska
