= Birch Creek (Yukon River tributary) =

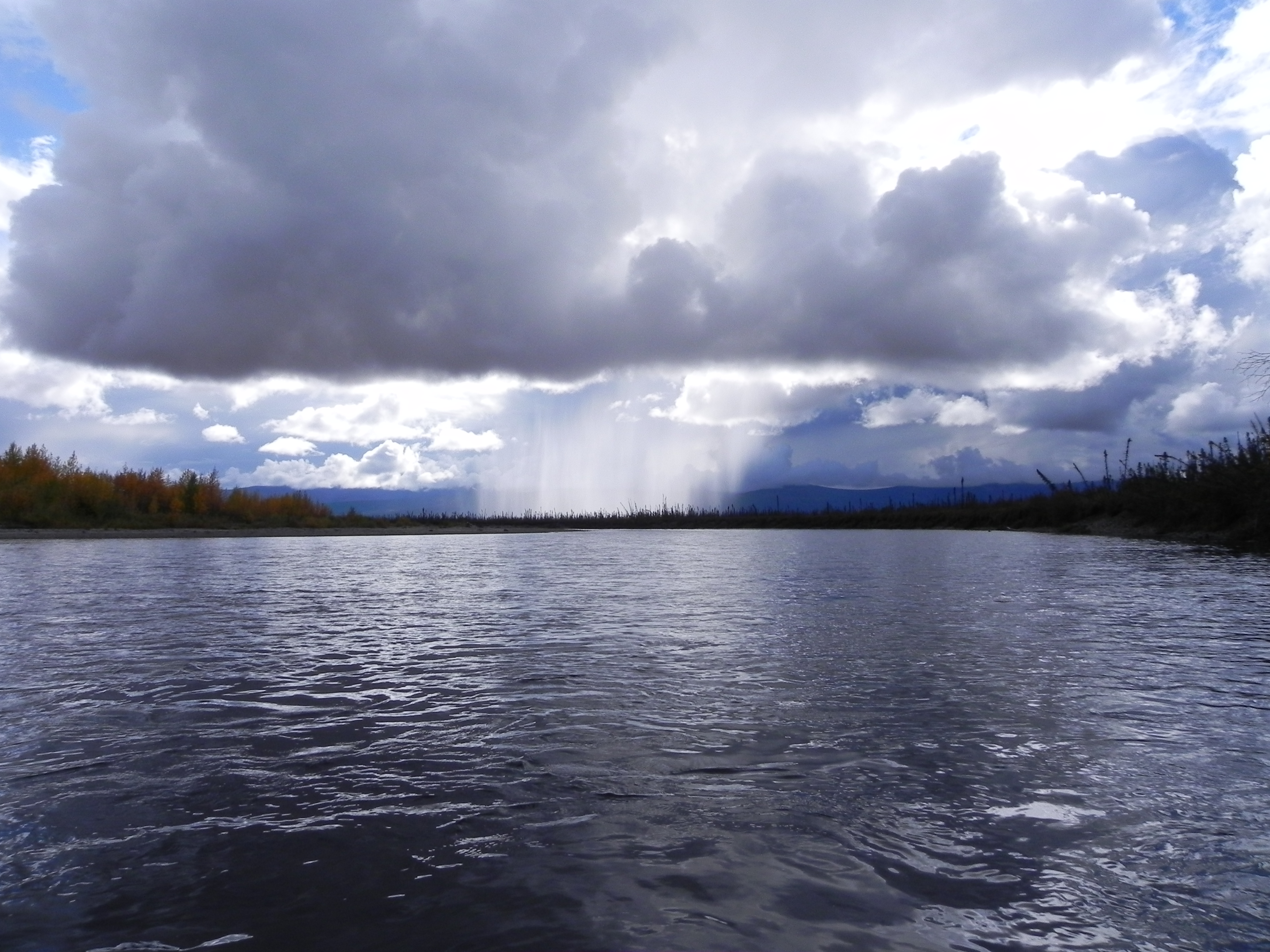
- Rain along Birch Creek

- Location of the mouth of Birch Creek in Alaska

Location
- Country: United States
- State: Alaska
- Census Area: Yukon–Koyukuk

Physical characteristics
- Source: confluence of Ptarmigan and Eagle creeks
  - location: near Porcupine Dome
  - coordinates: 65°26′19″N 145°31′36″W
  - elevation: 2,275 ft (693 m)
- Mouth: beginning of distributaries, Upper Mouth Birch Creek and Lower Mouth Birch Creek
  - location: upstream on Birch Creek from distributaries' mouths on the Yukon River, Yukon Flats National Wildlife Refuge
  - coordinates: 66°16′13″N 145°30′15″W
  - elevation: 453 ft (138 m)
- Length: 150 mi (240 km)

National Wild and Scenic Rivers System
- Type: Wild 126.0 miles (202.8 km)
- Designated: December 2, 1980

Birch Creek is a 150-mile (240 km) tributary of the Yukon River in the U.S. state of Alaska. Beginning at the confluence of Ptarmigan and Eagle creeks near Porcupine Dome, it flows southwest, then south under the Steese Highway and into the Steese National Conservation Area. It then turns east, then north, again passing under the Steese Highway and entering the Yukon Flats National Wildlife Refuge. Turning northwest, it ends where it splits into two distributaries, Lower Mouth Birch Creek and Upper Mouth Birch Creek, near Birch Creek, Alaska. The distributaries flow into the Yukon River at separate locations downstream of Fort Yukon.

== History ==
The first human inhabitants of the region were probably Gwich'in people who hunted and fished along the creek. Gold was found along the creek in 1893. Circle City sprang up as the Alaska Interior's first gold town, governed democratically by traditional miners' meetings. Old mining and trapping cabins are part of the Birch Creek landscape, and mining continues in the 21st century.

== Distributaries ==
Upper Mouth Birch Creek flows 35 miles (56 km) northwest from Birch Creek to enter the Yukon River 25 miles (40 km) southwest (downstream) of Fort Yukon. The coordinates of the mouth of the Upper Mouth are 66°31′15″N 146°09′09″W.

Lower Mouth Birch Creek flows 50 miles (80 km) southwest from Birch Creek to enter Lower Birch Creek Slough 39 miles (63 km) southwest of Fort Yukon. An anabranch of the Yukon River, the slough flows southwest roughly parallel to the main stem for 15 miles (24 km). The coordinates for the mouth of Lower Mouth Birch Creek are 66°26′46″N 146°38′18″W.

== Recreation ==
The Bureau of Land Management (BLM) oversees 126 miles (203 km) of Birch Creek declared "wild" in 1980 as part of the National Wild and Scenic Rivers System. People floating the stream in canoes, kayaks, or rafts can put in at a BLM wayside and take out at another BLM wayside 110 miles (180 km) further downstream. Both are along the Steese Highway. Between these two points, the creek is rated mostly Class I on the International Scale of River Difficulty, but some segments are rated Class II (medium) or III (difficult).

Sports fishing for northern pike and Arctic grayling along Birch Creek can be "outstanding", according to Alaska Fishing. The larger pike frequent the lower reaches of the creek as well as sloughs, ponds, and oxbow lakes in the Yukon Flats. Grayling prefer the headwaters.

The stream corridor has no developed camping sites. Gravel bars in the creek are sometimes used for camping.

In February, the creek serves as a part of the trail for the Yukon Quest 1,000-mile (1,600 km) sled dog race. Other winter activities along the stream include dog mushing, trapping, and cross-country skiing.

== See also ==
- List of rivers of Alaska
