= Yukon Flats =

Area of wetlands, forest, bog, and low-lying ground in central Alaska, USA

Coordinates: 66°40′N 145°45′W

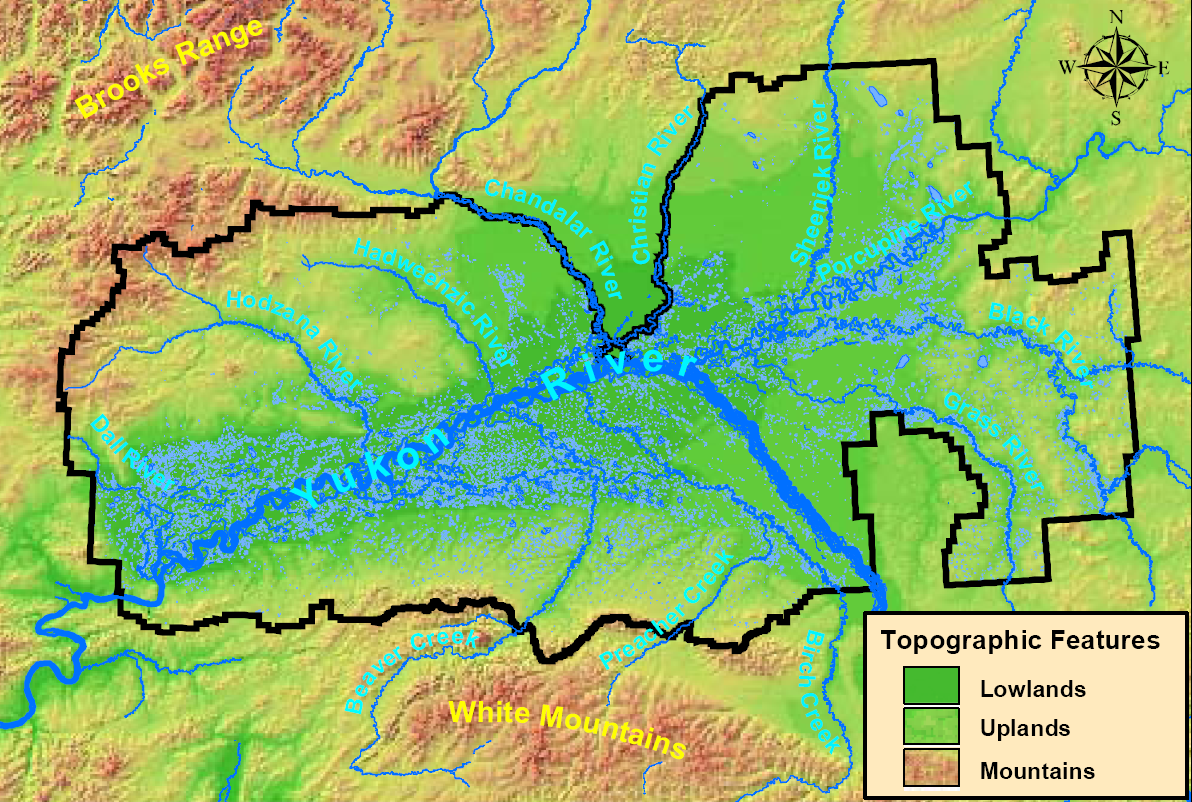
The Yukon Flats National Wildlife Refuge encompasses most of the Yukon Flats.

The Yukon Flats are a vast area of wetlands, forest, bog, and low-lying ground centered on the confluence of the Yukon River, Porcupine River, and Chandalar River in the central portion of the U.S. state of Alaska. The Yukon Flats are bordered in the north by the Brooks Range, in the south by the White Mountains, and cover an area of approximately 11,000 square miles (28,490 km^{2}). The Yukon Flats are a critical waterfowl breeding ground due to the large area of wetland provided by the estimated 40,000 small lakes and streams in the area. In recognition of this fact, the area is protected under the Yukon Flats National Wildlife Refuge.

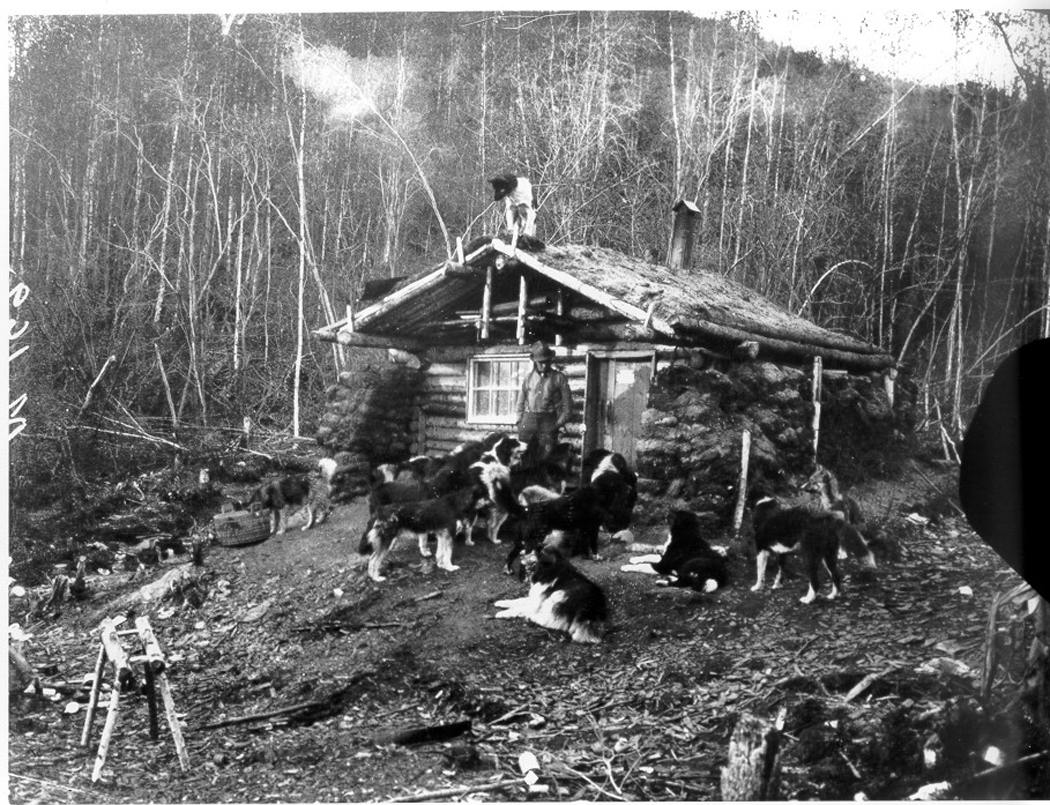
Yukon Flats cabin

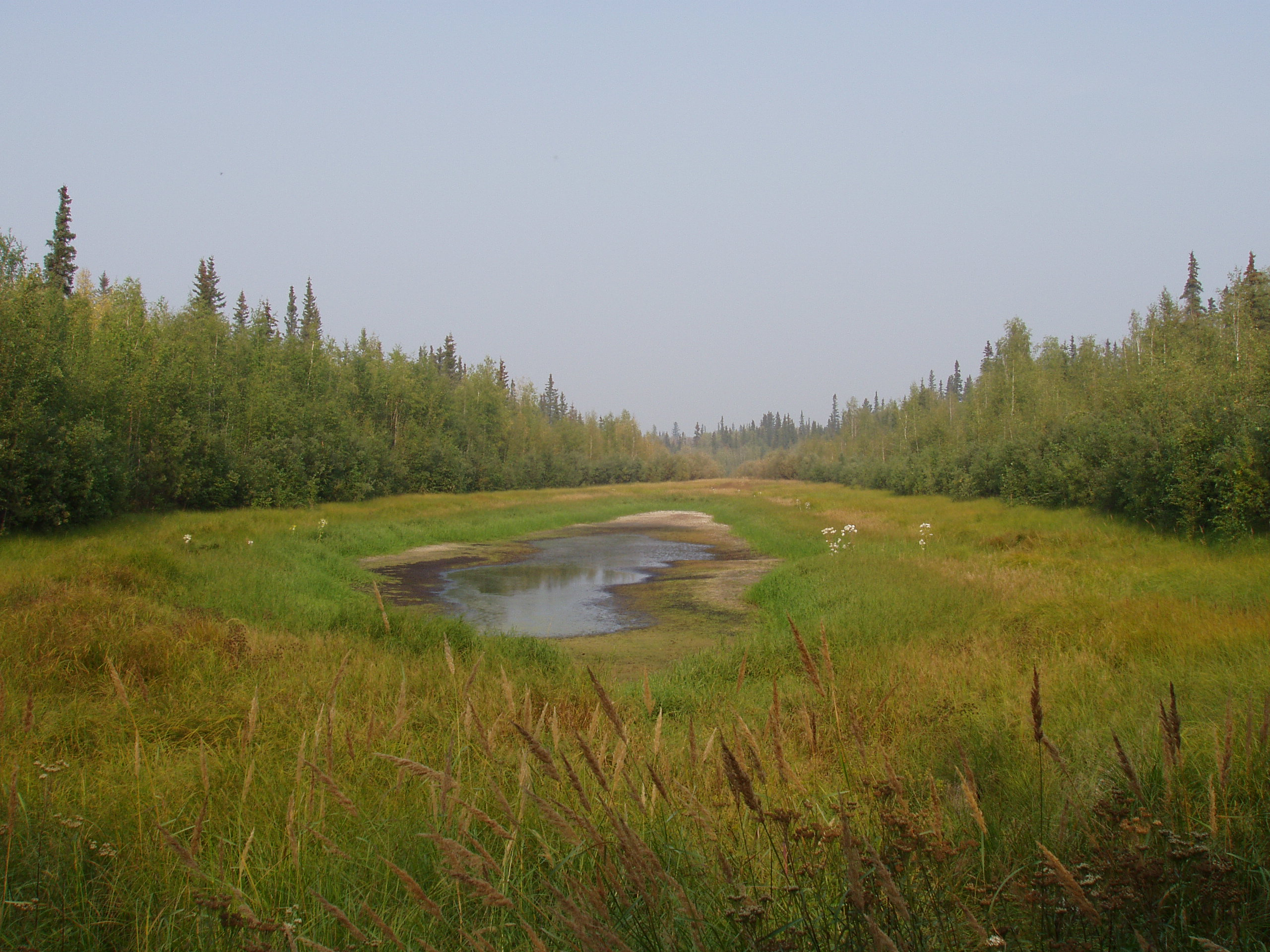
Small hidden lake on Yukon Flats

The Yukon Flats straddle the Arctic Circle and have an extremely variable climate. Temperatures of 95 F (35 °C) are not uncommon in summer, while winter temperatures have been known to drop to -70 F (-57 °C).

Several hundred Alaska Natives and others live in the Yukon Flats area. Though most of the region's people are concentrated in the villages of Fort Yukon, Venetie, Beaver, Stevens Village, Chalkyitsik, and smaller settlements, numerous hunting cabins and seasonal settlements also dot the region. The region also potentially contains a large deposit of crude oil and natural gas.

In 2008, a land trade was proposed between Doyon, Limited and the federal government. The exchange was to consolidate land holdings by the native corporation but was not completed.
