= Hodzana River =

River in Alaska, United States

- Location of the mouth of the Hodzana River in Alaska

Location
- Country: United States
- State: Alaska
- Census Area: Yukon–Koyukuk

Physical characteristics
- Source: southern flanks of the Brooks Range
  - location: west of Dall Mountain on the Arctic Circle
  - coordinates: 66°29′32″N 150°02′59″W
  - elevation: 3,196 ft (974 m)
- Mouth: Hodzana Slough of the Yukon River
  - location: 12 miles (19 km) southwest of Beaver, Yukon Flats National Wildlife Refuge
  - coordinates: 66°17′30″N 147°46′23″W
  - elevation: 335 ft (102 m)
- Length: 125 mi (201 km)

The Hodzana River is a 125-mile (201 km) tributary of the Yukon River in the U.S. state of Alaska. The Yukon Flats National Wildlife Refuge covers a large part of the river basin.

Beginning west of Dall Mountain just south of the Arctic Circle, the river flows northeast into the wildlife refuge, then southeast to Hodzana Slough, an arm of the Yukon. The river mouth is 12 miles (19 km) southwest of Beaver, a village further up the Yukon.

== See also ==
- List of rivers of Alaska
