= Christian River =

- Location of the mouth of the Christian River in Alaska

Location
- Country: United States
- State: Alaska
- Census Area: Yukon–Koyukuk

Physical characteristics
- Source: Brooks Range
  - location: southwest of Shark Edge Mountain
  - coordinates: 68°04′46″N 145°23′07″W
  - elevation: 3,304 ft (1,007 m)
- Mouth: Cutoff Slough of Yukon River
  - location: 17 miles (27 km) northwest of Fort Yukon, Yukon Flats National Wildlife Refuge
  - coordinates: 66°38′09″N 145°49′43″W
  - elevation: 404 ft (123 m)
- Length: 140 mi (230 km)

The Christian River is a 140-mile (230 km) tributary of the Yukon River in the U.S. state of Alaska. Beginning near Shark Edge Mountain in the southern Brooks Range, it flows generally south to Cutoff Slough and thence to the larger river. The mouth is in the Yukon Flats National Wildlife Refuge 17 miles (27 km) northwest of Fort Yukon.

== See also ==
- List of rivers of Alaska
