= Yukon River =

Major watercourse in northwestern North America

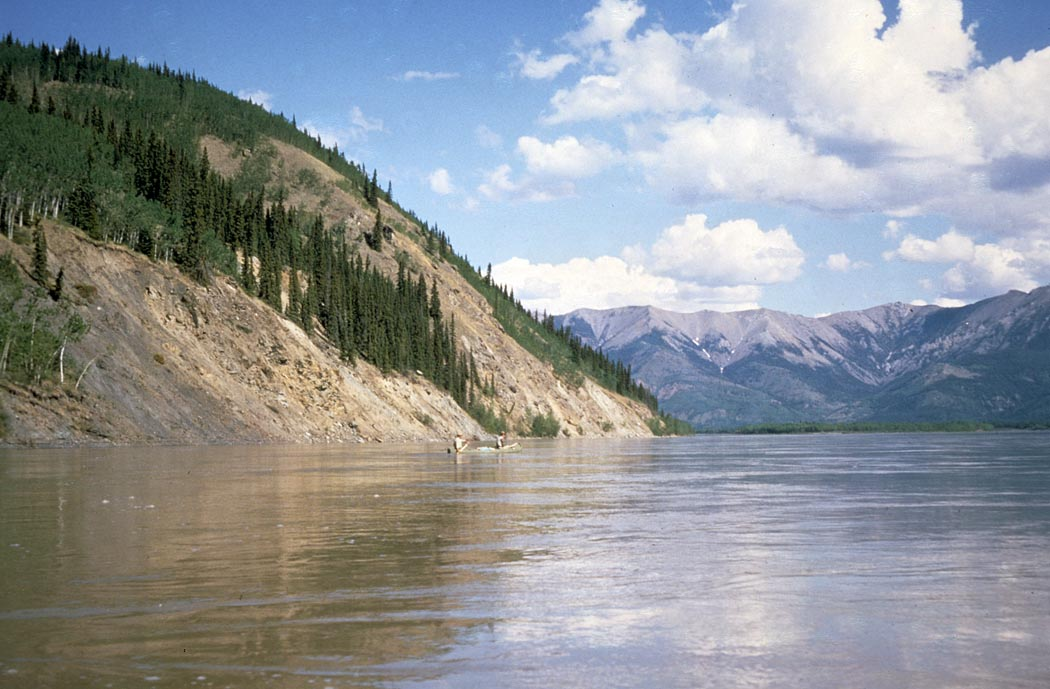
- Canoeing the Yukon River

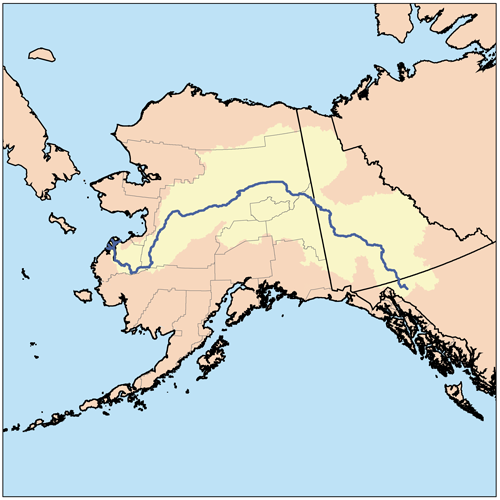
- Location of the Yukon River and watershed
- Native name: Ųųg Han (Gwichʼin); Yuk Han (Gwichʼin); Kuigpak (Central Yupik); Kuukpak (Inupiaq); Yeqin (Degexit'an); Tth'echù' (Hän); Chuu k'onn (Hän); Chu Nìikwän (Southern Tutchone)

Location
- Countries: United States; Canada
- State: Alaska
- Province/Territory: British Columbia; Yukon

Physical characteristics
- Source: Llewellyn Glacier at Atlin Lake
  - location: Atlin District, British Columbia, Canada
  - coordinates: 59°10′N 133°50′W
  - elevation: 669 m (2,195 ft)
- Mouth: Bering Sea
  - location: Kusilvak, Alaska, U.S.
  - coordinates: 62°35′55″N 164°48′00″W
  - elevation: 0 m (0 ft)
- Length: 3,190 km (1,980 mi)
- Basin size: 854,700 km^{2} (330,000 mi^{2})
- Width
  - average: 0.8 km (0.50 mi) Rampart to Tanana; 820–1,000 m (2,690–3,280 ft) (Pilot Station)
- Depth
  - average: 9.1–12.1 m (30–40 ft) (Rampart to Tanana);
  - maximum: 40 m (130 ft) (Rampart); 24.4 m (80 ft) (Pilot Station)
- Discharge
  - location: Yukon Delta
  - average: 7,000 m^{3}/s (250,000 cu ft/s)
- Discharge
  - location: Pilot Station
  - average: (Period: 1976–2024)236,300 cu ft/s (6,690 m^{3}/s)
  - minimum: 35,000 cu ft/s (990 m^{3}/s)(Year: 1984)
  - maximum: 1,240,000 cu ft/s (35,000 m^{3}/s)(Year: 2005)
- Discharge
  - location: Stevens Village
  - average: (Period: 1977–2024)123,300 cu ft/s (3,490 m^{3}/s)
  - minimum: 14,000 cu ft/s (400 m^{3}/s) (Year: 1997)
  - maximum: 827,000 cu ft/s (23,400 m^{3}/s) (Year: 1992)
- Discharge
  - location: Dawson
  - average: (Period: 1944–1980)78,000 cu ft/s (2,200 m^{3}/s)
  - maximum: 527,000 cu ft/s (14,900 m^{3}/s) (Year: 1964)
- Discharge
  - location: Whitehorse
  - average: (Period: 1944–2010)8,600 cu ft/s (240 m^{3}/s)

Basin features
- Progression: Bering Sea
- River system: Yukon River
- Tributaries
  - left: White, Fortymile, Birch Creek, Tanana, Nowitna, Innoko
  - right: Tagish River, Atlin, Teslin, Big Salmon, Pelly, Stewart, Klondike, Porcupine, Christian, Chandalar, Melozitna, Koyukuk, Anvik, Atchuelinguk, Andreafsky

The Yukon River is a major watercourse of northwestern North America. From its source in British Columbia, it flows through Canada's territory of Yukon (itself named after the river). The lower half of the river continues westward through the U.S. state of Alaska. The river is 3,190 kilometres (1,980 mi) long and empties into the Bering Sea at the Yukon–Kuskokwim Delta. The average flow is 6,400–7,000 m^{3}/s (230,000–250,000 cu ft/s). The total drainage area is 854,700 km^{2} (330,000 mi^{2}), of which 323,800 km^{2} (125,000 mi^{2}) lies in Canada.

The longest river in Alaska and Yukon, it was one of the principal means of transportation during the 1896–1903 Klondike Gold Rush. A portion of the river in Yukon—"The Thirty Mile" section, from Lake Laberge to the Teslin River—is a national heritage river and a unit of Klondike Gold Rush International Historical Park. Paddle-wheel riverboats continued to ply the river until the 1950s, when the Klondike Highway was completed. After the purchase of Alaska by the United States in 1867, the Alaska Commercial Company acquired the assets of the Russian-American Company and constructed several posts at various locations on the Yukon River.

The Yukon River has a recent history of pollution from military installations, dumps, wastewater, and other sources. However, the Environmental Protection Agency does not list the Yukon River among its impaired watersheds, and water-quality data from the U.S. Geological Survey shows relatively good levels of turbidity, metals, and dissolved oxygen. The Yukon and Mackenzie rivers have much higher suspended sediment concentrations than major Siberian Arctic rivers.

The Yukon River Inter-Tribal Watershed Council, a cooperative effort of 70 First Nations and tribes in Alaska and Canada, has the goal of making the river and its tributaries safe to drink from again by supplementing and scrutinizing government data.

== Name ==
The name Yukon, or ųųg han, is a contraction of the words in the phrase Gwichʼin: chųų gąįį han, which means white water river and refers to "the pale colour" of glacial runoff in the Yukon River. The contraction is Ųųg Han, if the /ųų/ remains nasalized, or Yuk Han, if there is no vowel nasalization. In the 1840s, the various Dene nations had differing opinions as to the literal meaning of Yukon. In 1843, the Holikachuks had told the Russian-American Company that their name for the river was Yukkhana and that this name meant big river. However, Yukkhana does not literally correspond to a Holikachuk phrase that means big river. Then, two years later, the Gwich'ins told the Hudson's Bay Company that their name for the river was Yukon and that the name meant white water river. White water river in fact corresponds to Gwich'in words that can be shortened to form Yukon. Because the Holikachuks had been trading regularly with both the Gwich’ins and the Yup'iks, the Holikachuks were in a position to borrow the Gwich'in contraction and to conflate its meaning with the meaning of Kuig-pak [River-big], which is the Yup'ik name for the same river. For that reason, the documentary evidence suggests that the Holikachuks had borrowed the contraction Ųųg Han [White Water River] from Gwich'in, and erroneously assumed that this contraction had the same literal meaning as the corresponding Yup'ik name Kuig-pak [River-big].

The Lewes River is the former name of the upper course of the Yukon, from Marsh Lake to the confluence of the Pelly River at Fort Selkirk.

== Course ==
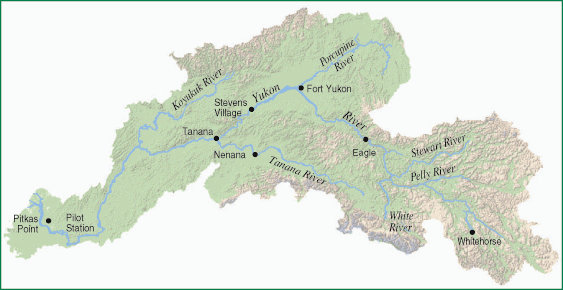
Map of the Yukon River watershed

While geologists, geographers, hydrologists, and ecologists agree that the headwaters of the Yukon River are located within the northern reaches of the glaciated Coast Mountain range in British Columbia, its exact source remains the subject of some debate. According to the United States Geographic Survey, the generally accepted source of the Yukon River is the Llewellyn Glacier at the southern end of Atlin Lake in British Columbia. Others suggest that the source is Lake Lindeman at the northern end of the Chilkoot Trail. Either way, Atlin Lake flows into Tagish Lake (via the Atlin River), as eventually does Lake Lindeman after flowing into Bennett Lake. Tagish Lake then flows into Marsh Lake (via the Tagish River). The Yukon River proper starts at the northern end of Marsh Lake, just south of Whitehorse.

Some argue that the source of the Yukon River should really be Teslin Lake and the Teslin River, which has a larger flow when it reaches the Yukon at Hootalinqua. The upper end of the Yukon River was originally known as the Lewes River until it was established that it actually was the Yukon. North of Whitehorse, the Yukon River widens into Lake Laberge, made famous by Robert W. Service's "The Cremation of Sam McGee". Other large lakes that are part of the Yukon River system include Kusawa Lake (into the Takhini River) and Kluane Lake (into the Kluane and then White River).

The river passes through the communities of Whitehorse, Carmacks, (just before the Five Finger Rapids) and Dawson City in Yukon, and crossing Alaska into Eagle, Circle, Fort Yukon, Stevens Village, Rampart, Tanana, Ruby, Galena, Nulato, Grayling, Holy Cross, Russian Mission, Marshall, Pilot Station, St. Marys (which is accessible from the Yukon at Pitkas Point), and Mountain Village. After Mountain Village, the main Yukon channel frays into many channels, sprawling across the delta. There are a number of communities after the "head of passes," as the channel division is called locally: Nunum Iqua, Alakanuk, Emmonak, and Kotlik. Of those delta communities, Emmonak is the largest with roughly 760 people in the 2000 census. Emmonak's gravel airstrip is the regional hub for flights.

== Hazards ==
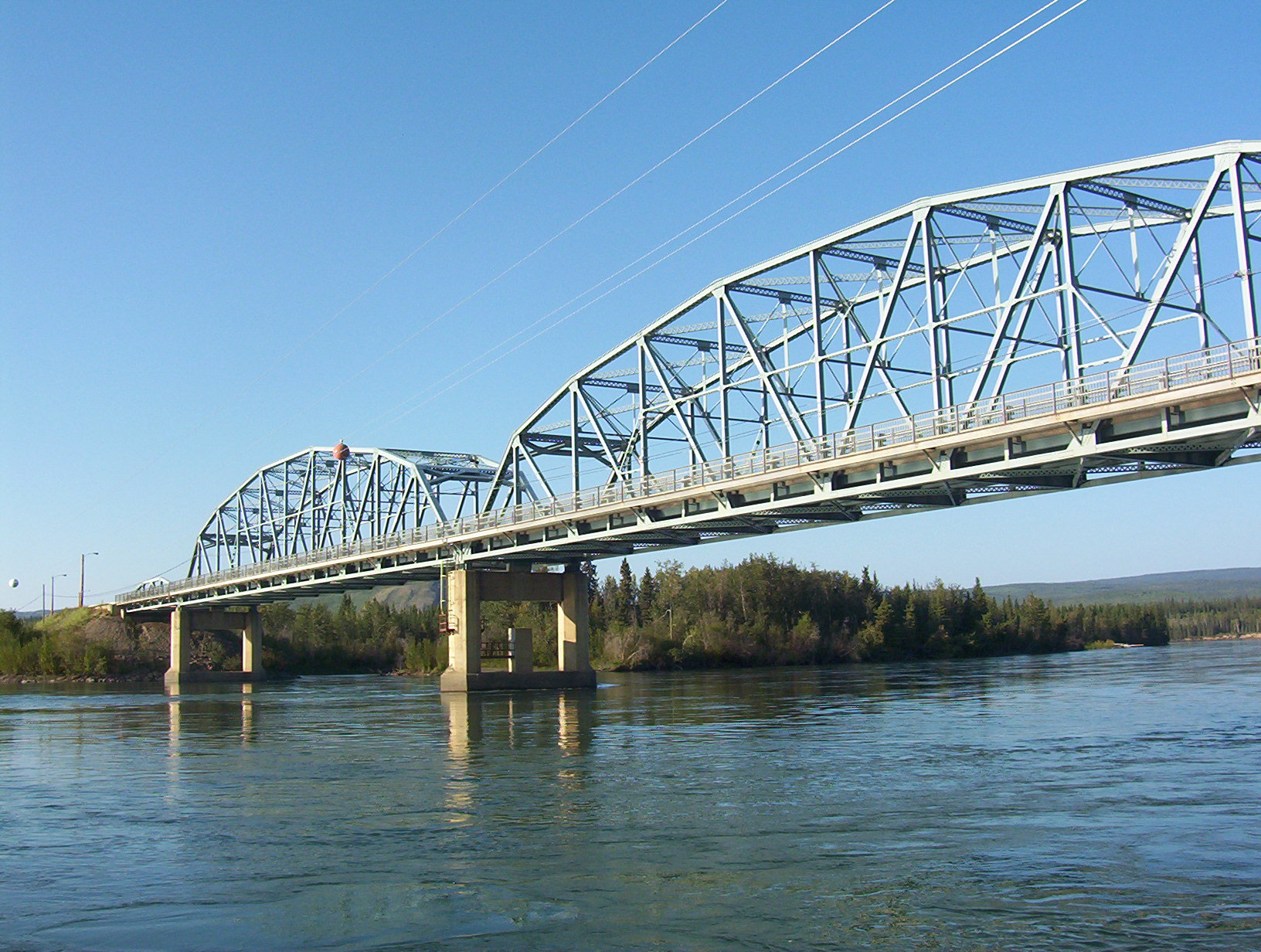
The bridge across the Yukon River at Carmacks on the Klondike Highway

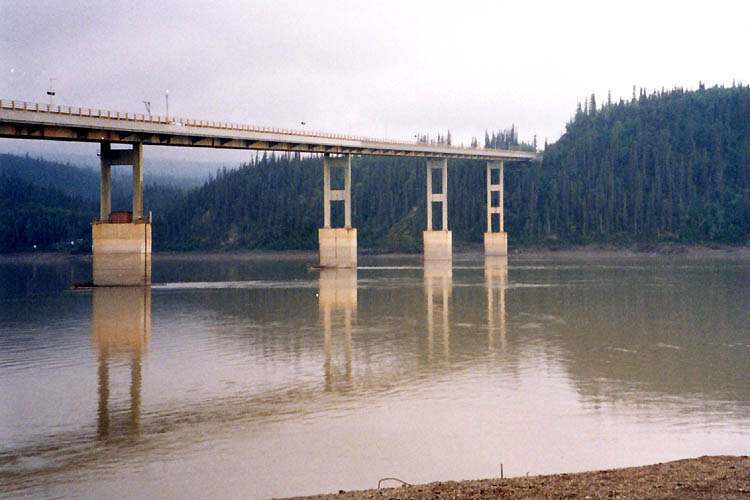
The E. L. Patton Yukon River Bridge carries the Dalton Highway over the Yukon north of Fairbanks.

Navigational obstacles on the Yukon River are the Five Finger Rapids and Rink Rapids downstream from Carmacks.

== Bridges ==
Despite its length, there are only four vehicle-carrying bridges across the river, listed from upstream to downstream:

- The Lewes Bridge, north of Marsh Lake, Yukon, on the Alaska Highway;
- The Robert Campbell Bridge, which connects the Whitehorse suburb of Riverdale to the downtown area;
- The Yukon River Bridge in Carmacks, Yukon, on the Klondike Highway; and
- The Yukon River Bridge, north of Fairbanks, Alaska on the Dalton Highway.

A car ferry crosses the river at Dawson City in the summer; it is replaced by an ice bridge over the frozen river during the winter. Plans to build a permanent bridge were announced in March 2004, although they were subsequently put on hold because bids came in much higher than budgeted.

There are also two pedestrian-only bridges in Whitehorse, as well as a dam across the river and a hydroelectric generating station. The construction of the dam flooded the White Horse Rapids, which gave the city its name, and created Schwatka Lake.

Transportation is also performed along the river in summer by barge, enabling heavy goods, oil, and vehicles to be transported to communities along the Yukon, Tanana, Innoko, and Koyukuk rivers. This service is performed by Ruby Marine and reaches Tanana on the Yukon River and Nenana on the Tanana River.

== Ecology ==
Some of the upper slopes of this watershed (e.g. Nulato Hills) are forested by Black Spruce. This locale near the Seward Peninsula represents the near westernmost limit of the Black Spruce, Picea mariana, one of the most widespread conifers in northern North America.

The river flows into several parklands and refuges including:

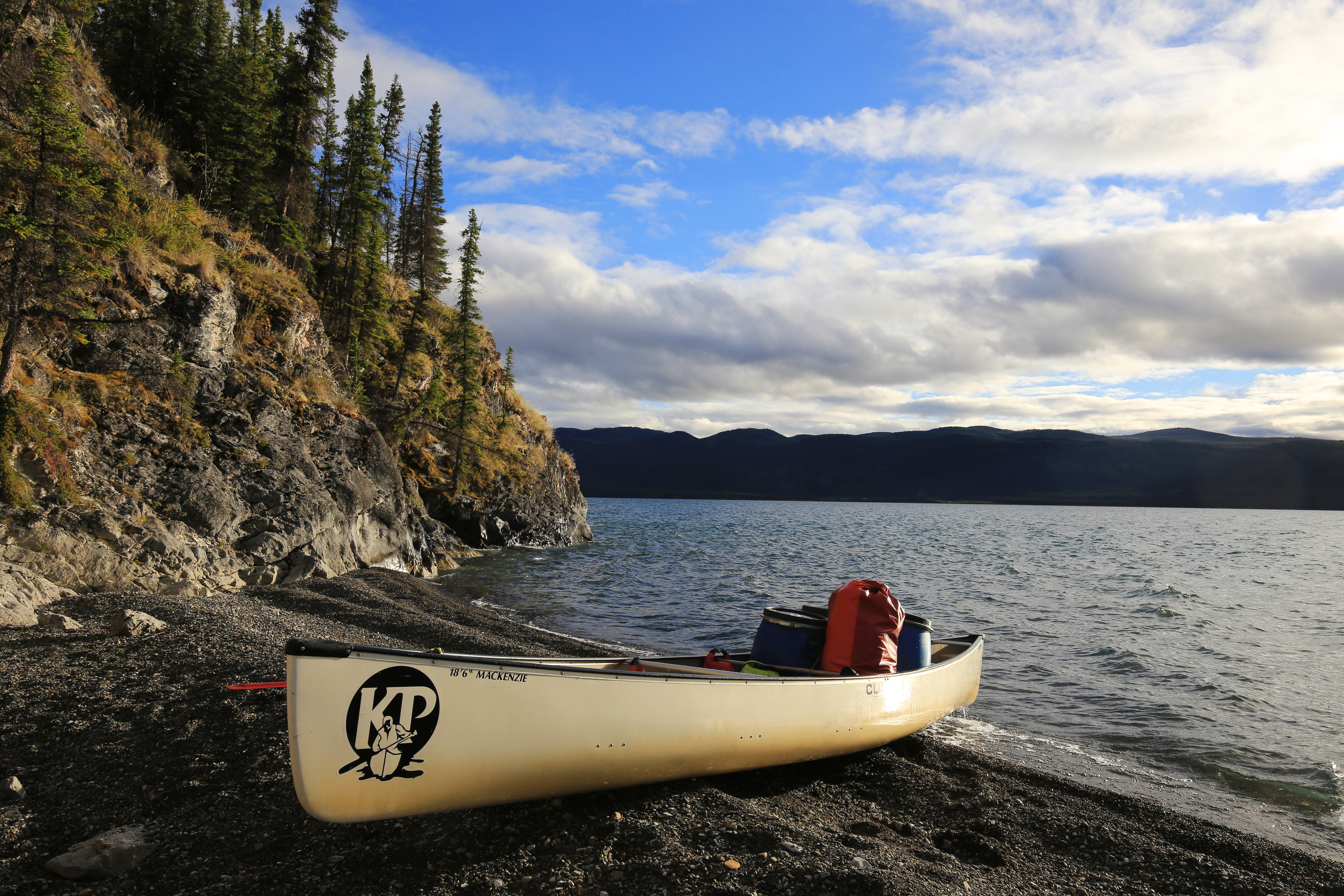
Crossing the Lake Laberge by canoe

- Innoko National Wildlife Refuge
- Nowitna National Wildlife Refuge
- Yukon-Charley Rivers National Preserve
- Yukon Delta National Wildlife Refuge
- Yukon Flats National Wildlife Refuge

== Discharge ==
Yukon at Pilot Station (121 miles upstream of mouth) minimum, average and maximum discharge:

Water year	Discharge (Period: 1975/10/01 – 2024/09/30)						
Water year	Min		Mean			Max	
Water year	cfs	m^{3}/s	cfs	m^{3}/s	km^{3}	cfs	m^{3}/s
1975/76	65,000	1,840	218,300	6,182	195	700,000	19,800
1976/77	44,000	1,250	204,100	5,779	182	669,000	18,900
1977/78	42,000	1,190	185,300	5,247	166	465,000	13,200
1978/79	40,000	1,130	224,200	6,349	200	587,000	16,600
1979/80	50,000	1,420	236,900	6,708	212	660,000	18,700
1980/81	40,000	1,130	229,600	6,502	205	563,000	15,900
1981/82	38,000	1,080	240,800	6,819	215	866,000	24,500
1982/83	45,000	1,270	218,900	6,199	196	554,000	15,700
1983/84	35,000	990	231,900	6,567	207	642,000	18,200
1984/85	40,000	1,130	239,200	6,773	214	1,100,000	31,150
1985/86	50,000	1,420	231,400	6,553	207	585,000	16,600
1986/87	47,000	1,330	223,800	6,337	200	649,000	18,400
1987/88	50,000	1,420	218,700	6,193	195	680,000	19,300
1988/89	55,000	1,560	225,500	6,385	202	800,000	22,650
1989/90	47,000	1,330	235,400	6,666	210	900,000	25,500
1990/91	50,000	1,420	249,800	7,074	223	1,070,000	30,300
1991/92	46,000	1,300	239,500	6,782	214	788,000	22,300
1992/93	50,000	1,420	240,400	6,807	215	854,000	24,200
1993/94	50,000	1,420	253,700	7,184	227	660,000	18,700
1994/95	42,000	1,190	218,300	6,182	195	696,000	19,700
1995/96	36,000	1,020	209,700	5,938	187	502,000	14,200
1996/97	No incomplete data have been used for statistical calculation						
1997/98	No incomplete data have been used for statistical calculation						
1998/99	No incomplete data have been used for statistical calculation						
1999/00	No incomplete data have been used for statistical calculation						
2000/01	46,000	1,300	249,500	7,067	223	901,000	25,500
2001/02	38,000	1,080	210,400	5,958	188	884,000	25,000
2002/03	48,000	1,360	236,500	6,697	211	543,000	15,400
2003/04	46,500	1,320	211,800	5,998	189	648,000	18,350
2004/05	41,000	1,160	254,600	7,209	228	1,240,000	35,100
2005/06	45,000	1,270	252,300	7,144	226	920,000	26,050
2006/07	38,000	1,080	213,600	6,048	191	531,000	15,000
2007/08	40,500	1,150	231,600	6,558	207	775,000	21,950
2008/09	48,000	1,360	231,900	6,567	207	1,090,000	30,900
2009/10	42,000	1,190	205,600	5,822	184	675,000	19,100
2010/11	47,000	1,330	227,000	6,428	203	670,000	19,000
2011/12	44,000	1,250	247,700	7,014	221	660,000	18,700
2012/13	48,500	1,370	231,700	6,561	207	820,000	23,200
2013/14	45,000	1,270	266,400	7,544	238	553,000	15,700
2014/15	55,000	1,560	229,400	6,499	205	621,000	17,600
2015/16	58,000	1,640	274,600	7,776	245	603,000	17,100
2016/17	46,700	1,320	214,900	6,085	192	562,000	15,900
2017/18	48,000	1,360	257,600	7,294	230	669,000	18,900
2018/19	60,900	1,730	233,300	6,606	208	647,000	18,300
2019/20	52,400	1,480	290,900	8,237	260	704,000	19,900
2020/21	50,900	1,440	262,200	7,425	234	589,000	16,700
2021/22	49,400	1,400	269,900	7,643	241	682,000	19,300
2022/23	64,900	1,840	300,900	8,520	269	1,140,000	32,300
2023/24	63,000	1,780	266,700	7,552	238	664,000	18,800

== Fisheries ==
The Yukon River is home to one of the longest salmon runs in the world. Each year Chinook, coho, and chum salmon return to their terminal streams in Alaska, the Yukon Territory, and British Columbia. As salmon do not eat during their spawning migration, Yukon River salmon must have great reserves of fat and energy to fuel their thousands-mile-long journey. The Chinook, which arrive at the mouth of the Yukon River in early June, have the longest journey – as many as 2,000 miles against the current, with an estimated 35–50% bound for Canada. As a result, Chinook salmon are noted for their especially rich and fatty meat and are the priciest of all Pacific salmon species.

The villages along the Yukon have historically relied on and continue to rely on salmon for their cultural, subsistence, and commercial needs. Salmon are traditionally dried, smoked, and frozen for both human and sled dog consumption. Common methods of fishing on the Yukon include set gillnets, drift nets, dip nets, and fish wheels. The preference of certain gear is largely dependent on the river's varied characteristics in different areas. Some parts of the river do not have eddies to make set-nets successful, whereas in other places the tributaries are small enough to make drifting impractical.

Over the last 20 years salmon recruitment, the number of returning adults, has taken several shocks. The late 1980s, 1990s, and 2000s have been marked by radically reduced runs for various salmon species. In the summer of 2023, the U.S. Fish and Wildlife Service counted 58,500 Chinook salmon, the second lowest season on record. The United States Department of Commerce issued a Federal Disaster Declaration for the 2008 and 2009 Commercial Chinook Yukon River fisheries, calling for the complete closure of commercial fishing along with restrictions on subsistence fishing. The root cause of these poor returns remains debated, with questions about the effects of climate change on ocean food-supply & disease prevalence in returning adults, the methods of fishing used on the river, and the effects of the Bering Sea Pollock trawl fleet on food supply and salmon bycatch. In 2010, the Alaska Department of Fish & Game's Board of Fisheries issued the first-ever restriction for net mesh size on the Yukon, reducing it to 7.5 inches (190 mm). In 2021, the Alaska Department of Fish & Game's Division of Commercial Fisheries banned all fishing of Chinook and chum salmon, including for subsistence.

Various organizations are involved to protect healthy salmon runs into the future. The Yukon River Drainage Fisheries Association was formed in 1990 by a consensus of fishers representing the entire drainage in response to recent disaster years. Its organizational goals include giving voice to the village fishers that have traditionally managed these resources, enabling communication between fishers and fishery managers, and helping to preserve the ecological integrity of salmon runs and local cultures' Traditional Ecological Knowledge

In March 2001, the U.S. & Canadian governments passed the Yukon River Salmon Agreement to better manage an internationally shared resource and ensure that more Canadian-originated salmon return across the border. The agreement is implemented through the Yukon River Panel, an international body of 12 members, equal-parts American and Canadian, that advises managers of Yukon River fisheries concerning restoration, conservation, and coordinated management.

Tribal organizations such as the Association of Village Council Presidents (AVCP), Council of Athabascan Tribal Governments (CATG), and Tanana Chiefs Conference (TCC) work to sustain Yukon River salmon to promote healthy people, cultures, and communities.

== Tributaries ==
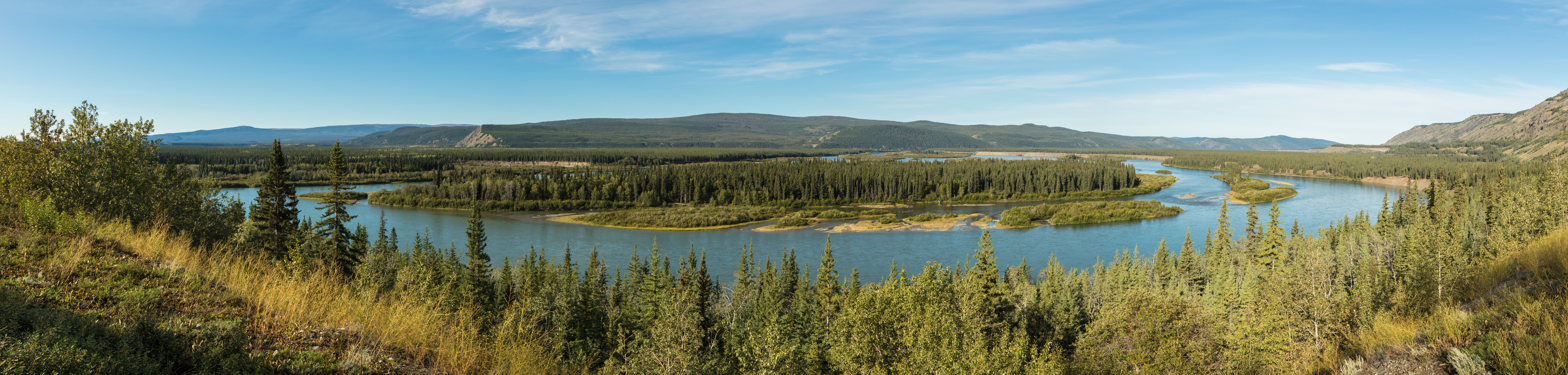
Yukon River near Carmacks

=== Yukon Territory ===
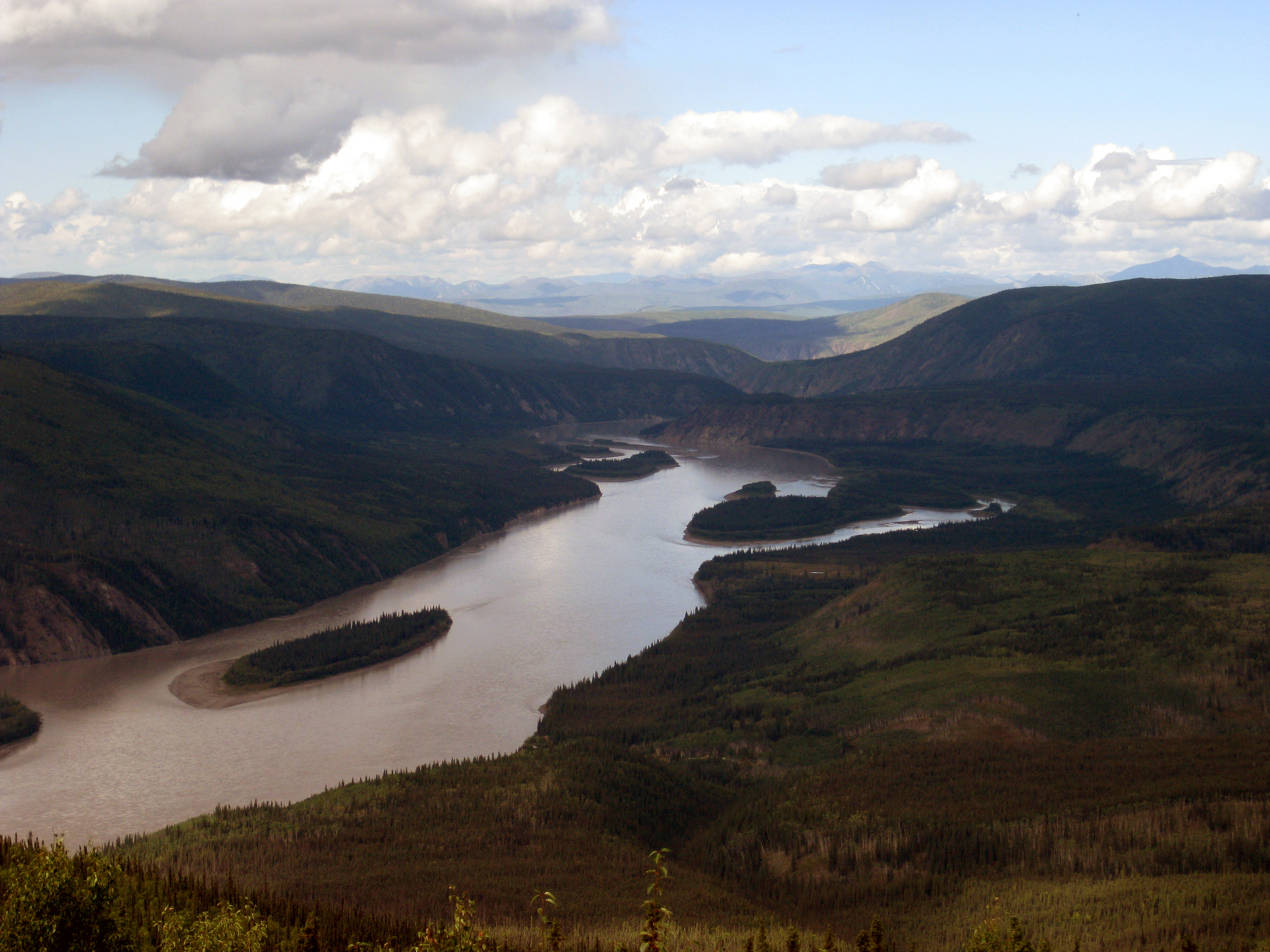
The Yukon River, as seen from the Midnight Dome in Dawson City, Yukon

- Takhini River
- Big Salmon River
- Little Salmon River (Yukon)
- Nordenskiold River
- Teslin River
- Pelly River
  - Macmillan River
- Stewart River
  - Nadaleen River
  - Lansing River
  - Hess River
  - Mayo River
  - McQuesten River
- White River
  - Donjek River
    - Kluane River
    - Nisling River
  - Beaver Creek
- Sixtymile River
- Indian River
- Klondike River
- Fortymile River

=== Alaska ===
- Tatonduk River
- Seventymile River
- Nation River
- Fourth of July Creek
- Kandik River
- Charley River
- Porcupine River
  (tributaries in the Yukon)
  - Miner tributaries
    - Fishing Branch
  - Bell River
    - Eagle River
    - Rock River (Yukon)
  - Driftwood River (Yukon)
  - Old Crow River
  - Bluefish River
  (tributaries in Alaska)
  - Coleen River
  - Black River
    - Wood River
    - Bear Mountain Creek
    - Mountain Creek
  - Chandalar Creek
  - Sheenjek River
    - Sheenjek River East Fork
    - Koness River
    - Eskimo Creek
- Christian River
- Chandalar River
  - East Fork Chandalar River
    - Junjik River
    - Wind River
  - Middle Fork Chandalar River
  - North Fork Chandalar River
  - West Fork Chandalar River
  - Marten Creek
- Birch Creek
- Hadweenzic River
- Beaver Creek
- Hodzana River
- Dall River
- Ray River
- Big Salt River
- Hess Creek
- Garnet Creek
  - Fish Creek
- Texas Creek
- Coal Creek
- Tanana River
  - Nabesna River
  - Chisana River
  - Tetlin River
  - Goodpaster River
  - Delta River
  - Salcha River
  - Chena River
  - Wood River
  - Nenana River
  - Tolovana River
  - Kantishna River
- NC Creek
- Tozitna River
  - Bluebell Creek
  - Dagislakhna Creek
    - Banddana Creek
- Blind River
- Bering Creek
- Nowitna River
  - Sulatna River
- Big Creek
  - Beaver Creek
  - Glacier Creek
- Melozitna River
  - Black Sand Creek
  - Little Melozitna River
- Ruby Slough
- Yuki River
  - East Fork Yuki River
- Kala Creek
  - Kelly Creek
- Galena Creek
- Bishop Creek

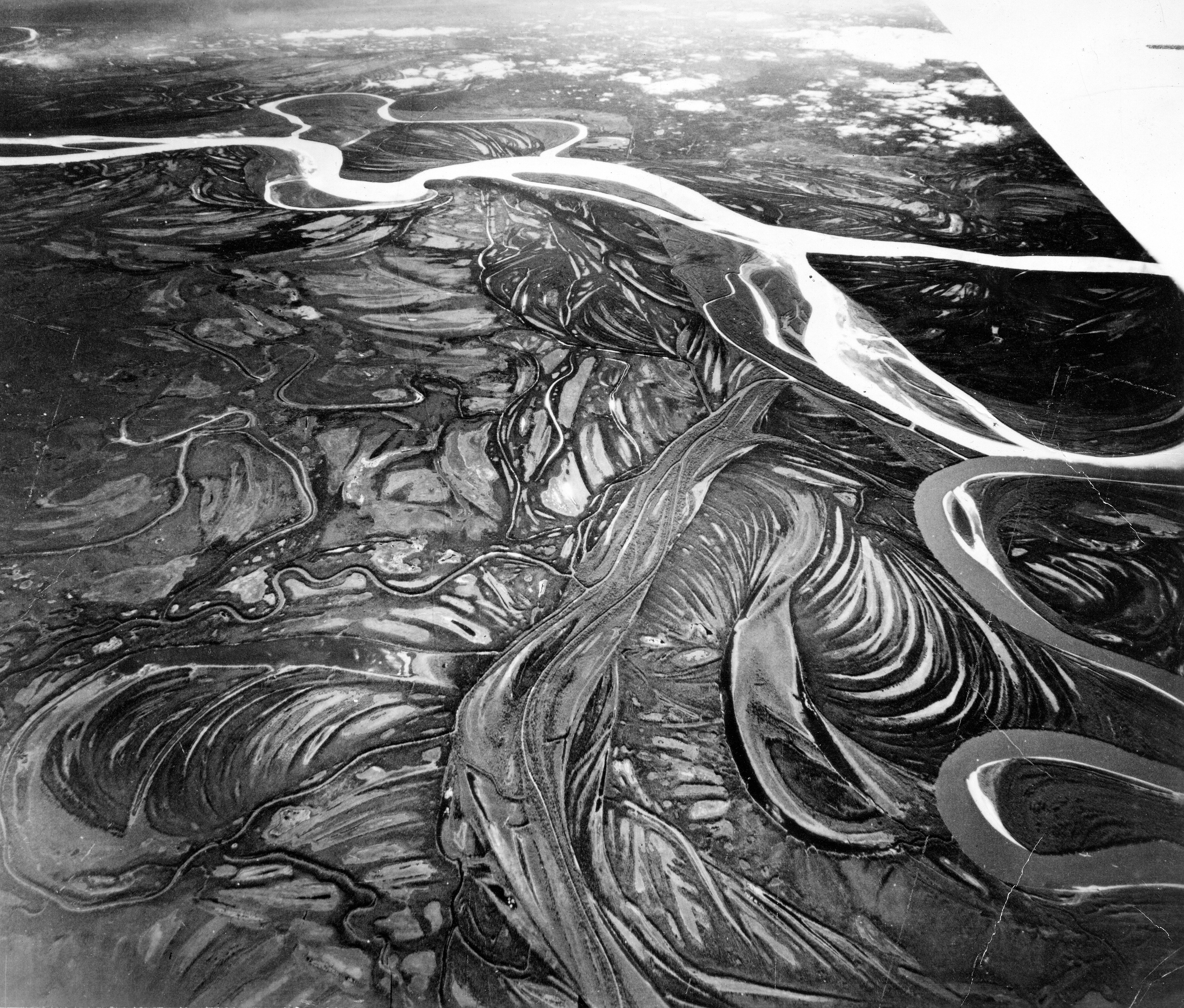
Anabranches near the junction of the Yukon River and the Koyukuk River in Alaska, August 24, 1941

- Koyukuk River
  - Workyard Creek
  - Gisasa River
  - Kateel River
  - Dulbi River
  - Huslia River
    - Nulitna River
    - Tom Cook Slough
    - Billy Hawk Creek
  - Cutoff Slough
  - Hogatza River
    - Clear Creek
  - Batza River
  - Matthews Slough
    - Little Indian River
    - Indian River
      - Calamity Creek
    - Pocahontas Creek
  - Kanuti River
  - Discovery Creek
  - Alatna River
    - Siruk Creek
  - South Fork Koyokouk River
    - Jim River
  - Jane Creek
  - John River
  - North Fork Koyukuk River
- Nulato River
- Khotol River
- Anvik River
- Bonasila River
  - Stuyahok River
- Innoko River
  - Paimiut Slough
    - Reindeer River
  - Iditarod River
    - Yetna River
    - First Chance Creek
  - Mud River
  - Dishna River
    - Coffee Creek
    - Tolstoi Creek
      - Madison Creek
      - Mastodon Creek
        - Hurst Creek
  - Taft Creek
  - Finland Creek
  - Scandinavian Creek
  - North Fork Innoko River
    - Tango Creek
    - West Fork North Fork Innoko River
  - Colorado Creek
- Kako Creek
- Engineer Creek
- Reindeer River
- Atchuelinguk River
- Andreafsky River
- Kashunuk River (distributary)

=== List of major tributaries ===
The main river and tributaries are (sorted in order from the mouth heading upstream):

Left tributary	Right tributary	Length (km)	Basin size (km^{2})	Average discharge (m^{3}/s)^{*}
Yukon		3,190	854,700	7,000
Yukon Delta
	Nanvaranak Slough		1,735	28.1
	Archuelinguk	56	705	12.8
Lower Yukon
	Andreafsky	193	5,369	91.4
Kashunuk (distributary)		362	2,906	51.7
	Atchuelinguk	266	5,439	73.8
Reindeer		97	1,191	22
Talbiksok		129	1,857	26.5
	Kako Creek		550	9.8
Innoko		805	36,517	335.5
Koserefski		48	897	13.1
	Bonasila	201	3,108	43.7
	Anvik	225	4,610	65
Khotol		137	2,331	40.1
	Nulato	114	2,287	54.2
	Koyukuk	805	81,326	770
	Bear Creek		789	10.8
Kala Creek			893	13
Yuki		137	2,771	33.4
	Melozitna	217	7,045	67.6
Big Creek			814	4.6
Nowitna		455	18,596	102.4
Blind		34	587	3.4
Boney Creek		72	788	3.9
	Tozitna	134	4,248	28.2
Tanana		1,061	113,959	1,246
Middle Yukon
Hess Creek		80	3,082	15.6
	Ray	69	1,751	14.2
	Dall	129	3,714	17.6
Old Lost Creek				10.3
	Hodzana	201	4,323	19.5
Beaver Creek		290	5,426	54.9
	Hadweenzic	150	2,422	19.4
Birch Creek		241	13,064	127
	Chandalar	328	24,165	141.8
	Christian	225	8,827	67.8
	Porcupine	916	116,431	623
Charley		142	4,377	22.7
	Kandik	132	2,840	19.7
	Nation	113	2,411	24.6
	Tatonduk	110		15.6
Upper Yukon
Seventymile		93		7.5
Fortymile		97	16,602	79.4
	Klondike	161	8,044	63.9
	Indian		2,242	20.4
Sixtymile		137	3,719	25.4
	Stewart	533	51,023	510
White		322	46,900	566
	Pelly	608	48,174	412
Nordenskiöld			6,371	16
	Little Salmon		3,626	9.7
	Big Salmon	240	6,760	67.6
	Teslin	393	35,014	331
Takhini		180	6,993	103.1
	Atlin		6,812	110

^{*}Period: 1971–2000

== In media ==
The Yukon River features as the setting for the 2015 National Geographic Channel series Yukon River Run.

== See also ==
- Alaska salmon fishery
- List of longest rivers of Canada
- List of longest rivers of the United States (by main stem)
- List of rivers of Alaska
- List of Yukon rivers
- List of rivers of British Columbia
- Steamboats of the Yukon River
