= Melozitna River =

- Location of the mouth of the Melozitna River in Alaska

Location
- Country: United States
- State: Alaska
- Census Area: Yukon–Koyukuk

Physical characteristics
- Source: Ray Mountains
  - coordinates: 66°02′43″N 152°46′02″W
  - elevation: 1,529 ft (466 m)
- Mouth: Yukon River
  - location: 2 miles (3 km) northeast of Ruby
  - coordinates: 64°45′47″N 155°27′29″W
  - elevation: 157 ft (48 m)
- Length: 135 mi (217 km)

The Melozitna River is a 135-mile (217 km) tributary of the Yukon River in the U.S. state of Alaska. It flows generally southwest from the Ray Mountains to its mouth near the city of Ruby.

== Boating ==
It is possible to run the Melozitna in many kinds of non-motorized boats. Most of the river is slow-moving and meandering, rated Class I (easy) on the International Scale of River Difficulty. The exception occurs in the 10-mile (16 km) Melozitna Canyon on the lower river, where a 4-mile (6 km) series of rapids may require portaging. This part of the river is rated Class II (medium) to Class IV (very difficult).

Dangers include high populations of grizzly bears along the middle reaches of the river and black bears along the lower reaches. The canyon portage can be difficult.

== Melozitna Hot Springs ==
Melozitna Hot Springs or Melozi Hot Springs is a mineral hot spring destination located on a tributary of the Melozitna River, known as the Big Melozi. The hot springs is located about 10 miles from the main river. The hot springs are about 16 miles north of the Yukon River 30 miles below Tanana. Melozi Hot Springs is in the course of Hot Springs Creek, 3.5 miles E of its mouth, 26 mi. NNW of Hochandochtia Mtn., Kokrine-Hodzana High.; 65"54'30" N, 154"50'30" W. The local name was reported by the USGS in 1954.

=== History ===
A two-room cabin and a dog house were built on the gravel bank near the springs. Two small log bathhouses, possibly built earlier on each side of the springs, had wooden tubs and sweat chambers and were in operation in 1911. The bathhouses were used in winter by both whites and natives but less in the summer due to having difficult summer trails. The analysis of the water in 1915 showed clear dark water similar to black sulfur waters. In 1915, the Kokrines supported the Hub Roadhouse, a small trading point and post office on the north side of the Yukon River. The distance from there was about 16 miles.

== See also ==
- List of rivers of Alaska
