= Andreafsky River =

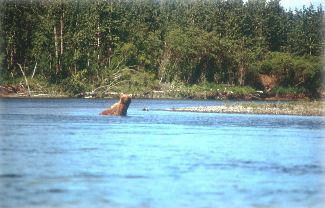
- Andreafsky River

- Location of the mouth of the Andreafsky River in Alaska
- Etymology: Northern one
- Native name: Negeqliq (Central Yupik)

Location
- Country: United States
- State: Alaska
- Census Area: Nome, Kusilvak

Physical characteristics
- Source: Yukon Delta National Wildlife Refuge
  - location: Iprugalet Mountain, Nome Census Area
  - coordinates: 63°08′27″N 161°42′37″W
  - elevation: 1,487 ft (453 m)
- Mouth: Yukon River
  - location: Pitkas Point, near St. Mary's, Kusilvak Census Area
  - coordinates: 62°01′45″N 163°15′09″W
  - elevation: 10 ft (3.0 m)
- Length: 193 km (120 mi)
- Basin size: 5,369.1 km^{2} (2,073.0 mi^{2})
- Discharge
  - location: St. Mary's (near mouth)
  - average: 91.428 m^{3}/s (3,228.7 cu ft/s)

National Wild and Scenic River
- Type: Wild 265 miles (426 km)
- Designated: December 2, 1980

The Andreafsky River (Yup'ik: Negeqliq) is a 120-mile (190 km) tributary of the Yukon River in the U.S. state of Alaska. The Andreafsky flows south from near Iprugalet Mountain in the Yukon Delta National Wildlife Refuge to meet the larger river at Pitkas Point, near the village of St. Mary's.

In 1980, the Andreafsky and the East Fork Andreafsky rivers became part of the National Wild and Scenic Rivers System. The designation covers about 265 river miles (RM) or 426 river kilometers (RK) along the two streams and their headwaters. About 198 RM (319 RK) of these flow through the Yukon Delta Wilderness; 54 RM (87 RK) cross private lands, and 13 RM (21 RK) flow through a wild-river corridor within non-wilderness refuge lands.

== Flora and fauna ==
Black spruce and white spruce, balsam poplar, and large bogs dominate the land near the rivers, while willow shrubs, mosses, lichens, and other vegetation grows on the tundra at higher elevations in the watershed.

Wildlife includes foxes, beavers, bald eagles, golden eagles, falcons, hawks, owls, geese, and large populations of brown bears. Bristle-thighed curlews have one of their main nesting grounds in the upstream (Nulato Hills) portion of the wilderness. Grayling, salmon, and Dolly Varden trout are found in both rivers.

== Boating ==
The Andreasky is suitable for boating by small raft, folding canoe or kayak, or inflatable canoe or kayak for 105 miles (169 km) of its length, and the East Fork is similarly suitable for 122 miles (196 km). Both rivers are rated Class I (easy) on the International Scale of River Difficulty. The put-in places on the upper rivers are remote and difficult to reach, either by hired boat out of St. Mary's or an air taxi that can land on gravel bars. Dangers include bears.

Neither river is ice-free until June 1 or later. Water levels fluctuate after that: high in June, low in July, high again by mid-August, and usually floatable throughout September.

== See also ==
- List of National Wild and Scenic Rivers
- List of rivers of Alaska
