= Big Salmon River (Yukon) =

River in Yukon Territory, Canada

Coordinates: 61.8806°N 134.9217°W

The Big Salmon River is a tributary of the Yukon River The encampment of Big Salmon Village lies at the confluence of the Big Salmon and Yukon Rivers.

== Geography and ecology ==
Black spruce is a dominant tree in the Big Salmon River watershed. This locale near the Seward Peninsula represents the near westernmost limit of the Black Spruce, Picea mariana, one of the most widespread conifers in northern North America.

== See also ==
- List of rivers of Yukon
