= Arctic Village, Alaska =

Arctic Village Vashrąįį Kʼǫǫ (Gwichʼin)
- CDP
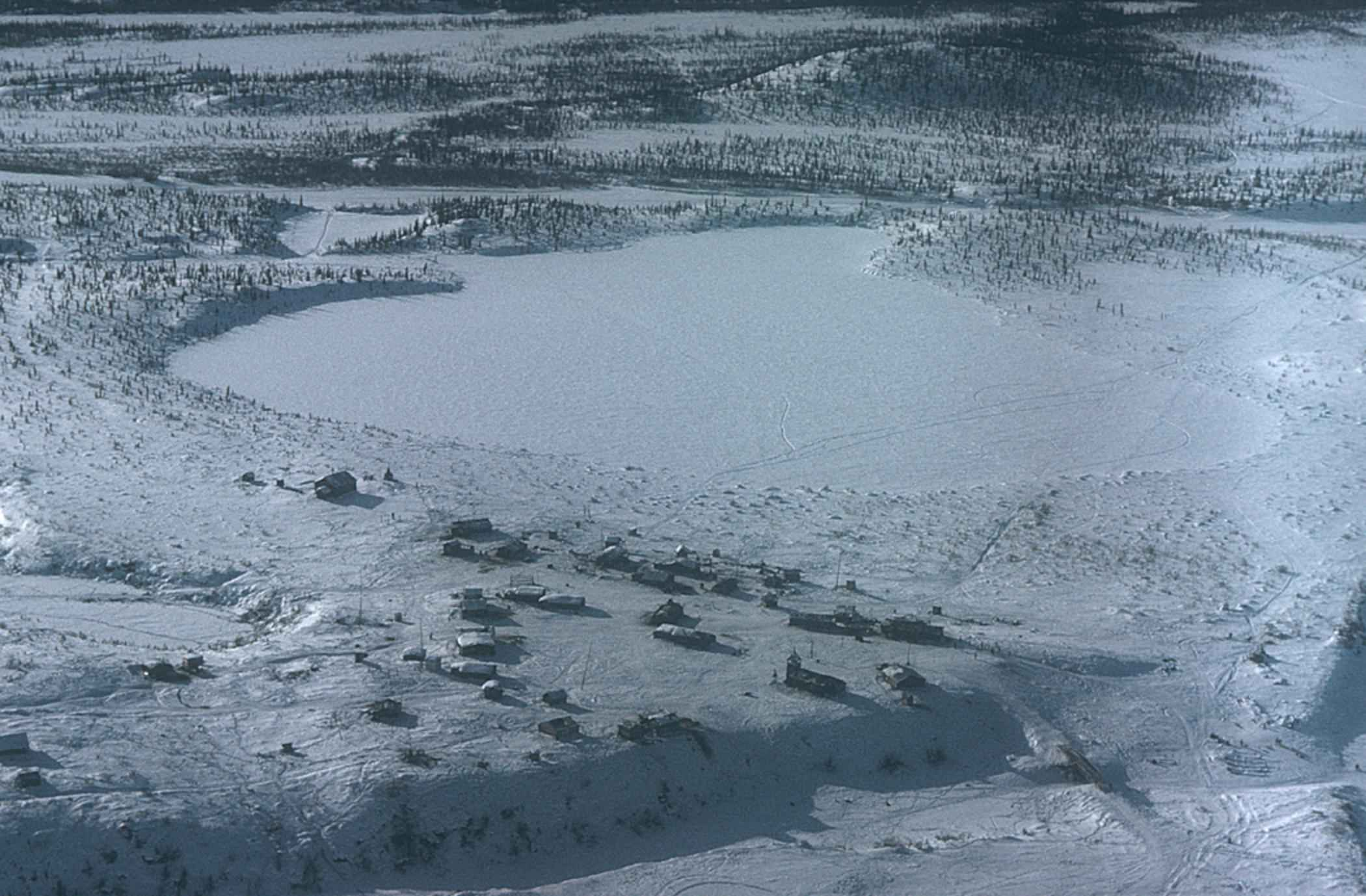
- Aerial view of Arctic Village in wintertime

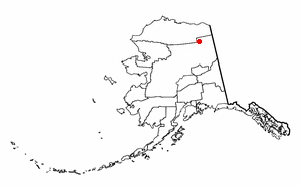
- Location of Arctic Village, Alaska
- Coordinates: 68°7′19″N 145°31′40″W
- Country: United States
- State: Alaska
- Census Area: Yukon-Koyukuk

Government
  - State senator: Mike Cronk (R)
  - State rep.: Rebecca Schwanke (R)

Area
  - Total: 69.97 sq mi (181.23 km^{2})
  - Land: 63.78 sq mi (165.20 km^{2})
  - Water: 6.19 sq mi (16.03 km^{2})

Population (2020)
  - Total: 151
  - Density: 2.4/sq mi (0.91/km^{2})
- Time zone: UTC-9 (Alaska (AKST))
  - Summer (DST): UTC-8 (AKDT)
- ZIP code: 99722
- Area code: 907
- FIPS code: 02-03990

Arctic Village (Gwichʼin: Vashrąįį Kʼǫǫ) is an unincorporated Native American village and a census-designated place (CDP) in Yukon-Koyukuk Census Area, Alaska, United States. As of the 2020 census, Arctic Village had a population of 151. The village is located in the large Gwichʼin speaking region of Alaska, and the local dialect is known as Diʼhaii Gwich’in, wherein the word for 'my mother' is shahanh. As of 1999, over 95% of the community speaks and understands the language. As of 2019, the second village chief was against oil drilling because of the impact on caribou.

== History ==
Evidence from archaeological investigations indicate that the Arctic Village area may have been settled as early as 4500 BC. Around 500 AD the Athabascan speaking Gwichʼin people (often called Neetsʼaii Gwichʼin or "those who dwell to the north") came into the area with seasonal hunting and fishing camps. About 1900, the village became a permanent settlement.

== Language ==
Written documentation of the Gwich’in language dates to the 1870s, when Christian missionaries began producing texts as part of their translation and missionary efforts among the Gwich’in people. These early materials represent some of the first recorded uses of the language in written form.

A standardized modern writing system for the Gwich’in language was later developed in the 1960s to support literacy, education, and long-term language preservation efforts within the community of Arctic Village.

== Geography ==
Arctic Village is located at 68°7′19″N 145°31′40″W (68.121828, -145.527686), on the east fork of the Chandalar River, about a hundred miles north of Fort Yukon. The area consists of flat floodlands near the river, but is mostly wooded hills.

The CDP has a total area of 69.9 square miles (181 km^{2}), of which, 61.71 square miles (159.8 km^{2}) is land and 8.12 square miles (21.0 km^{2}) (11.63%) is water.

== Climate ==
Arctic Village has a subarctic climate (Köppen Dfc). On September 30, 1970, Arctic Village recorded a low temperature of −13 °F (−25 °C), which is the lowest recorded temperature in Alaska in the month of September. Arctic village heats up very quickly during the months of May and June, peaking in July at an average daily high at 68.9 °F (20.5 °C), while temperatures start to fall rapidly by the end of July, and even more so during the months of August and September. Summer temperatures are surprisingly mild considering its location North of 68 degrees latitude.

Climate data for Arctic Village, Alaska
Month	Jan	Feb	Mar	Apr	May	Jun	Jul	Aug	Sep	Oct	Nov	Dec	Year
Record high °F (°C)	38 (3)	28 (−2)	43 (6)	64 (18)	77 (25)	89 (32)	87 (31)	78 (26)	72 (22)	42 (6)	40 (4)	49 (9)	89 (32)
Mean daily maximum °F (°C)	−13.3 (−25.2)	−6.2 (−21.2)	13.0 (−10.6)	29.9 (−1.2)	49.6 (9.8)	64.8 (18.2)	68.9 (20.5)	59.7 (15.4)	42.0 (5.6)	20.9 (−6.2)	−1.1 (−18.4)	−6.5 (−21.4)	26.8 (−2.9)
Daily mean °F (°C)	−15.9 (−26.6)	−18.3 (−27.9)	−2.1 (−18.9)	14.1 (−9.9)	38.3 (3.5)	54.5 (12.5)	57.8 (14.3)	49.1 (9.5)	32.4 (0.2)	11.0 (−11.7)	−10.5 (−23.6)	−12.5 (−24.7)	16.5 (−8.6)
Mean daily minimum °F (°C)	−34.6 (−37.0)	−25.4 (−31.9)	−17.1 (−27.3)	−1.8 (−18.8)	26.9 (−2.8)	44.1 (6.7)	46.6 (8.1)	38.5 (3.6)	22.8 (−5.1)	1.0 (−17.2)	−19.9 (−28.8)	−22.4 (−30.2)	4.9 (−15.1)
Record low °F (°C)	−67 (−55)	−64 (−53)	−62 (−52)	−43 (−42)	−21 (−29)	24 (−4)	27 (−3)	17 (−8)	−13 (−25)	−35 (−37)	−56 (−49)	−57 (−49)	−67 (−55)
Average precipitation inches (mm)	0.44 (11)	0.26 (6.6)	0.41 (10)	0.23 (5.8)	0.61 (15)	1.41 (36)	1.68 (43)	1.42 (36)	1.38 (35)	0.60 (15)	0.45 (11)	0.40 (10)	9.29 (234.4)
Average snowfall inches (cm)	4.4 (11)	4.4 (11)	6.4 (16)	4.0 (10)	2.3 (5.8)	1.5 (3.8)	0.0 (0.0)	0.1 (0.25)	4.7 (12)	8.0 (20)	6.7 (17)	6.8 (17)	49.3 (123.85)
Source: WRCC

== Demographics ==
Historical population
Census	Pop.	Note	%±
1910	40		—
1930	40		—
1940	24		−40.0%
1950	53		120.8%
1960	110		107.5%
1970	85		−22.7%
1980	111		30.6%
1990	96		−13.5%
2000	152		58.3%
2010	152		0.0%
2020	151		−0.7%
U.S. Decennial Census

Arctic Village first appeared on the 1910 U.S. Census as the unincorporated village of "Arctic." It did not appear on the 1920 census. It returned as "Arctic" from 1930 through 1960. In 1970, it then returned under its present name of Arctic Village. It was made a census-designated place (CDP) in 1980. Curiously, it reported the same population in 1910 and 1930 (40 residents), and in 2000 and 2010 it reported the same population of 152.

As of the census of 2000, there were 152 (or 123?) people, 52 households, and 30 families residing in the CDP. The population density was 2.5 inhabitants per square mile (0.97/km^{2}). There were 67 housing units at an average density of 1.1/sq mi (0.42/km^{2}). The racial makeup of the CDP was 7.89% White, 86.18% Native American, and 5.92% from two or more races. 0.66% of the population were Hispanic or Latino of any race.

There were 52 households, out of which 44.2% had children under the age of 18 living with them, 25.0% were married couples living together, 21.2% had a female householder with no husband present, and 40.4% were non-families. 32.7% of all households were made up of individuals, and 3.8% had someone living alone who was 65 years of age or older. The average household size was 2.92 and the average family size was 3.58.

In the CDP, the population was spread out, with 41.4% under the age of 18, 9.9% from 18 to 24, 28.9% from 25 to 44, 17.8% from 45 to 64, and 2.0% who were 65 years of age or older. The median age was 24 years. For every 100 females, there were 114.1 males. For every 100 females age 18 and over, there were 128.2 males.

The median income for a household in the CDP was $20,250, and the median income for a family was $19,000. Males had a median income of $21,875 versus $10,000 for females. The per capita income for the CDP was $10,761. About 30.8% of families and 46.3% of the population were below the poverty line, including 53.1% of those under the age of eighteen and none of those 65 or over.

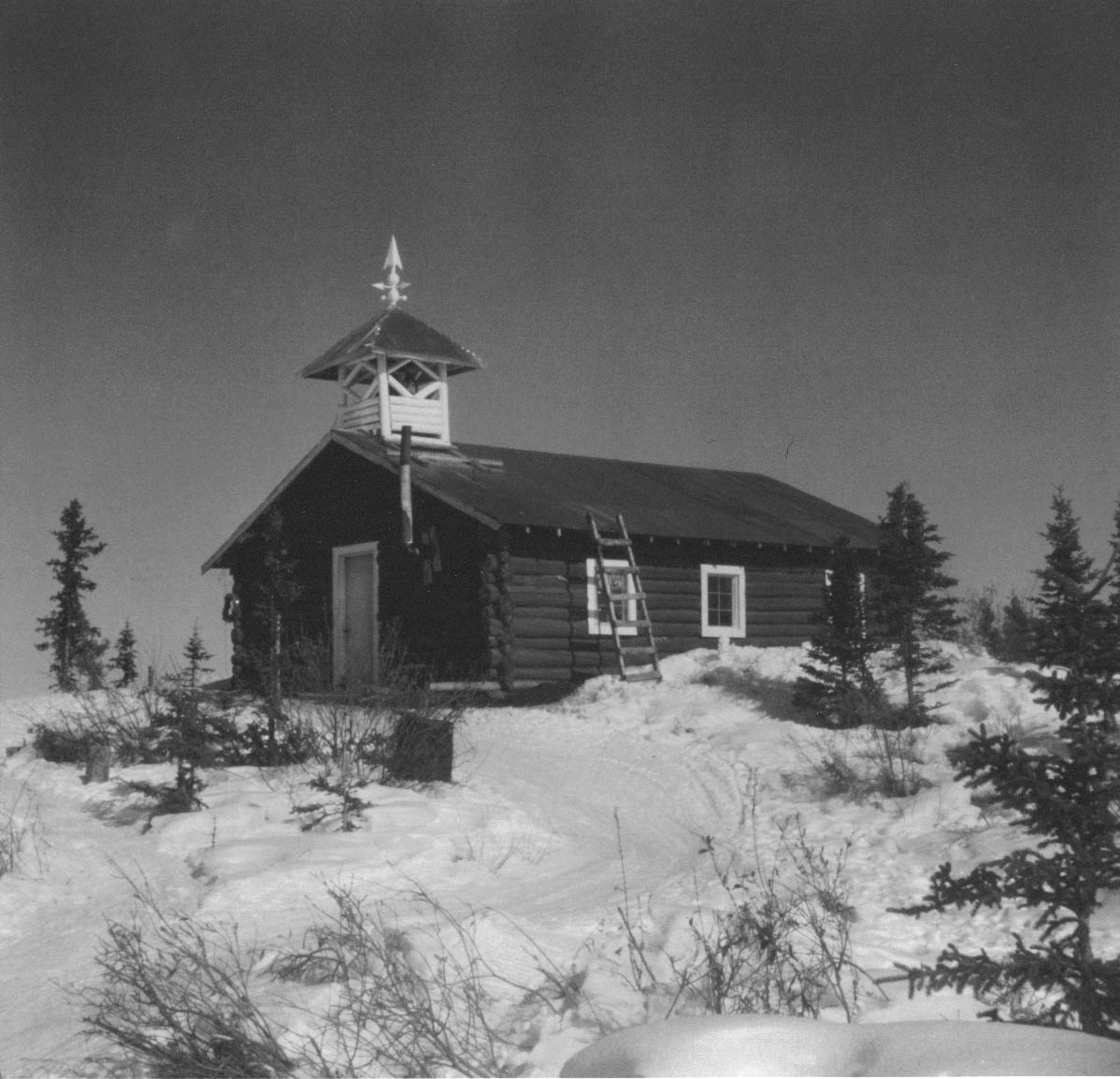
Episcopal church at Arctic Village

== Education ==
Yukon Flats School District operates the Arctic Village School.

== Politics ==
As of 2019, David Smith Jr. was the second tribal chief of Arctic Village; he opposes oil drilling because of the impact on caribou.

== In popular culture ==
=== Literature ===
- J. C. Hutchins' 7th Son, Book 2, Deceit features Arctic Village as a location containing a clue concerning the antagonist's plans.
- Erin Hunter's book Seekers: The Last Wilderness features Arctic Village as a setting in the book. This is where Ujurak is healed by a native and is also captured by a senator.
