= Sheenjek River =

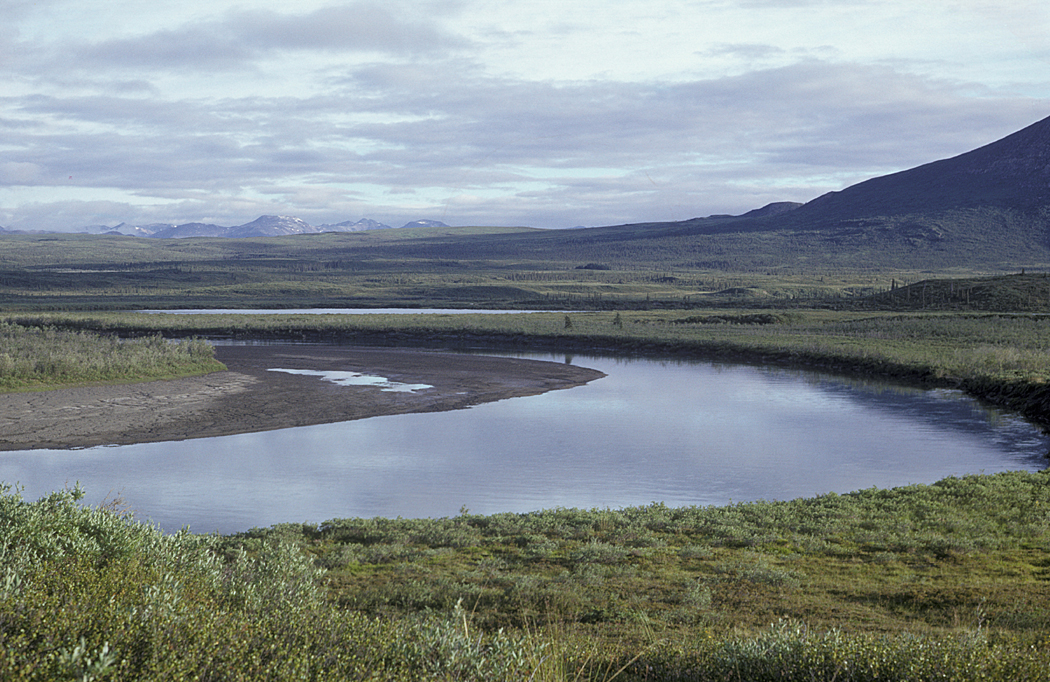
- Flowing through Yukon Flats National Wildlife Refuge

- Location of the mouth of the Sheenjek River in Alaska

Location
- Country: United States
- State: Alaska
- District: North Slope Borough, Yukon–Koyukuk Census Area

Physical characteristics
- Source: Brooks Range
  - location: slightly south of the Continental Divide, North Slope Borough
  - coordinates: 69°01′53″N 144°00′40″W
  - elevation: 6,079 ft (1,853 m)
- Mouth: Porcupine River
  - location: 23 miles (37 km) northeast of Fort Yukon, Yukon Flats National Wildlife Refuge
  - coordinates: 66°44′23″N 144°34′01″W
  - elevation: 446 ft (136 m)
- Length: 200 mi (320 km)

National Wild and Scenic River
- Type: Wild 191.0 miles (307.4 km)
- Designated: December 2, 1980

The Sheenjek River is a 200-mile (320 km) tributary of the Porcupine River in the U.S. state of Alaska. It begins in the eastern part of the Brooks Range and flows southward to meet the larger river northeast of Fort Yukon.

Its name derives from the Gwich'in word "khiinjik," meaning "dog-salmon river"." Explorer J.H. Turner called it the Salmon River.

In the United States, the geographic location most remote from human trails, roads, or settlements is found here, at the headwaters of the Sheenjek River.

== Boating ==
The Sheenjek is suitable for boating by wide variety of watercraft between June and late September. The upper river is rated mostly Class II (medium) on the International Scale of River Difficulty, while the lower half of the river is Class I (easy). However, just after rainstorms, the river can suddenly rise and become more difficult.

Dangers on the upper river include shallow, extremely braided channels, and aufeis. Overhanging vegetation and submerged logs pose risks along the entire course, as do bears along the lower reaches in late summer and early fall.

== See also ==
- List of rivers of Alaska
