= Yukon–Kuskokwim Delta =

River delta in Alaska

Coordinates: 61°N 164°W

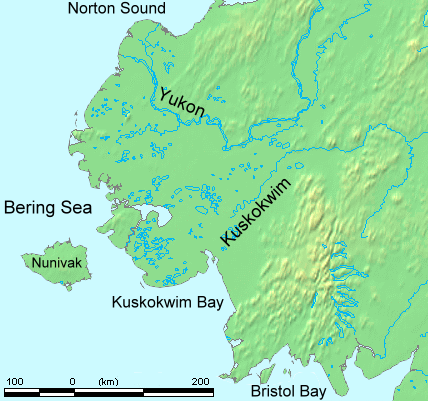
Yukon–Kuskokwim Delta on the west coast of Alaska

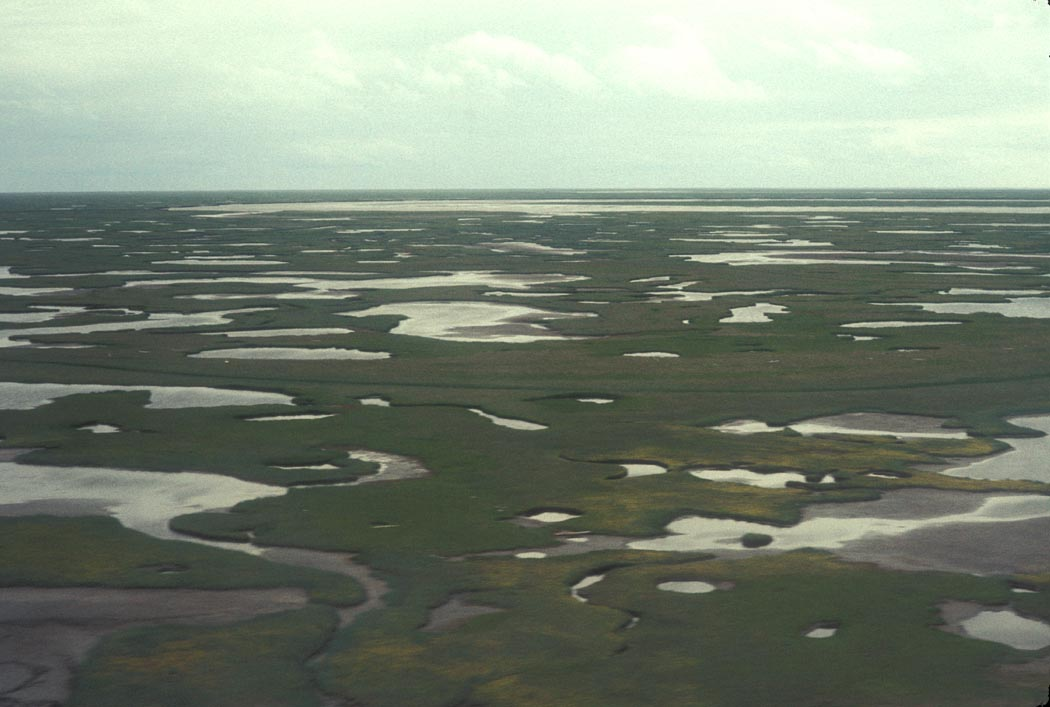
Aerial view of Kuskokwim Delta wetlands

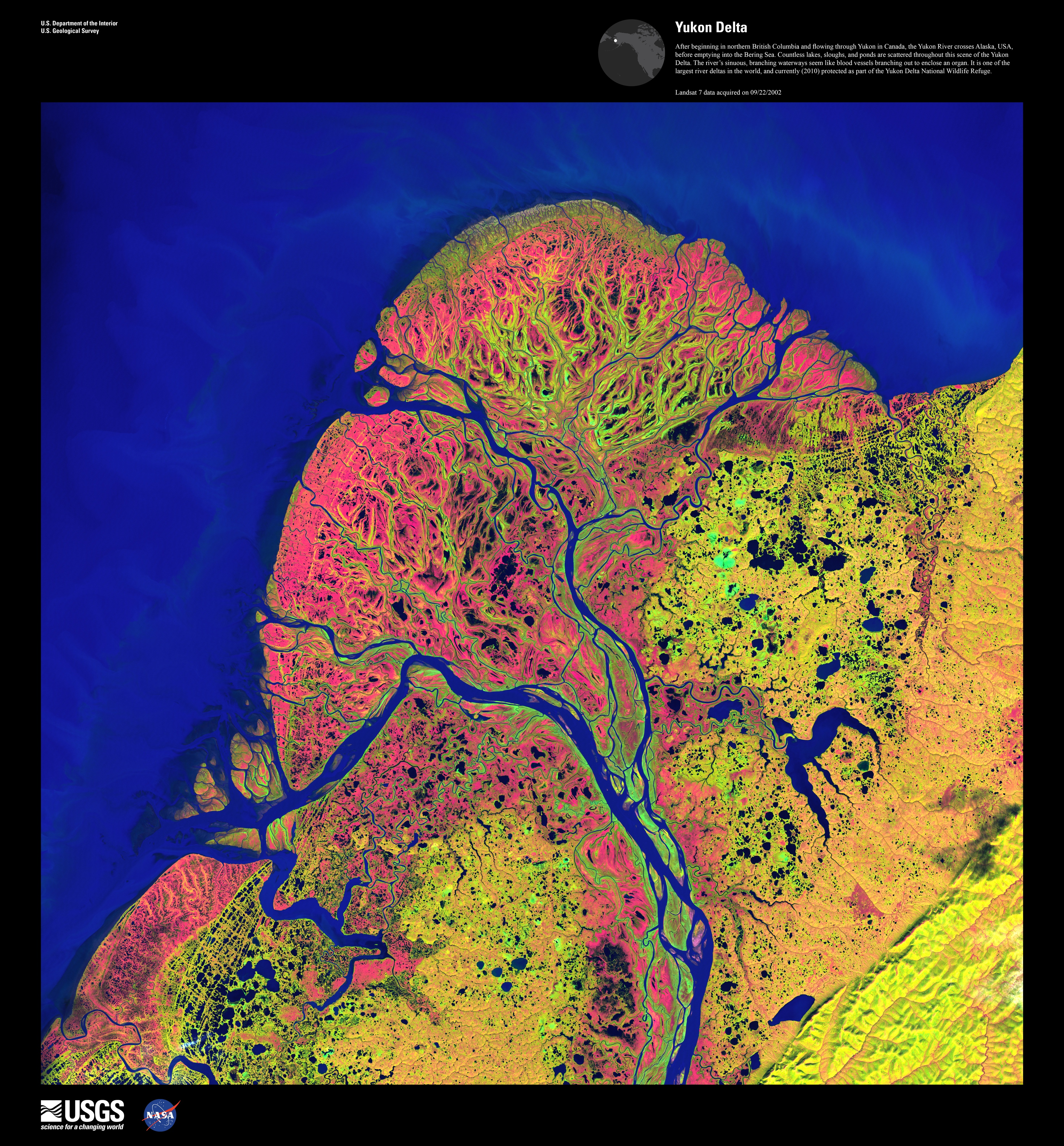
Yukon River Delta: False color satellite image from the NASA / USGA "Earth as Art" collection

The Yukon–Kuskokwim Delta is a river delta located where the Yukon and Kuskokwim rivers empty into the Bering Sea on the west coast of the U.S. state of Alaska. At approximately 129,500 square kilometers (50,000 mi^{2}) in size, it is one of the largest deltas in the world. It is larger than the Mississippi River Delta (which varies between 32,400 and 122,000 square kilometers or 12,500 and 47,100 sq mi); it is comparable in size to the entire U.S. state of Louisiana (135,700 square kilometers or 52,400 sq mi). The delta, which consists mainly of tundra, is protected as part of the Yukon Delta National Wildlife Refuge.

The delta has approximately 25,000 residents. 85% of these are Alaska Natives: Yupik and Athabaskan peoples. The main population center and service hub is the city of Bethel, with an estimated population of around 6,219 (as of 2011). Bethel is surrounded by 49 smaller villages, with the largest villages consisting of over 1000 people. Most residents live a traditional subsistence lifestyle of hunting, fishing, and gathering. More than 30 percent have cash incomes well below the federal poverty threshold.

The area has virtually no roads; travel is by bush plane, or riverboats in summer and snowmachines in winter.

Bethel is the location of the Yukon Kuskokwim Correctional Center.

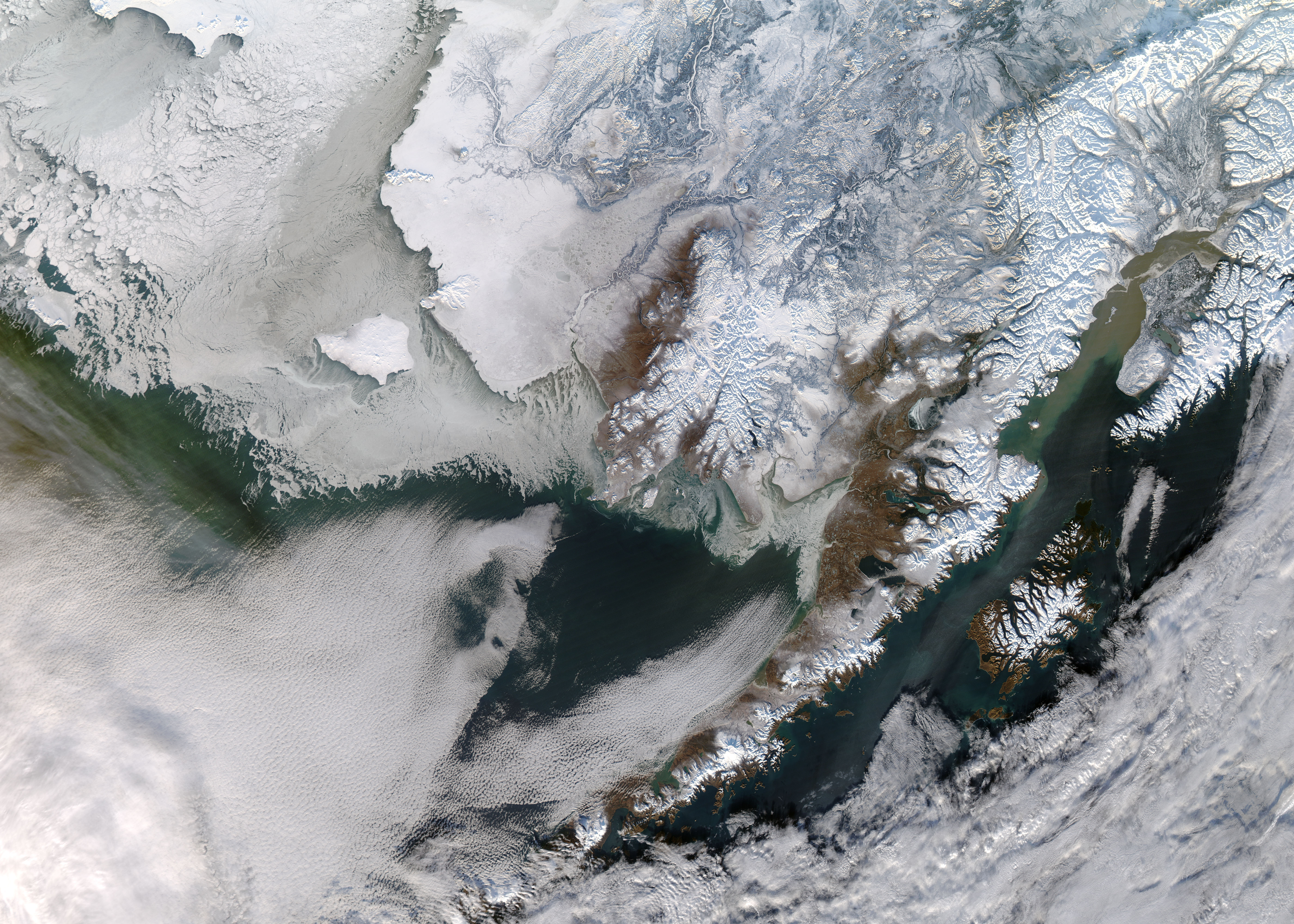
MODIS image of the delta.

Satellite image of the last portion of the Yukon Delta (itself a portion of the Yukon–Kuskokwim Delta)
