= Pilot Station, Alaska =

Pilot Station Tuutalgaq
- City
- Location in Alaska
- Coordinates: 61°56′10″N 162°53′0″W
- Country: United States
- State: Alaska
- Census Area: Kusilvak
- Incorporated: October 6, 1969

Government
  - Mayor: Nicky Myers
  - State senator: Donny Olson (D)
  - State rep.: Neal Foster (D)

Area
  - Total: 1.88 sq mi (4.87 km^{2})
  - Land: 1.61 sq mi (4.16 km^{2})
  - Water: 0.27 sq mi (0.71 km^{2})
- Elevation: 33 ft (10 m)

Population (2020)
  - Total: 615
  - Density: 383.0/sq mi (147.86/km^{2})
- Time zone: UTC-9 (Alaska (AKST))
  - Summer (DST): UTC-8 (AKDT)
- ZIP code: 99650
- Area code: 907
- FIPS code: 02-60750
- GNIS feature ID: 1407993

Pilot Station (Central Yupik: Tuutalgaq) is a city in Kusilvak Census Area, Alaska, United States. The population was 615 at the 2020 census, up from 568 in 2010, and up from 550 in 2000.

== Geography ==
Pilot Station is located at 61°56′10″N 162°53′0″W (61.936050, -162.883403), on the northern bank of the lower Yukon River, approximately eighty miles ('as the crow flies') from the Bering Sea.

According to the United States Census Bureau, the city has a total area of 2.3 square miles (6.0 km^{2}), of which 1.7 square miles (4.4 km^{2}) is land and 0.6 square miles (1.6 km^{2}) (25.55%) is water.

== Demographics ==
Historical population
Census	Pop.	Note	%±
1890	103		—
1920	145		—
1930	87		−40.0%
1940	39		−55.2%
1950	52		33.3%
1960	219		321.2%
1970	290		32.4%
1980	325		12.1%
1990	463		42.5%
2000	550		18.8%
2010	568		3.3%
2020	615		8.3%
U.S. Decennial Census

Pilot Station first appeared on the 1890 U.S. Census as the unincorporated Eskimo (Yup'ik) village of "Ankahchagmiut." It did not report again until 1920, then as Pilot Station. It formally incorporated in 1969.

=== 2020 census ===
As of the 2020 census, Pilot Station had a population of 615, with 152 households and 73 families. The population density was 326.2 inhabitants per square mile (125.9/km^{2}). There were 152 housing units at an average density of 74.7 per square mile (28.8/km^{2}).

The median age was 24.4 years. 41.5% of residents were under the age of 18 and 4.9% were 65 years of age or older. There were 299 females and 316 males; for every 100 females there were 105.7 males, and for every 100 females age 18 and over there were 102.2 males age 18 and over.

0.0% of residents lived in urban areas, while 100.0% lived in rural areas.

There were 152 households in Pilot Station, of which 61.8% had children under the age of 18 living in them. Of all households, 34.2% were married-couple households, 21.7% were households with a male householder and no spouse or partner present, and 30.3% were households with a female householder and no spouse or partner present. About 17.1% of all households were made up of individuals and 2.6% had someone living alone who was 65 years of age or older.

Of the 152 housing units, 0.0% were vacant. The homeowner vacancy rate was 0.0% and the rental vacancy rate was 0.0%.

Racial composition as of the 2020 census
Race	Number	Percent
White	8	1.3%
Black or African American	2	0.3%
American Indian and Alaska Native	590	95.9%
Asian	2	0.3%
Native Hawaiian and Other Pacific Islander	0	0.0%
Some other race	0	0.0%
Two or more races	13	2.1%
Hispanic or Latino (of any race)	0	0.0%

=== 2000 census ===
{The median household income was $31,071 and the median family income was $27,411. Males had a median income of $27,917 and females $16,667. The per capita income was $7,311. About 25.3% of families and 28.7% of the population were below the poverty line, including 26.0% of those under age 18 and 28.1% of those age 65 or over.} [2000 data]

== Education ==
K-12 students attend Pilot Station School, operated by the Lower Yukon School District.
