= Fishing Branch =

Stream in Bates County, Missouri, U.S.

Coordinates: 38.35392°N 94.21609°W

Fishing Branch is a stream in Bates County in the U.S. state of Missouri.

Fishing Branch was named for the fact it was a favorite fishing spot.

== See also ==
- List of rivers of Missouri
