= Chandalar River =

River in the United States of America

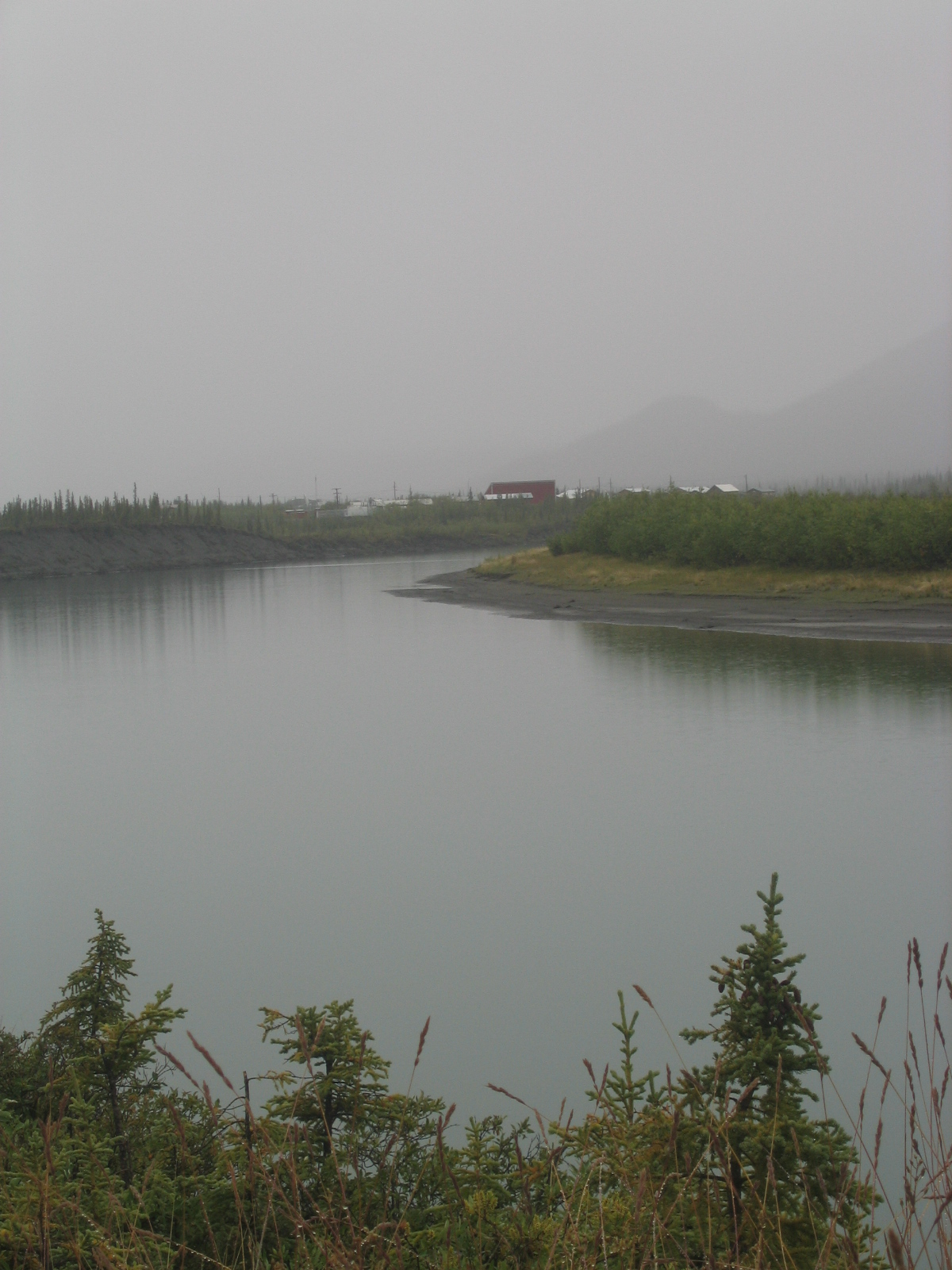
- East Fork of the Chandalar River, at Arctic Village

- Location of the mouth of the Chandalar River in Alaska
- Native name: T'eedrinjik (Gwichʼin)

Location
- Country: United States
- State: Alaska
- Census Area: Yukon–Koyukuk

Physical characteristics
- Source: confluence of the river's north and middle forks
  - location: southeastern Brooks Range, 23 miles (37 km) south-southeast of Chandalar
  - coordinates: 67°10′13″N 148°17′50″W
  - elevation: 1,203 ft (367 m)
- Mouth: Yukon River
  - location: 20 miles (32 km) northwest of Fort Yukon, Yukon Flats National Wildlife Refuge
  - coordinates: 66°36′33″N 146°00′09″W
  - elevation: 387 ft (118 m)
- Length: 100 mi (160 km)
- Basin size: 9,330 sq mi (24,200 km^{2})
- Discharge
  - location: near Venetie
  - average: 5,007 cu ft/s (141.8 m^{3}/s)
  - maximum: 62,800 cu ft/s (1,780 m^{3}/s)

The Chandalar River (T'eedriinjik in Gwich'in) is a 100-mile (160 km) tributary of the Yukon River in the U.S. state of Alaska. Its French name was "Gens de Large" or "nomadic people" which when written in English from its local pronunciation evolved into "Chandalar." Its peak flow, recorded by the United States Geological Survey (USGS) between 1964 and 1974 at a stream gauge at Venetie, was 62,800 cubic feet per second (1,780 m^{3}/s) on June 9, 1968.

The Chandalar River main stem begins at the confluence of the North Fork Chandalar River and the Middle Fork Chandalar River and flows generally southeast through the state's northern interior southeast of the Philip Smith Mountains of the Brooks Range. The Chandalar enters the Yukon River 20 miles (32 km) northwest of Fort Yukon.

In 2015 the Chandalar became federally recognized by the United States Board on Geographic Names as their indigenous Gwichʼin names Teedriinjik River meaning "shimmering river" and Ch'idriinjik River meaning "heart river". The names had been in use for over a thousand years by the Athabaskans.

== Major tributaries ==
North Fork Chandalar River, 104 miles (167 km) long, begins near Atigun Pass in the Brooks Range and flows generally southeast through Chandalar Lake to meet the Middle Fork and form the main stem. At the North Fork, headwaters is a flat valley known as Chandalar shelf just east of the Dalton Highway, where caribou are known to winter.

The 102-mile (164 km) Middle Fork Chandalar River heads up in the Philip Smith Mountains east of Atigun Pass. It flows generally south from the mountains to join the North Fork.

East Fork Chandalar River, 175 miles (282 km) long, starts near the Romanzof Mountains in the eastern Brooks Range. From there, it flows generally southwest past Arctic Village to enter the main stem upstream of Venetie.

West Fork Chandalar River, a 24-mile (39 km) tributary of the North Fork Chandalar River, flows east from mountainous terrain east of Coldfoot. It joins the North Fork 5 miles (8 km) upstream of that stream's confluence with the Middle Fork.

== Climate ==
There is a weather station in the Chandalar Shelf Valley near Atigun Pass. Chandalar Shelf has a subarctic climate (Köppen Dfc), bordering on a tundra climate (Köppen ET).

Climate data for Chandalar Shelf, Alaska, 1991–2020 normals, precip/snowfall 2001-2012: 3250ft (991m)
Month	Jan	Feb	Mar	Apr	May	Jun	Jul	Aug	Sep	Oct	Nov	Dec	Year
Mean daily maximum °F (°C)	0.9 (−17.3)	4.6 (−15.2)	8.8 (−12.9)	23.8 (−4.6)	40.6 (4.8)	57.6 (14.2)	57.7 (14.3)	51.6 (10.9)	39.3 (4.1)	20.0 (−6.7)	8.5 (−13.1)	3.5 (−15.8)	26.4 (−3.1)
Daily mean °F (°C)	−4.8 (−20.4)	−1.8 (−18.8)	1.3 (−17.1)	15.5 (−9.2)	33.7 (0.9)	49.0 (9.4)	51.0 (10.6)	44.2 (6.8)	32.0 (0.0)	14.2 (−9.9)	2.6 (−16.3)	−2.3 (−19.1)	19.6 (−6.9)
Mean daily minimum °F (°C)	−10.6 (−23.7)	−8.2 (−22.3)	−6.2 (−21.2)	7.3 (−13.7)	26.8 (−2.9)	40.3 (4.6)	44.3 (6.8)	36.8 (2.7)	24.8 (−4.0)	8.5 (−13.1)	−3.3 (−19.6)	−8.1 (−22.3)	12.7 (−10.7)
Average precipitation inches (mm)	0.73 (19)	0.84 (21)	0.31 (7.9)	0.65 (17)	0.91 (23)	1.37 (35)	2.24 (57)	1.86 (47)	1.39 (35)	1.10 (28)	0.67 (17)	0.85 (22)	12.92 (328.9)
Average snowfall inches (cm)	13.1 (33)	16.2 (41)	6.5 (17)	14.9 (38)	6.9 (18)	0.8 (2.0)	trace	0.1 (0.25)	2.7 (6.9)	17.1 (43)	13.6 (35)	13.6 (35)	105.5 (269.15)
Source 1: NOAA
Source 2: XMACIS2 (precipitation & snowfall)

== Recreation ==
Although the lower river can be fished for northern pike, sheefish, and salmon, the upper river, its tributaries, headwaters, and nearby lakes offer "the most exciting fishing possibilities". The main sportfishing species in the basin are northern pike, Arctic grayling, charr, and lake trout.

Anglers and hunters typically enter the region by airplane or, in winter, by snowmobile. It is possible for experienced boaters to float and fish the river system in rafts or kayaks. Hazards include shallows and rapids. There are no public campgrounds or other facilities; however, there is a fishing lodge at Chandalar Lake.

== Gallery ==
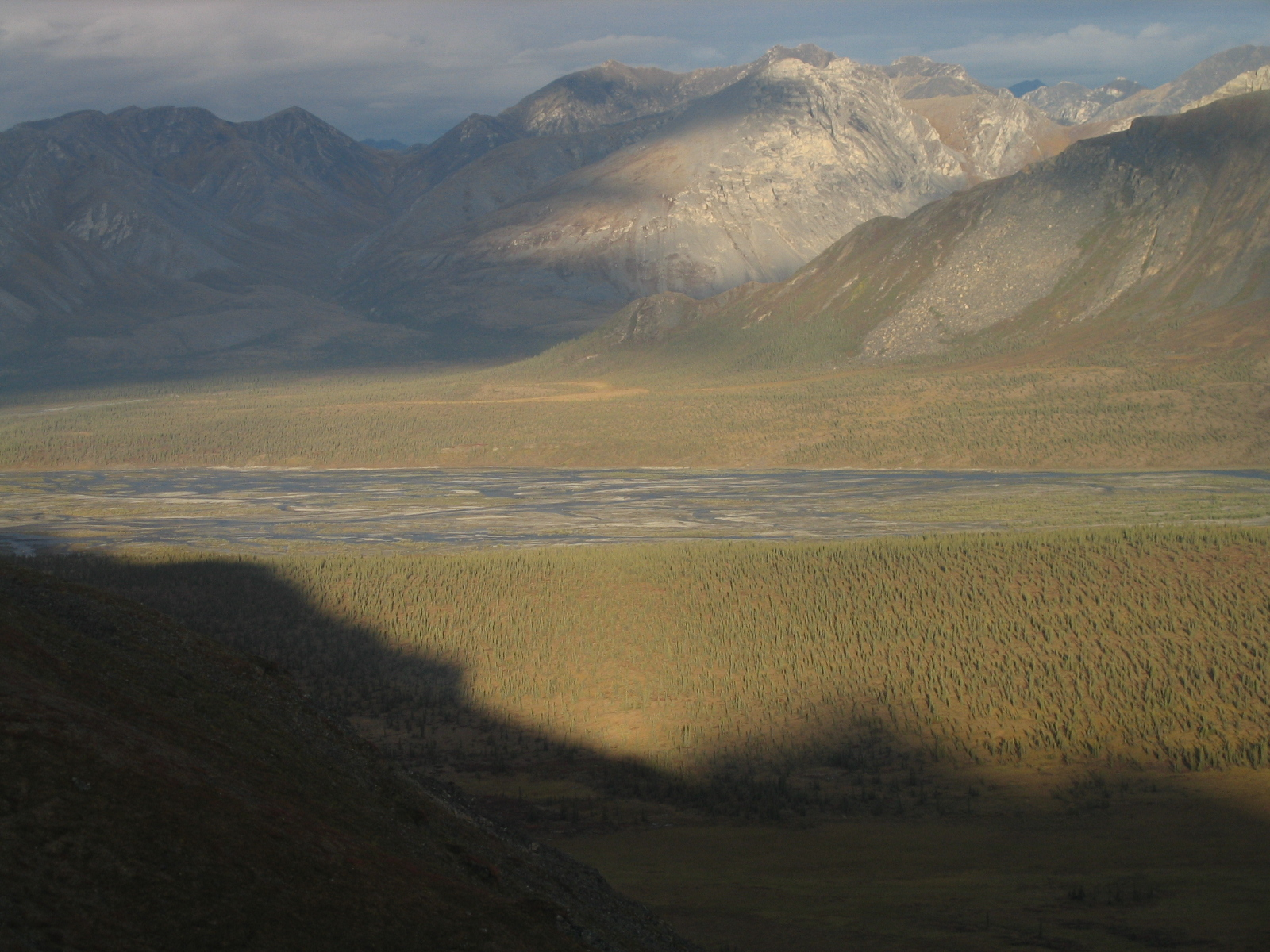
Sunrise over the East Fork of the Chandalar River, in the Brooks Range

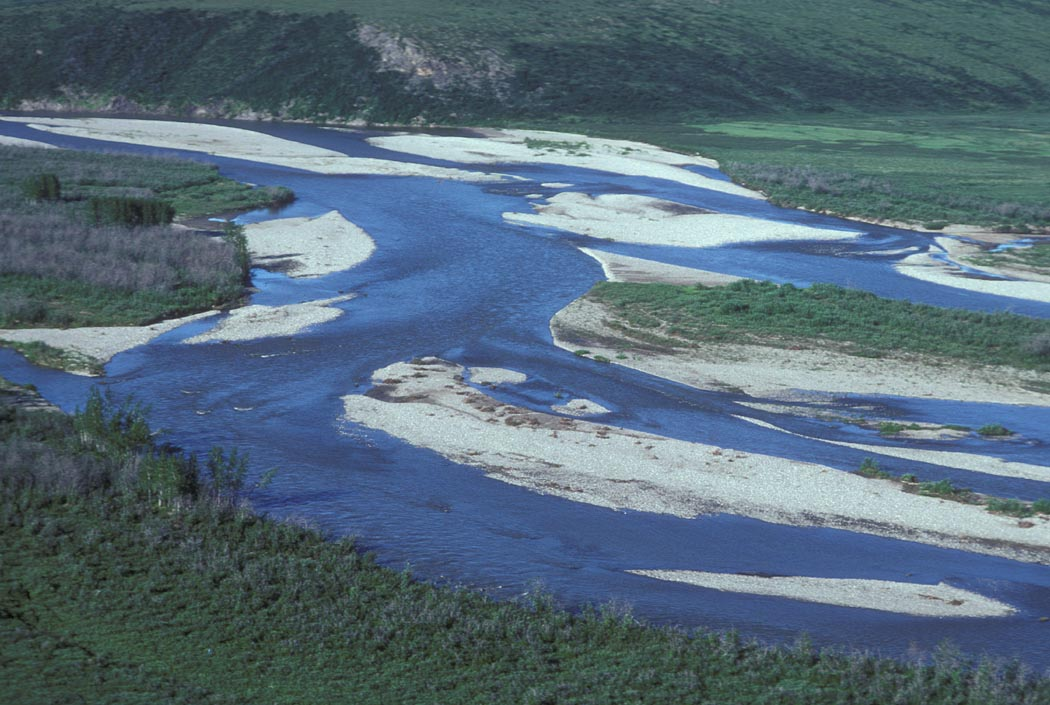
Chandalar River in summer

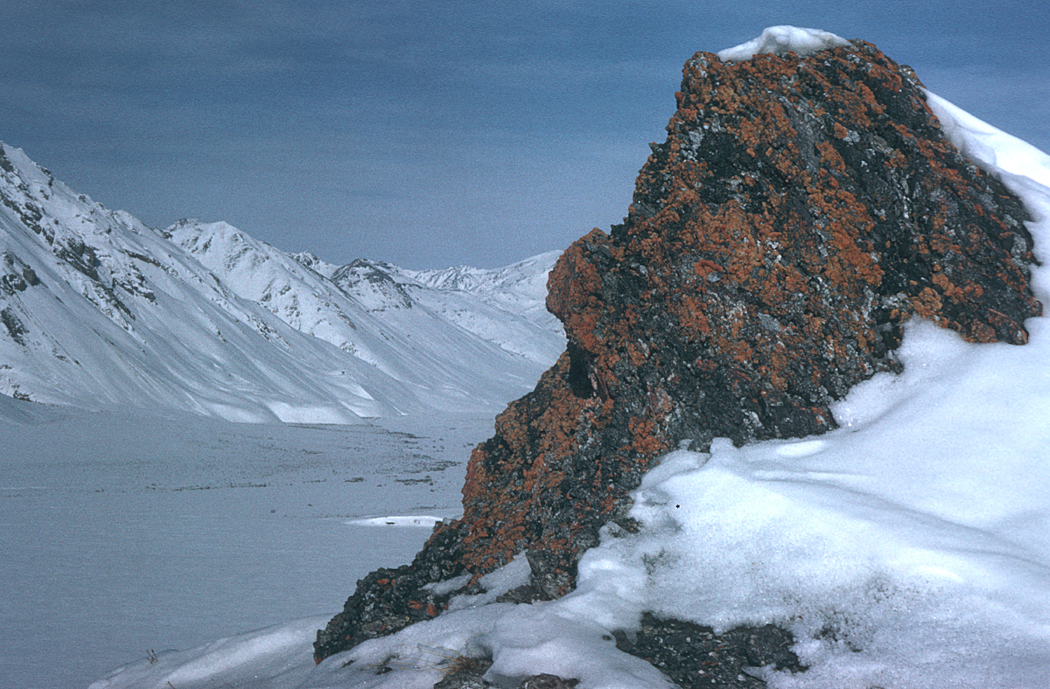
Chandalar River in winter

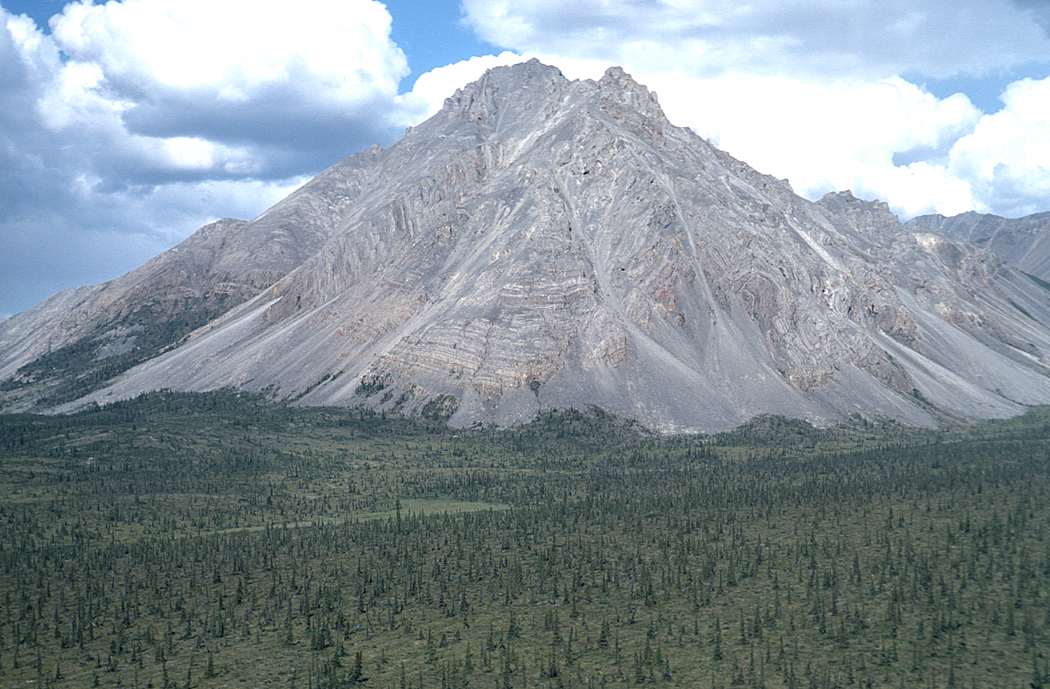
Mountain in the Chandalar River Valley

== See also ==
- List of rivers of Alaska

== Works cited ==
- Orth, Donald J.; United States Geological Survey (1971) [1967]. Dictionary of Alaska Place Names: Geological Survey Professional Paper 567 (PDF). University of Alaska Fairbanks. Archived from the original (PDF) on October 17, 2013 – via United States Government Printing Office.
