= Yukon Delta National Wildlife Refuge =

National Wildlife Refuge in southwestern Alaska

- IUCN category IV (habitat/species management area)
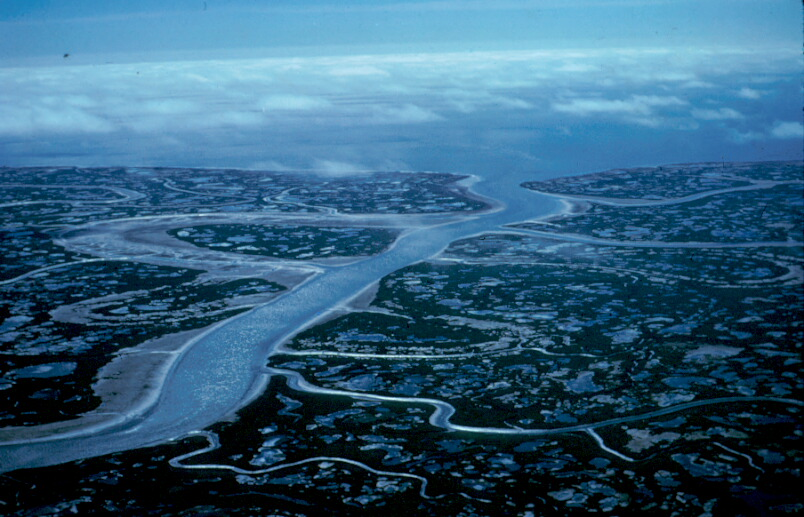
- Brant goose nesting area

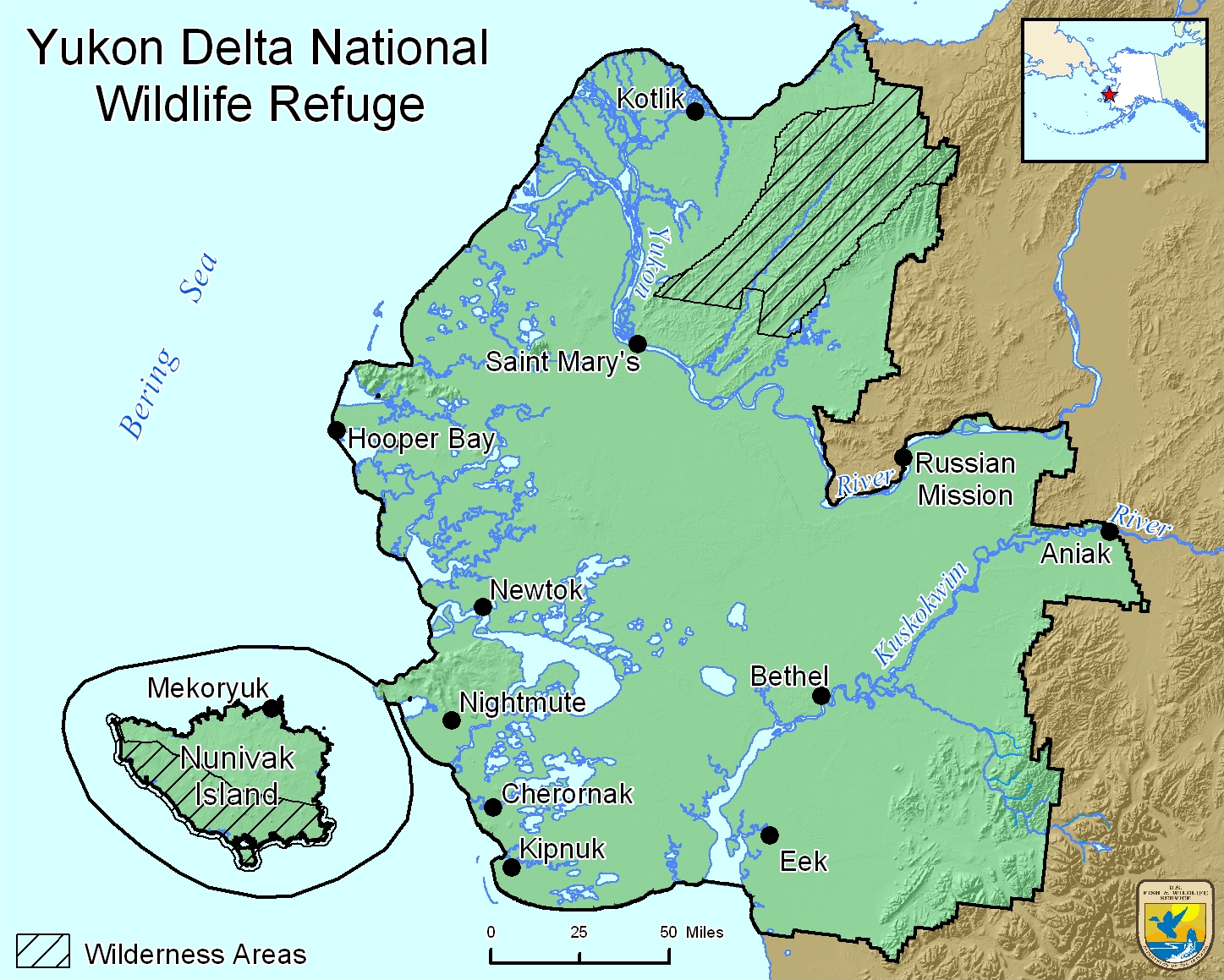
- Yukon Delta National Wildlife Refuge Map
- Location: Alaska, United States
- Nearest city: Bethel, Alaska
- Coordinates: 61.3°N 163.1°W
- Area: 19.16 million acres (77,500 km^{2})
- Established: 1980
- Governing body: U.S. Fish and Wildlife Service
- Website: Yukon Delta NWR

The Yukon Delta National Wildlife Refuge is a United States National Wildlife Refuge covering about 19.16 million acres (77,500 km^{2}) in southwestern Alaska. It is the second-largest National Wildlife Refuge in the country, only slightly smaller than the Arctic National Wildlife Refuge. It is a coastal plain extending to the Bering Sea, covering the delta created by the Yukon and Kuskokwim rivers. The delta includes extensive wetlands near sea level that are often inundated by Bering Sea tides. It is bordered on the east by Wood-Tikchik State Park, the largest state park in the United States. The refuge is administered from offices in Bethel.

U.S. president Theodore Roosevelt first set aside southwestern Alaska refuge lands in 1909. Other lands were added through the years until December 2, 1980, when President Jimmy Carter signed the Alaska National Interest Lands Conservation Act (ANILCA) into law, which created the Yukon Delta National Wildlife Reserve by consolidating existing refuges and adding additional lands. The large islands Nelson and Nunivak are also located within the refuge. In 1968, the Clarence Rhode National Wildlife Range was designated as a National Natural Landmark by the National Park Service.

It is home to about 35 villages and 25,000 people, many of Yup'ik Eskimo origin and dependent on a subsistence lifestyle.

The Andreafsky Wilderness is a wilderness area covering about 1,300,000 acres (5,300 km^{2}) of the NWR. It was designated by the United States Congress in 1980. The Andreafsky River and its East Fork, in the northern section, flow southwest along parallel paths and drain into the Yukon River.

== Wildlife ==
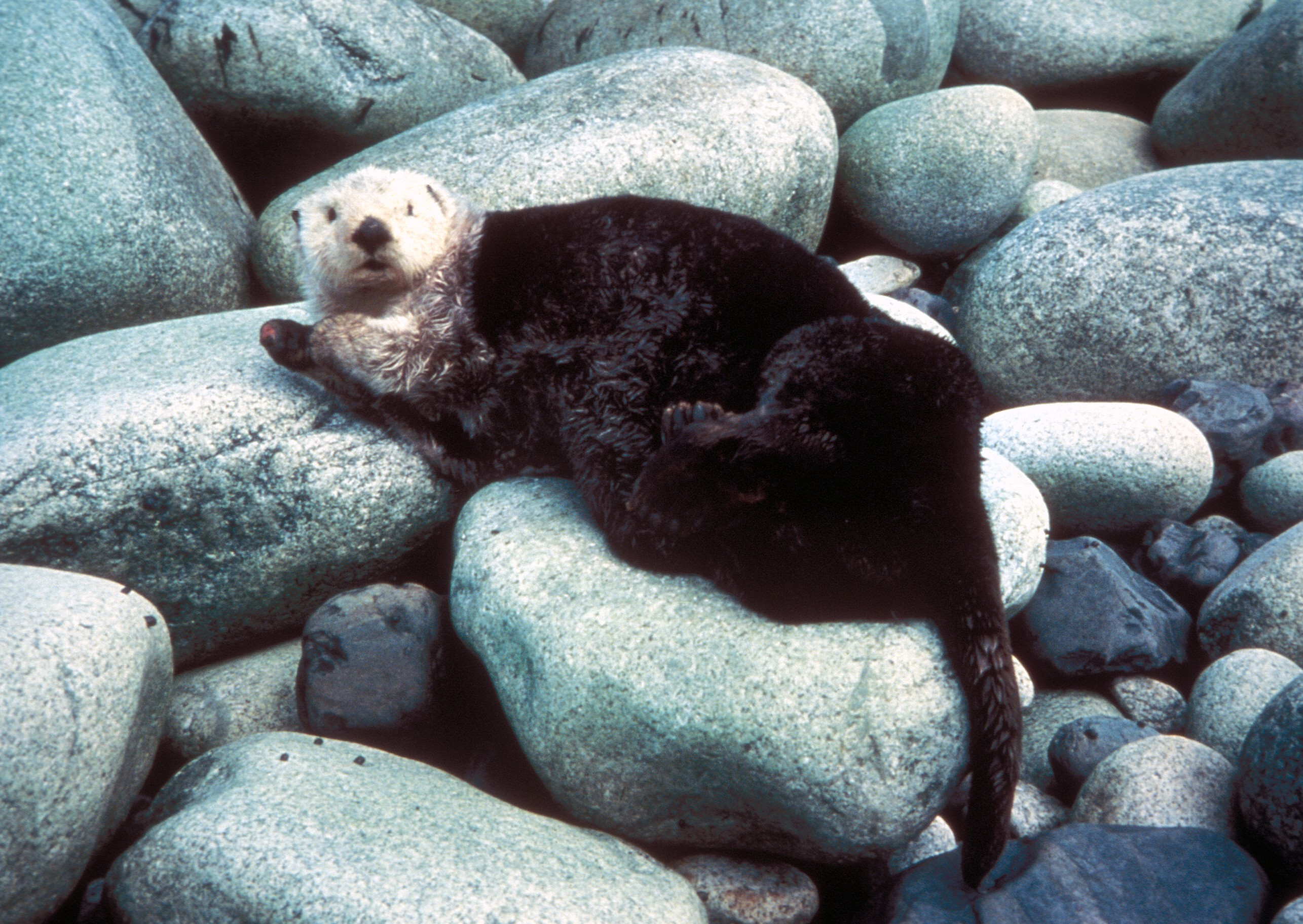
Sea otter in the Yukon Delta National Wildlife Refuge

The refuge's coastal region bordering the Bering Sea is a rich, productive wildlife habitat supporting one of the largest concentrations of water fowl in the world. More than one million ducks and half a million geese use the area for breeding purposes each year, including eider, harlequin duck and emperor goose. There are also very large seasonal concentrations of northern pintail, loon, grebe, tundra swan and cranes. This national wildlife refuge is home to mammalian species such as muskrat, snowshoe hare, brown bear, muskoxen, Dall sheep, moose, black bear, coyote, Canadian lynx, porcupine, beaver, red and Arctic fox, river otter, marten, wolverine, mink, polar bear, and wolf packs. Often trailed by the wolves, some of the 150,000+ Mulchatna caribou herd migrate onto the eastern tundra areas during the fall and winter. Walrus, seals, sea otter and porpoise can be found in the waters as well as Orca, beluga, gray, humpback, bowhead and minke whale.

== See also ==
- List of largest National Wildlife Refuges
- List of largest wilderness areas in the United States
