= Yukon Flats National Wildlife Refuge =

Protected wetland area in the U.S. state of Alaska

- IUCN category IV (habitat/species management area)
- Location within Alaska
- Interactive map of Yukon Flats National Wildlife Refuge
- Location: Interior Alaska, United States
- Nearest city: Fort Yukon, Alaska
- Coordinates: 66°20′00″N 146°00′02″W
- Area: 8,634,512 acres (34,942.63 km^{2})
- Established: December 2, 1980
- Governing body: U.S. Fish and Wildlife Service
- Website: Yukon Flats NWR

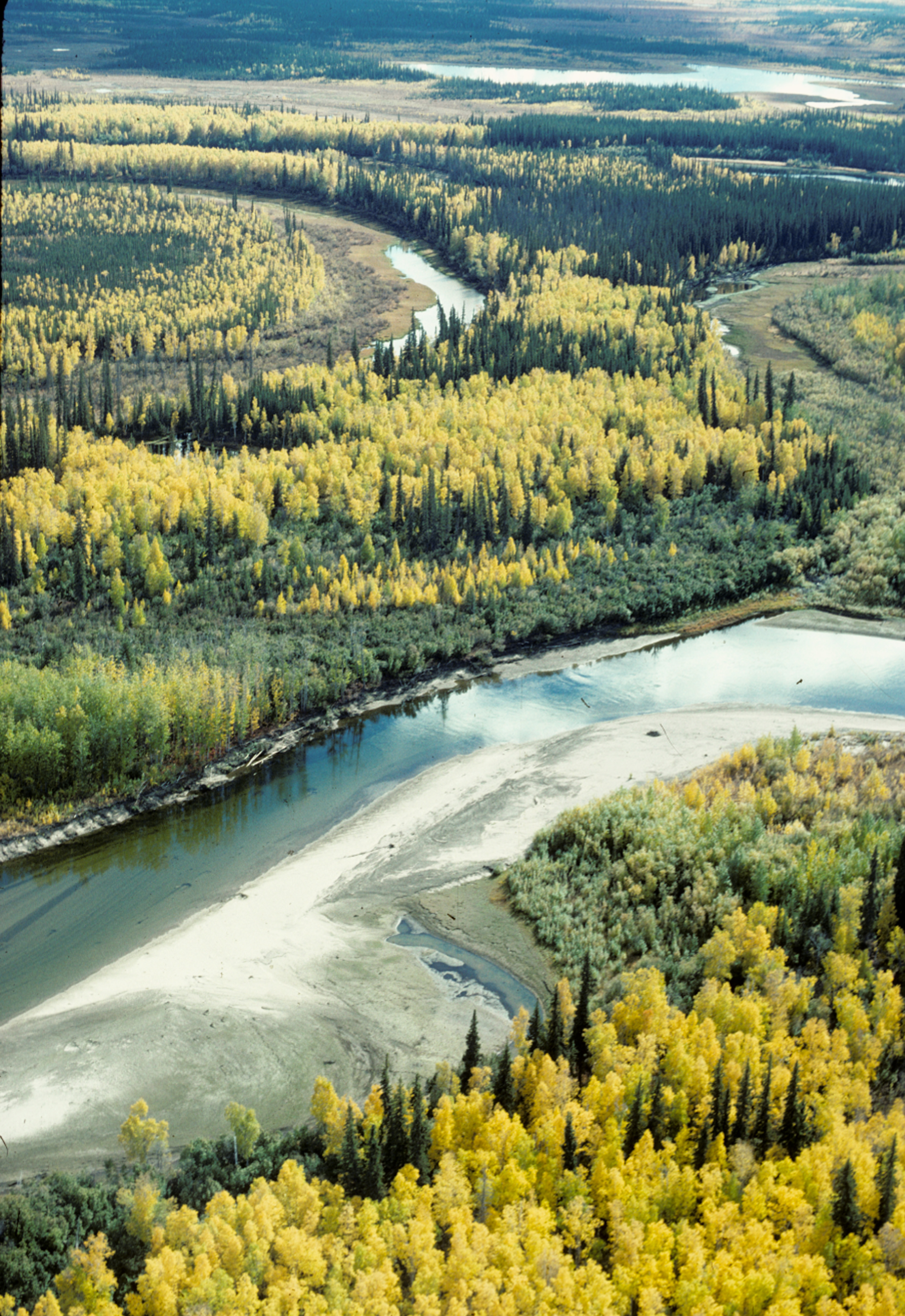
Fall on the Yukon Flats National Wildlife Refuge

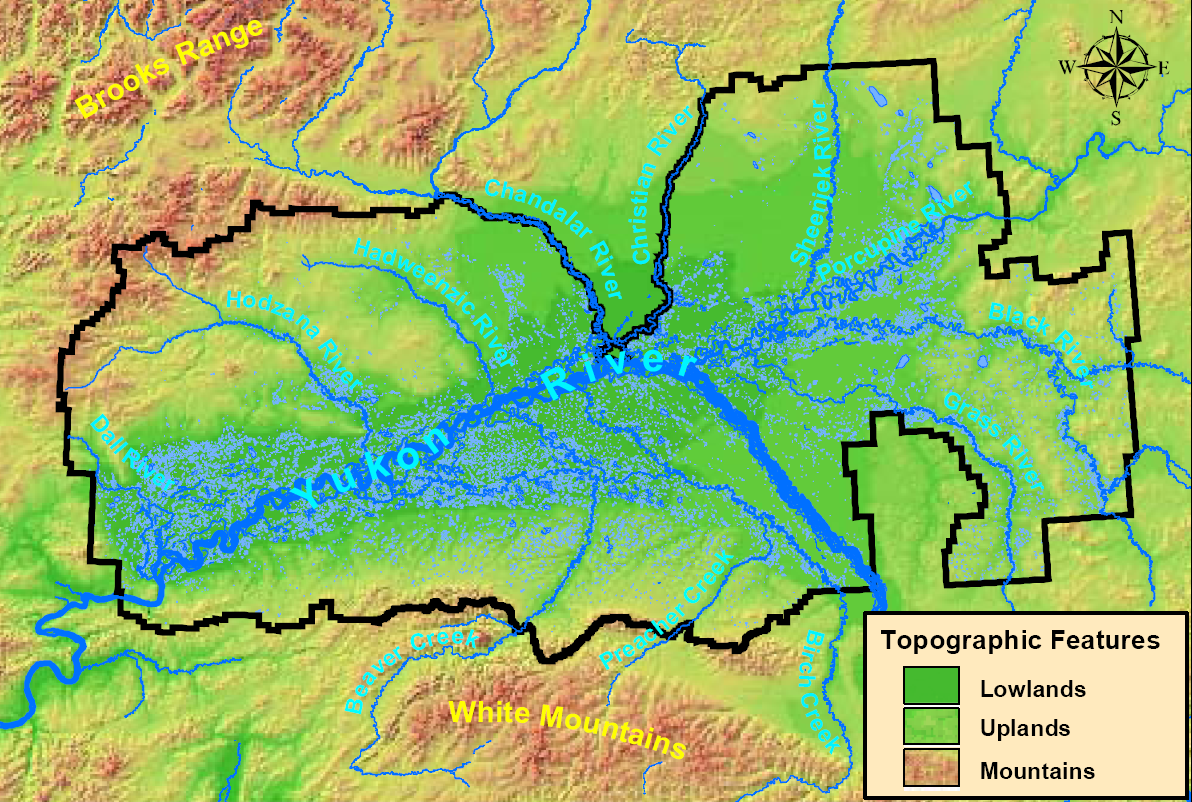
The Yukon Flats National Wildlife Refuge encompasses most of the Yukon Flats.

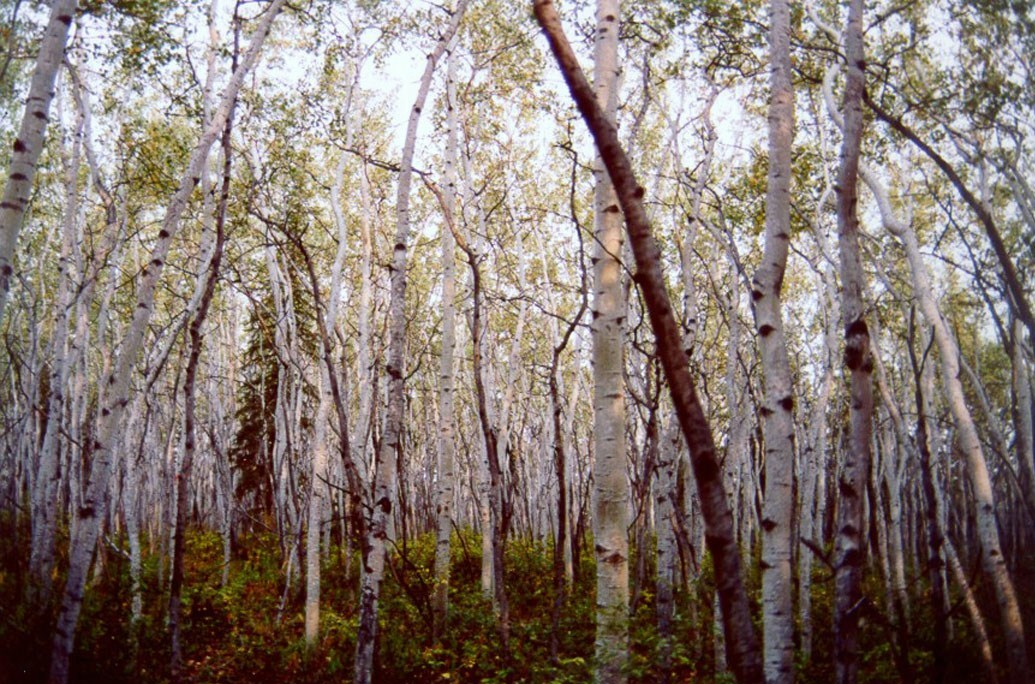
Aspen forest in Yukon Flats National Wildlife Refuge

The Yukon Flats National Wildlife Refuge is a protected wetland area in the state of Alaska, in the U.S. It encompasses most of the Yukon Flats, a vast wetland area centered on the confluence of the Yukon River, Porcupine River, and Chandalar River.

The area is a significant waterfowl breeding ground, and after a proposal to flood the Yukon Flats via a dam on the Yukon River was turned down, the Yukon Flats were deemed worthy of protection.

On 1 December 1978, US President Jimmy Carter designated the Yukon Flats as a National Monument based on the Antiquities Act of 1906. During the Alaska National Interest Lands Conservation Act of December 2, 1980, the area boundaries were changed after political criticism, and the status was downgraded to that of a wildlife refuge. It is the third-largest National Wildlife Refuge in the United States. However, it is less than one-half the size of the two largest, the Arctic National Wildlife Refuge and the Yukon Delta National Wildlife Refuge. The refuge is administered from offices in Fairbanks.

== Fauna ==
This refuge is home to bird and mammalian species such as the Arctic fox, moose, bald eagle, black bear, wolf packs, porcupine, four species of falcon, river otter, golden eagle, red fox, Dall sheep, muskrat, coyote, six species of owl, Canadian lynx, beaver, caribou, mink, wolverine, and brown bear.
