= Trout Creek (Alaska) =

Location
- Country: United States
- State: Alaska
- Census Area: Southeast Fairbanks

Physical characteristics
- Source
  - location: Yukon-Tanana High
  - elevation: 781 feet (238 m)
- Mouth
  - location: Yukon River
  - coordinates: 65°07′17″N 141°39′49″W
- Length: 11 mi (18 km)

Trout Creek is a small tributary of the Yukon River in the U.S. state of Alaska. It is about 11 miles (18 km) long and is located about 27 miles (43 km) northwest of the town of Eagle. In winter, a small cabin at the creek's mouth is a hospitality stop for the Yukon Quest sled dog race.
