= Dog booties =

Coverings for dogs' paws

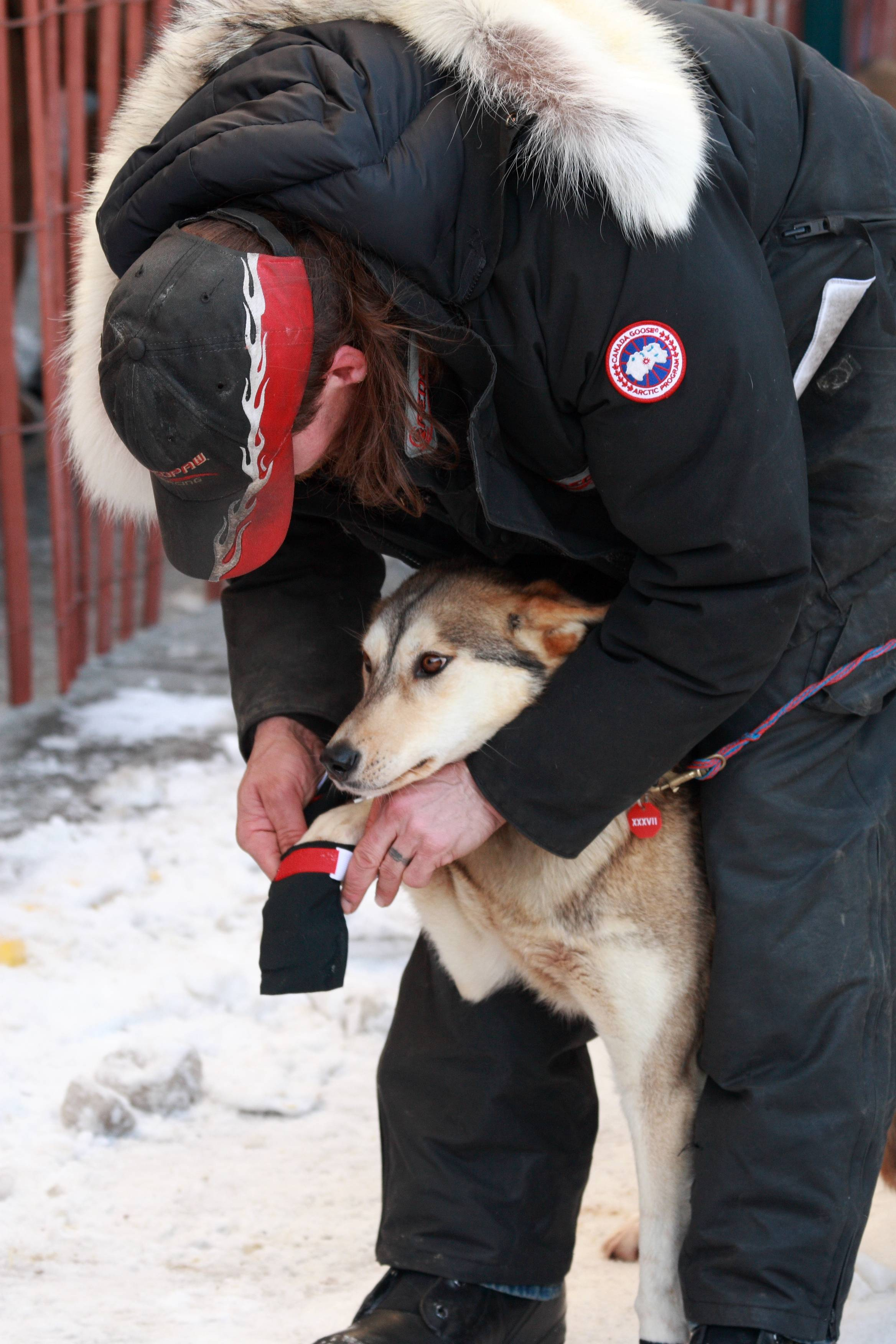
A bootie fitted onto a sled dog's paw

Dog booties, commonly called booties, are rubber, fabric, or plastic coverings for dogs' paws used to protect the animal from cold weather, rough terrain, or injury. They are analogous to human shoes and are most common in sled dog races. Many races require booties as a basic element of dog care. The Yukon Quest Sled Dog Race for example, requires mushers to carry no fewer than eight booties per dog.

Many dogs are resistant to wearing booties, and the velcro straps typically used to secure booties often are inadequate on active dogs. During the Yukon Quest, a musher will change between 2,000 and 3,000 booties during the course of the race. Changing booties is necessary when they become wet or fly off a dog's paws. Sometimes, dog booties are worn for hiking, especially on rocky ground.

Like shoes, booties wear out with use. In long sled dog races or over an extended period of time, booties need to be replaced due to wear.

== Description ==
Dog booties may be made from canvas, nylon, soft leather, fleece or polypropylene. Materials may be suitable for one environment, but not another; for example, while fleece can keep a paw insulated from the snow, it can cause a dog to overheat in hot weather. They are slipped on a dog's foot, like a sock, and tightened via elasticized velcro. They may have rubber soles, preventing the dog from slipping or getting stuck. A dog's back paws are smaller than its front. Therefore, dogs are usually shod with two different-sized pairs of boots.

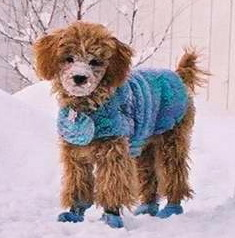
Small dogs such as this poodle, often need protection from extreme weather. Dog booties prevent ice balls from forming between dogs’ toes.

Keeping booties on can be a challenge. It can be difficult to assess how tight the booties should be; if they are too tight, the dog's restriction may be restricted, and if they are too loose, they can fall off, especially if the dog is running. Some dogs may also refuse to wear booties out of discomfort. One way to convince dogs to wear booties is to associate them with something the dog likes, such as food or toys.

== History ==
Inventor Douglas Boyd Buchanan was approached by the Prison Service to design boots for dog feet. The Service's dogs would often cut their feet on broken glass during riots. Boyd's booties were made from neoprene, with rubber soles. Boyd was later asked by Queen Elizabeth II to make booties for her royal corgis, which had been suffering from paw problems.

== Uses ==
=== Companion dogs ===
When in rough terrain, such as hiking with its owner, a dog's paws risk getting cut or worn down, and may be exposed to parasites like ticks. In winter, dogs may gather road salt on their paws, which can poison the dog if it licks its paw afterwards. Dogs walking on hot surfaces may develop blisters on their paws. Sometimes, even indoor floors can be too slippery for dogs. Booties are thus used for all of these purposes, sometimes being included in first aid kits for dogs. They may also be used to aid with applying moisturizer to dry dog paws.

=== Mushing ===
A sled dog with blue booties

Booties are used in mushing to protect a sled dog's paws as it competes. Sled dogs are prone to paw abrasions, nicknamed "raspberries" due to their appearance, from both the miles of running and the snow. Booties must be replaced frequently, or else they freeze into lumps of ice. They must also be changed every time a dog goes in water. Booties with holes are discarded.

Some races have minimum requirements for booties. The Iditarod and Yukon Quest both requires 8 booties per individual dog. It is not uncommon for mushers to bring more than the minimum along; for example, Susan Butcher and her friends sewed over 1000 booties for her to use during the 1986 Iditarod. At the end of a race, booties are among the most common debris that cleanup volunteers recover from the trail. In the aftermath of the 1992 Copper Basin 300, 30 dog booties were recovered.

=== Police and detection dogs ===
Dogs used for detection and police work are often given booties. They must work on various surfaces, such as hot asphalt, gravel, snow, or among cacti. Rescue dogs searching through rubble are especially prone to paw injuries, and booties are thus the standard for them. In the aftermath of the Oklahoma City bombing, after hearing about how badly damaged the paws of rescue dogs were, Alaskan mushers donated at least 200 booties for the rescue efforts.

Booties, however, are not ideal for all such work. It is advised that dogs used for avalanche rescues not be given booties, as this can make it more difficult for the dog to dig for survivors. In the early 2000s, Federal Emergency Management Agency bought $68,000 worth of booties for use in Hurricaine Katrina rescues, only to be told that recue dogs in that area do not normally wear them, resulting in the booties remaining in storage.
