= Rosebud Summit =

- Location within Alaska

Highest point
- Elevation: 3,640 ft (1,110 m)
- Coordinates: 65°14′21.77″N 145°49′38.40″W

Geography
- Location: Southwest of Central, Alaska, Fairbanks North Star Borough / Yukon-Koyukuk Census Area
- Parent range: White Mountains

Rosebud Summit is a 3,640 feet (1,109 m) peak that constitutes the northeasternmost point in the Rosebud Ridge of the White Mountains in central Alaska. The mountain is traversed by the trail of the annual Yukon Quest 1,000-mile sled dog race. It lends its name to nearby Rosebud Creek.
