= King Solomon's Dome =

Mountain in Canada

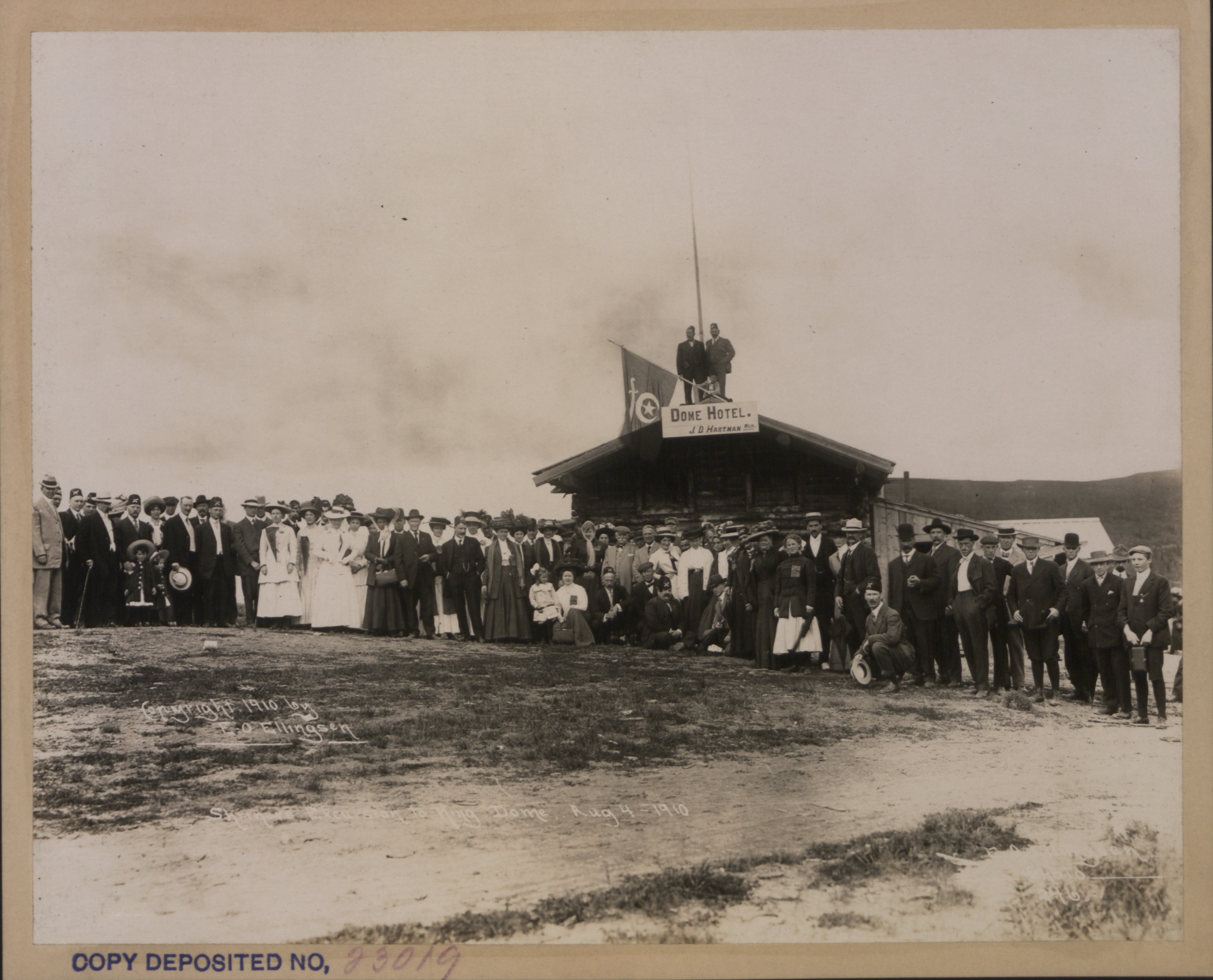
- Shriner's excursion to King Soloman's Dome Aug. 4, 1910

Highest point
- Elevation: 1,234 m (4,049 ft)
- Coordinates: 63°52′05″N 138°57′10″W

Naming
- Native name: Ch'ë`gaa tsòk (Hän)

Geography
- Location: Yukon, Canada
- Topo map: NTS 115O15 Flat Creek

King Solomon's Dome, also called King Solomon Dome, (Hän: Ch'ë`gaa tsòk) is a 1,234-metre (4,049 ft) peak in the Yukon-Mackenzie Divide region of the Yukon Territory, Canada. It is 32 kilometres (20 mi) southeast of Dawson City, Yukon, and is believed to be the source of the gold fields that sparked the Klondike Gold Rush at the turn of the 20th century. The mountain's name comes from King Solomon, an ancient king of Israel who was famed for his riches.

During the gold rush, the mountain was the site of large-scale gold mining and excavation. After the largest sources of gold ore were exhausted, small family-owned operations moved into the area and continue mining gold on and near the mountain today. A communications tower is located atop the mountain, and in 2001, the tower was the site of a fatal accident. The trail for the Yukon Quest 1,000-mile sled dog race passes over the mountain every February.

The mountain is in a subarctic climate region, and is covered by an average snowpack of 29 inches (74 cm) during March and April.
