= Braeburn Lodge =

Roadhouse in Yukon, Canada

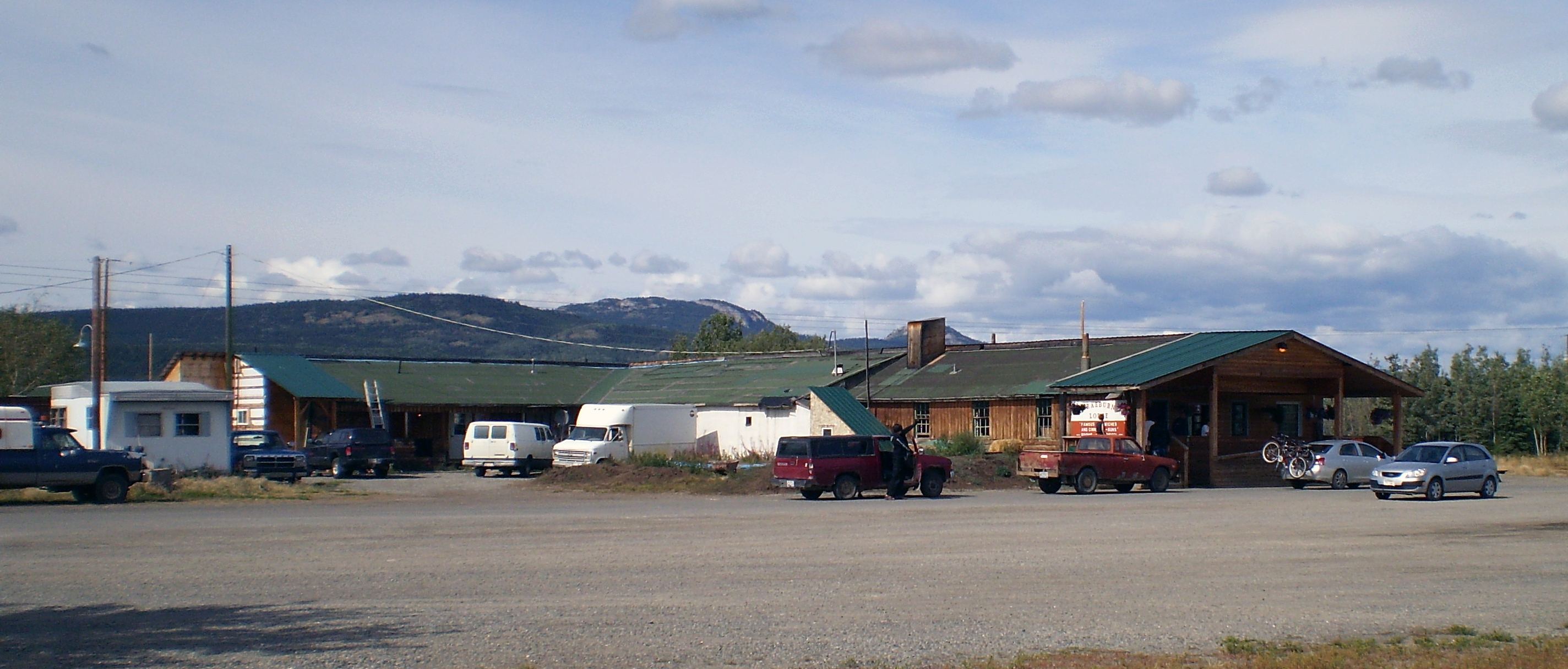
Braeburn Lodge

Braeburn Lodge is a roadhouse on the Klondike Highway in Yukon, Canada. It is located east of Braeburn Lake and north of Braeburn Mountain, on the path of the former Dawson Overland Trail, which was built in 1902 between Whitehorse and Dawson City. The lodge itself is a tourist destination and is famous for its large cinnamon buns. Nearby Cinnamon Bun Airstrip is named for the lodge's cinnamon buns. Every February, Braeburn Lodge hosts a checkpoint of the long-distance Yukon Quest sled dog race.

== Climate ==
The coldest temperature recorded in Braeburn was –55.7 °C (–68.3 °F) on 23 December 2025, while the highest temperature was 34 °C (93.2 °F) on 30 May 1983. A notable temperature of –54 °C (–65.2 °F) was recorded on 28 November 1985, which is the coldest November and autumn temperature recorded in North America.

Climate data for Braeburn (1981–2010) 61°28′01″N 135°46′59″W
Month	Jan	Feb	Mar	Apr	May	Jun	Jul	Aug	Sep	Oct	Nov	Dec	Year
Record high °C (°F)	9.0 (48.2)	7.8 (46.0)	13.5 (56.3)	21.5 (70.7)	34.0 (93.2)	30.5 (86.9)	30.5 (86.9)	31.5 (88.7)	26.0 (78.8)	18.5 (65.3)	8.9 (48.0)	10.0 (50.0)	34.0 (93.2)
Mean daily maximum °C (°F)	−14.4 (6.1)	−10.7 (12.7)	−0.9 (30.4)	7.4 (45.3)	14.2 (57.6)	19.1 (66.4)	21.1 (70.0)	19.0 (66.2)	12.4 (54.3)	2.7 (36.9)	−10.2 (13.6)	−13.7 (7.3)	3.8 (38.8)
Daily mean °C (°F)	−20.7 (−5.3)	−18.4 (−1.1)	−9.4 (15.1)	0.3 (32.5)	6.9 (44.4)	11.3 (52.3)	13.8 (56.8)	11.3 (52.3)	5.8 (42.4)	−2.3 (27.9)	−16.0 (3.2)	−19.9 (−3.8)	−3.1 (26.4)
Mean daily minimum °C (°F)	−27.0 (−16.6)	−26.0 (−14.8)	−17.9 (−0.2)	−6.9 (19.6)	−0.5 (31.1)	3.5 (38.3)	6.4 (43.5)	3.6 (38.5)	−0.8 (30.6)	−7.3 (18.9)	−21.8 (−7.2)	−26.1 (−15.0)	−10.1 (13.8)
Record low °C (°F)	−55.0 (−67.0)	−54.0 (−65.2)	−46.5 (−51.7)	−31.5 (−24.7)	−10.0 (14.0)	−5.0 (23.0)	−1.5 (29.3)	−6.0 (21.2)	−19.0 (−2.2)	−38.0 (−36.4)	−54.0 (−65.2)	−55.7 (−68.3)	−55.7 (−68.3)
Average precipitation mm (inches)	15.3 (0.60)	15.1 (0.59)	6.9 (0.27)	5.3 (0.21)	23.3 (0.92)	38.8 (1.53)	62.9 (2.48)	33.4 (1.31)	31.3 (1.23)	22.1 (0.87)	19.9 (0.78)	17.2 (0.68)	291.4 (11.47)
Average rainfall mm (inches)	0.0 (0.0)	0.0 (0.0)	0.0 (0.0)	2.4 (0.09)	22.6 (0.89)	38.8 (1.53)	62.9 (2.48)	33.1 (1.30)	27.3 (1.07)	8.0 (0.31)	0.0 (0.0)	0.1 (0.00)	195.2 (7.69)
Average snowfall cm (inches)	15.3 (6.0)	15.1 (5.9)	6.9 (2.7)	3.0 (1.2)	0.7 (0.3)	0.0 (0.0)	0.0 (0.0)	0.3 (0.1)	4.0 (1.6)	14.1 (5.6)	19.9 (7.8)	17.0 (6.7)	96.2 (37.9)
Average precipitation days (≥ 0.2 mm)	6.1	6.7	3.9	2.7	9.1	10.7	15.5	11.0	10.6	8.5	8.4	6.5	99.5
Average rainy days (≥ 0.2 mm)	0.0	0.0	0.0	1.4	8.8	10.7	15.5	10.9	9.8	3.0	0.0	0.1	60.2
Average snowy days (≥ 0.2 cm)	6.1	6.7	3.9	1.3	0.3	0.0	0.0	0.2	1.4	5.6	8.4	6.5	40.3
Source: Environment and Climate Change Canada Canadian Climate Normals 1981–2010
