= American Summit =

Mountain pass in Alaska, United States

- Häk'aww
- Interactive map of American Summit
- Elevation: 3,652 feet (1,113 m)
- Traversed by: Taylor Highway, Valdez-Eagle Trail (defunct)

Third Approach
- Location: Southwest of Central, Alaska, Southeast Fairbanks Census Area
- Range: Mertie Mountains
- Coordinates: 64.599°N 141.300°W

American Summit or (occasionally) American Pass (Hän: Häk'aww) is a 3,420 feet (1,042 m)-high mountain pass through the high ground of the Fortymile River district of east-central Alaska. Today, American Summit is traversed by the Taylor Highway, which connects the town of Eagle, Alaska to the Alaska Highway and the Top of the World Highway. Before the construction of the Taylor Highway in 1953, the Valdez-Eagle Trail passed over American Summit, providing the first overland route between the Gulf of Alaska and the gold fields of central Alaska.

American Summit has been used for thousands of years by Athabascan natives, who saw its utility as the lowest point in the White Mountains, which lie between the coast of Alaska and the Yukon River. In 1886 and again in 1896, gold was discovered in central Alaska, sparking a series of gold rushes that attracted thousands of miners to the Yukon River area of Alaska. In 1897, to protect the growing population of the region, the U.S. Army began to establish a series of forts along the Yukon River in order to help maintain order. One of these was Fort Egbert, built in the town of Eagle. Because of its isolated location, supplies for the fort and town had to either travel along the width of Alaska via the Yukon River or through previously established transportation routes in Canada. Seeking a quick all-American route, the U.S. government ordered the construction of a road from Valdez on the Gulf of Alaska to Fort Egbert.

American Summit, as the lowest point in the mountains separating the two locations, was a natural site for the road, which was completed by 1901. To supply even faster communications, the U.S. military began the construction of Washington-Alaska Military Cable and Telegraph System, of which Eagle would be the northernmost point. Telegraph lines were strung over American Summit in 1902, and an undersea cable connected Valdez to Seattle in 1904. After 1909, when a radio link was established, the telegraph line was abandoned. The road remained and was improved so that by the 1920s, the first automobiles climbed American Summit. In World War II, construction of the Alaska Highway also spurred work on that highway's side roads, and a project to improve the trail was begun in 1945. By 1953, the result was the Taylor Highway, a seasonal route that still connects Eagle to the outside world over American Summit.

During the 2004 Alaska fire season, the worst in recorded history, American Summit was the site of a 10,000-acre (40 km^{2}) wildfire, one of several hundred that ultimately consumed 6,600,000 acres (27,000 km^{2}) in Alaska that year.

Today, Eagle is an alcohol-free town, and American Summit is notable as the location of the liquor store nearest to Eagle. The store has been called one of the most remote liquor stores in the world. The Yukon Quest 1,000-mile (1,600 km) sled dog race crosses Eagle Summit every February on its route between Fairbanks, Alaska, and Whitehorse, Yukon.
