= Charlie Biederman =

American musher in Alaska

Charlie Biederman (November 11, 1918 – February 22, 1995) was a musher in Alaska best known for being the last surviving dog sled mail carrier in the United States. Charlie was born in Alaska as the son of Ed Biederman, a musher born in Bohemia who immigrated to the United States in 1874 and also delivered the mail via dog sled. The date of Charlie's birth is unclear, but contemporary U.S. Censuses indicate it likely was around 1919. Charlie had four siblings. Charlie was raised in Eagle, Alaska, but lived in an isolated cabin on the Yukon River for most of his life. From an early age, he assisted his father and brother in their winter deliveries of the mail to isolated cabins in central Alaska. In winter, the family lived in Eagle and ran the mail route between that town and Circle, another small settlement approximately 158 miles (254 km) downriver. In the summer, the family lived at their Yukon River cabin, harvesting fish for subsistence and boarding the dogs of fellow mushers. In 1938, the family were underbid for the main contract for mail delivery in the area by a bush pilot. Ed Biederman retired shortly afterward and died in 1945. The final dog sled mail route was replaced in 1963. That final route was from Gambell to Savoonga and was run by Chester Noongwook. In January 1995, he donated the mail-delivery sled he used to the National Postal Museum in Washington, D.C., where it hangs today. One month after making the delivery, he died on February 22, 1995.

Today, the cabin that served as Charlie Biederman's home for most of his life is a hospitality stop of the Yukon Quest, a 1,000-mile sled dog race between Whitehorse, Yukon, and Fairbanks, Alaska.
