= Overland Trail (Yukon) =

Klondike Gold Rush-era road in the Yukon

The Overland Trail was a Klondike Gold Rush-era transportation route between Whitehorse, Yukon and Dawson City in Yukon, Canada. It was built in 1902 at a cost of CDN$129,000 after the White Pass and Yukon Route railroad won a contract to deliver mail to the Dawson City gold fields from the Canadian government. The trail consisted of a 330 miles (531 km)-long, 12 feet (4 m) wide graded surface with culverts in some locations. Before its construction, transportation to Dawson City required a steamboat trip on the Yukon River during the brief subarctic summer, or dog sleds after the rivers had frozen.

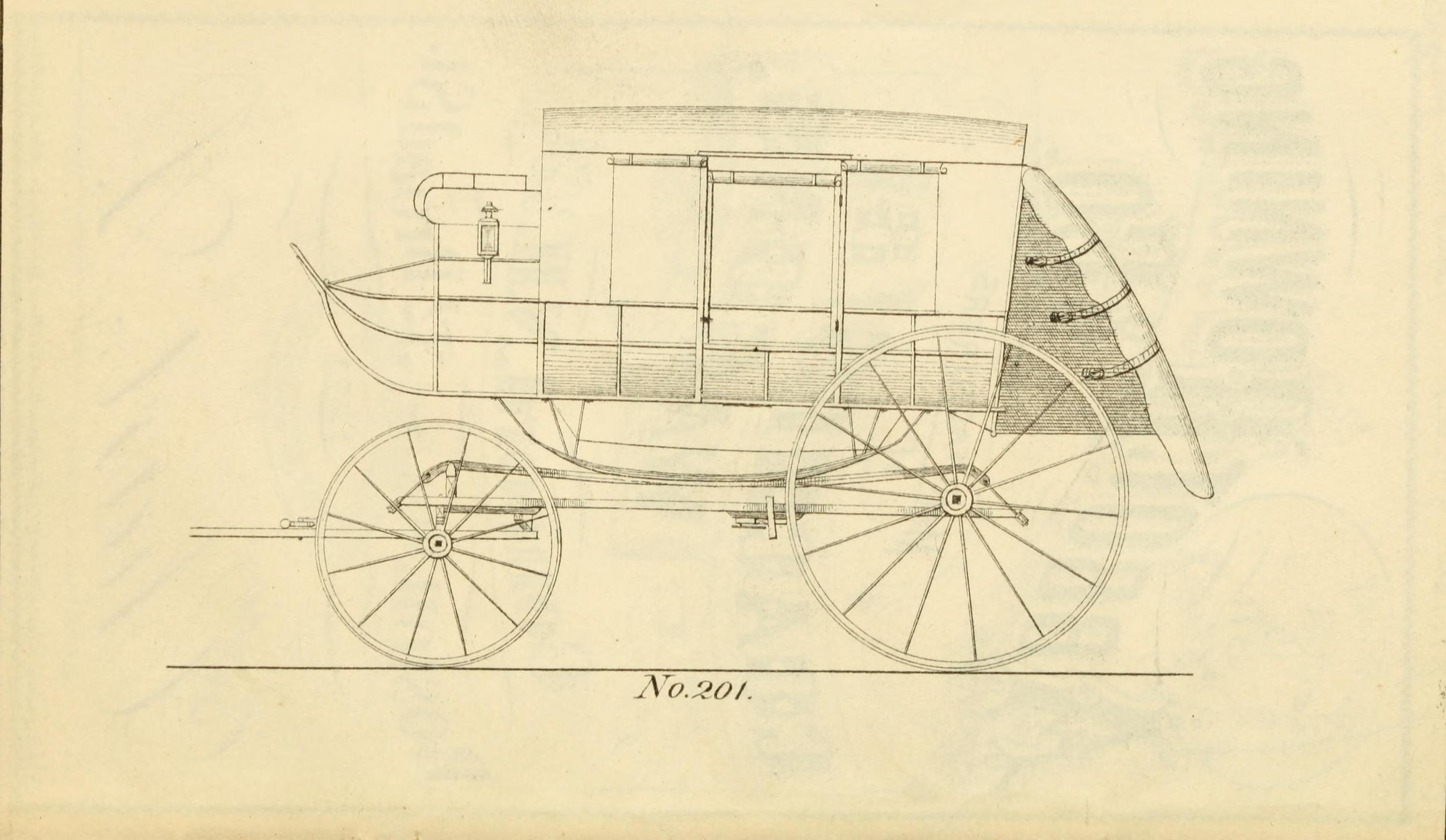
Stagecoach or passenger wagon Abbot, Downing's Overland Wagon

After its construction, horse-drawn stagecoach routes soon were established. Even with this regulated travel, it took five days to travel between the two towns. Sleighs were substituted for coaches once snow began to fall, and passengers were charged CDN$125 for a one-way trip.

The first automobile used the trail in 1912, but soon afterward, declining returns from the gold mines caused the population of Yukon to drop precipitously. In 1921, the White Pass discontinued operating stages on the Overland Trail, and the mail contracts were awarded to other contractors thereafter. In 1922, the mail contractor switched from horse-drawn vehicles to motor vehicles. In 1955, a new automobile highway was built north from Whitehorse to Mayo, with a spur to Dawson City. This highway made the Overland Trail obsolete, and it fell into disrepair. That road itself was replaced by the Klondike Highway. Today, the Overland Trail is primarily a recreation route for sled dog teams, snowmobiles, and other tourism-related activities. Artifacts relating to the Gold Rush-era use of the trail are plentiful along the route, which is used in February as part of the Yukon Quest, a 1,000-mile sled dog race between Whitehorse and Fairbanks, Alaska.

== White Pass & Yukon Route overland trail equipment, 1901–1921 ==
White Pass Wagons (29 units)
1909-Ser. Road No.	Type	Builder(s)	Year built	Remarks
1	Passenger Wagon	Gear: Abbot-Downing Co. (Concord, New Hampshire); Suspension and Body: WP&YR	1902	41 in. front & 54 in. rear wheels. Cap’y = 11 Psgrs. & ½ ton of freight. Original body of #1 appears to have been installed on Sleigh #42 or 43 in January 1905. One of ##1, 4, 7, and 8 (four passenger wagons) was destroyed by a flood at Carmacks in 1918, leaving three. One was sold in 1928, leaving two. The remaining two of ##1, 4, 7, and 8 were written off in 1950.
2	Passenger Wagon	Gear: Abbot-Downing Co. (Concord, New Hampshire); Suspension and Body: WP&YR	1902	41 in. front & 54 in. rear wheels. Cap’y = 11 Psgrs. & ½ ton of freight. Original body of #2 appears to have been installed on Sleigh #42 or 43 in January 1905. Sold in 1928 to interests at Denali Park.
3	Passenger Wagon	Gear: Pacific Wagon Co. (Seattle); Suspension and Body: WP&YR	1903	41 in. front & 54 in. rear wheels. Cap’y = 11 Psgrs. & ½ ton of freight. Middle bench seat removed, thereby reducing passenger capacity to 8. Given to the Royal Canadian Air Force in 1944. Put on display at Yukon Historical Society Museum in 1953. Museum renamed MacBride Museum in 1967.
4	Passenger Wagon	Gear: Pacific Wagon Co. (Seattle); Suspension and Body: WP&YR	1903	41 in. front & 54 in. rear wheels. Cap’y = 11 Psgrs. & ½ ton of freight. For disposition, see, Remarks for #1, above.
5	Passenger Wagon	Gear: Pacific Wagon Co. (Seattle); Suspension and Body: WP&YR	1903	41 in. front & 54 in. rear wheels. Cap’y = 11 Psgrs. & ½ ton of freight. Given to the U.S. Army Air Corps in 1944.
6	Passenger Wagon	Gear: Pacific Wagon Co. (Seattle); Suspension and Body: WP&YR	1904	41 in. front & 54 in. rear wheels. Cap’y = 11 Psgrs. & ½ ton of freight. Middle bench seat removed, thereby reducing passenger capacity to 8. Sold to E. J. Spinney Trucking Service in 1944. Mr. Spinney died in 1948. Wagon put on display by 1953. Wagon put on display by 1953 at Carcross, Yukon.
7	Passenger Wagon	Suspension and Body: WP&YR	1906	For disposition, see, Remarks for #1, above.
8	Passenger Wagon	Suspension and Body: WP&YR	1915	For disposition, see, Remarks for #1, above.
9	Passenger Wagon	Suspension and Body: WP&YR	1917	43 in. front & 56 in. rear wheels. Cap’y = 11 Psgrs. & ½ ton of freight. Suspension and body built by White Pass. Written off in 1950. Put on display at Yukon Historical Society Museum in 1953. Museum renamed MacBride Museum in 1967. Wagon has green paint.
10	Heavy Freight Wagon	Gear: Studebaker Bros. (South Bend, Indiana); Body: WP&YR	1902	44 in. front & 54 in. rear wheels. Cap’y = 1 Psgr. & 5 tons of freight. Originally, #7. Officially renumbered to 10 about 1909. Written off in 1950.
11	Heavy Freight Wagon	Bain Wagon Co. (Kenosha, Wisconsin)	1902	45 in. front & 56 in. rear wheels. Cap’y = 1 Psgr. & 5 tons of freight. One of ##11-15 (five Bain heavy freight wagons) was sold in 1912, leaving four. One was sold in 1940, leaving three. Parts of one were sold in 1948, leaving two. The remaining two of ##11-15 were written off in 1950.
12	Heavy Freight Wagon	Bain Wagon Co. (Kenosha, Wisconsin)	1902	45 in. front & 56 in. rear wheels. Cap’y = 1 Psgr. & 5 tons of freight. For disposition, see, Remarks for #11, above.
13	Heavy Freight Wagon	Bain Wagon Co. (Kenosha, Wisconsin)	1902	45 in. front & 56 in. rear wheels. Cap’y = 1 Psgr. & 5 tons of freight. For disposition, see, Remarks for #11, above.
14	Heavy Freight Wagon	Bain Wagon Co. (Kenosha, Wisconsin)	1902	45 in. front & 56 in. rear wheels. Cap’y = 1 Psgr. & 5 tons of freight. For disposition, see, Remarks for #11, above.
15	Heavy Freight Wagon	Bain Wagon Co. (Kenosha, Wisconsin)	1902	45 in. front & 56 in. rear wheels. Cap’y = 1 Psgr. & 5 tons of freight. For disposition, see, Remarks for #11, above.
16 (physically retaining #9)	Heavy Freight Wagon	Bain Wagon Co. (Kenosha, Wisconsin)	1902	45 in. front & 56 in. rear wheels. Cap’y = 1 Psgr. & 5 tons of freight. Originally, #9. Officially, renumbered in 1905 and 1909. Nevertheless, physically retained #9, possibly because it may have been taken out of service by 1905. Transferred to the Yukon Transportation Museum in 1990.
17	Store Wagon	Winkler Bros. Mfg. Co. (South Bend, Indiana)	1904	34 in. front & 49 in. rear wheels. Cap’y = 2½ tons of freight. Written off in 1950.
18	Concord Road Wagon	Groton Carriage Co. (Groton, New York)	1904	41 in. front & 46 in. rear wheels. Cap’y = 3 Psgrs. Sold in 1928.
19	Break Cart	Fraser Road Cart Co.	1903	49 in. wheels. Cap’y = 0 Psgrs. (other than the driver). Used to train horses. Written off in 1950.
20	Light 2-Horse Buckboard	WP&YR	1907	Sold in 1922.
21	Light 4-Horse Buckboard	WP&YR	1907	Sold in 1928.
22	Heavy 4-Horse Buckboard	WP&YR	1909	Cap’y = 4 Psgrs. & 1¾ tons of freight. Sold in 1924.
23	Medium Freight Wagon	Bain Wagon Co. (Kenosha, Wisconsin)	1909	Sold in 1926.
24	Single Buggy		1911	Written off in 1950.
25	Light Buckboard w/Top		1915	Sold in 1917.
26	Medium Freight Wagon		1915	Sold in 1926.
27	Light Freight Wagon		1916	One ##27 and 28 (light freight wagons) was sold in 1926, and the other was sold in 1929.
28	Light Freight Wagon		1917	For disposition, see, Remarks for #27, above.
29	Side Bar Road Wagon		1917	Sold in 1924.

White Pass Sleighs (54 units)
1909-Ser. Road No.	Type	Builder(s)	Year built	Remarks
31	Passenger Sleigh	Gear: Weber Wagon Co. (Chicago); Body: WP&YR	1901	75 in. bobs. Cap’y = 14 Psgrs. & ¾ ton of freight. One of ##31, 32, 34-35, 38-40 and 44 (eight 75 in. bob passenger sleighs) was sold in 1924, leaving seven. One was sold in 1925, leaving six. One was scrapped in 1929, leaving five. One lost its running gear in Laberge Lake in 1930, leaving four. Two were sold in 1931, leaving two. One was sold in 1932, leaving one. The remaining one of ##31, 32, 34-35, 38-40 and 44 was sold in 1934.
32	Passenger Sleigh	Gear: Weber Wagon Co. (Chicago); Body: WP&YR	1901	75 in. bobs. Cap’y = 14 Psgrs. & ¾ ton of freight. For disposition, see, Remarks for #31, above.
33 (physically retaining #3)	Passenger Sleigh	Gear: Weber Wagon Co. (Chicago); Body: WP&YR	1901	75 in. bobs. Cap’y = 14 Psgrs. & ¾ ton of freight. Originally, #3. Officially renumbered to 23 in 1905. Officially renumbered to 33 about 1909. Nevertheless, physically retained #3, possibly because it may have been taken out of service by 1905. Written off in 1950. Wheels substituted for bobs by 1973. The body was transferred to the Yukon Transportation Museum in 1990. Re-equipped with newly made bobs between 1992 & 2013.
34	Passenger Sleigh	Gear: Weber Wagon Co. (Chicago); Body: WP&YR	1901	75 in. bobs. Cap’y = 9 Psgrs. & ½ ton of freight. For disposition, see, Remarks for #31, above.
35	Passenger Sleigh	Gear: Weber Wagon Co. (Chicago); Body: WP&YR	1901	75 in. bobs. Cap’y = 9 Psgrs. & ½ ton of freight. For disposition, see, Remarks for #31, above.
36 (physically retaining #26)	Passenger Sleigh	Gear: Weber Wagon Co. (Chicago); Body: WP&YR	1901	75 in. bobs. Cap’y = 14 Psgrs. & ¾ ton of freight. Originally, #6. Renumbered to 26 in 1905. Officially renumbered to 36 about 1909. Nevertheless, physically retained #26, possibly because it may have been taken out of service by 1909. Written off in 1950. Body without bobs sold to George Larson in 1962. Re-sold to Henry Tjoelker of Everson, Washington in 2001. Re-equipped with bobs from its era in 2001 or 2002. Last reported in 2006 to be with Mr. Tjoelker.
37 (physically retaining #7)	Passenger Sleigh	Gear: Weber Wagon Co. (Chicago); Body: WP&YR	1901	75 in. bobs. Cap’y = 14 Psgrs. & ¾ ton of freight. Originally, #7. Officially renumbered to 27 in 1905. Officially renumbered to 37 about 1909. Nevertheless, physically retained #7, possibly because it may have been taken out of service by 1905. Written off in 1950. Put on display at Yukon Historical Society Museum in 1953. Museum renamed MacBride Museum in 1967.
38	Passenger Sleigh	Gear: Weber Wagon Co. (Chicago); Body: WP&YR	1902	75 in. bobs. Cap’y = 14 Psgrs. & ¾ ton of freight. For disposition, see, Remarks for #31, above.
39	Passenger Sleigh	Gear: Weber Wagon Co. (Chicago); Body: WP&YR	1902	75 in. bobs. Cap’y = 14 Psgrs. & ¾ ton of freight. For disposition, see, Remarks for #31, above.
40	Passenger Sleigh	Gear: Weber Wagon Co. (Chicago); Body: WP&YR	1902	75 in. bobs. Cap’y = 14 Psgrs. & ¾ ton of freight. For disposition, see, Remarks for #31, above.
41	Passenger Sleigh	Gear: Weber Wagon Co. (Chicago); Body: WP&YR	1902	75 in. bobs. Cap’y = 14 Psgrs. & ¾ ton of freight. Written off in 1950. The body of #41 was at Yukon Crossing in 1963, without its running gear and without its center seats.
[32]	Passenger Sleigh	Gear: Studebaker Bros. (South Bend, Indiana); Body: Abbot-Downing Co. (Concord, New Hampshire)	1904	66 in. bobs. Cap’y = 5 Psgrs. & 0.35 ton of freight. Body appears to have been the original body of Wagon #1 or 2. Sold in 1905, before the 1909 renumbering, when it would have been renumbered to 42.
43	Passenger Sleigh	Gear: Studebaker Bros. (South Bend, Indiana); Body: Abbot-Downing Co. (Concord, New Hampshire)	1907	66 in. bobs. Cap’y = 5 Psgrs. & 0.35 ton of freight. Body appears to have been the original body of Wagon #1 or 2. Written off in 1950.
44	Passenger Sleigh	Gear: Weber Wagon Co. (Chicago); Body: WP&YR	1907	75 in. bobs. Cap’y = 9 Psgrs. & ½ ton of freight. For disposition of #44, see, Remarks for #31, above.
45	Double Cutter	William J. Mable (Victoria, British Columbia)	1903	120 in. runners. Cap’y = 1 Psgr. For use by superintendent, assistant superintendent, or blacksmith. One of ##45-48 (four cutters) was sold in 1917, and the remaining three were written off in 1950.
46	Double Cutter	Mission (Victoria, British Columbia)	1903	108 in. runners. Cap’y = 1 Psgr. For use by superintendent, assistant superintendent, or blacksmith. For disposition, see, Remarks for #45, above.
47	Double Cutter	Ottawa Carriage Co. (Ottawa, Ontario)	1903	108 in. runners. Cap’y = 1 Psgr. For use by superintendent, assistant superintendent, or blacksmith. For disposition, see, Remarks for #45, above.
48	Single Cutter	WP&YR	1905	102 in. runners. Cap’y = 1 Psgr. For disposition, see, Remarks for #45, above.
49	Light Bob Sleigh	McLaughlin Carriage Co. (Oshawa, Ontario)	1905	30 in. bobs. Cap’y = 3 Psgrs. & ¼ ton of freight. Written off in 1950.
–	–	–	–	–
51	Freight Sleigh	Gear: Weber Wagon Co. (Chicago); Body: WP&YR	1901	75 in. bobs. Cap’y = 2 Psgrs. & 5 tons of freight. Four of ##51, 53-55, and 57-62 (ten 75 in. bob freight sleighs) were sold in 1909, leaving six. Two were sold in 1917, leaving four. One was sold in 1921, leaving three. One was sold in 1922, leaving two. One was sold in 1925, leaving one. The remaining one of ##51, 53-55, and 57-62 was sold in 1926.
52	Freight Sleigh	Gear: B.F.&H.L. Sweet (Fond du Lac, Wisconsin); Body: WP&YR	1903	76 in. bobs. Cap’y = 2 Psgrs. & 5 tons of freight. One of ##52, 56, 73, 74, and 84 (five 76 in. bob freight sleighs) was sold in 1919, leaving four. One was sold in 1921, leaving three. Two were sold in 1926, leaving one. The remaining one of ##52, 56, 73, 74, and 84 was sold by 1937.
53	Freight Sleigh	Gear: Weber Wagon Co. (Chicago); Body: WP&YR	1901	75 in. bobs. Cap’y = 2 Psgrs. & 5 tons of freight. For disposition, see, Remarks for #51, above.
54	Freight Sleigh	Gear: Weber Wagon Co. (Chicago); Body: WP&YR	1901	75 in. bobs. Cap’y = 2 Psgrs. & 5 tons of freight. For disposition, see, Remarks for #51, above.
55	Freight Sleigh	Gear: Weber Wagon Co. (Chicago); Body: WP&YR	1901	75 in. bobs. Cap’y = 2 Psgrs. & 5 tons of freight. For disposition, see, Remarks for #51, above.
56	Freight Sleigh	Gear: B.F.&H.L. Sweet (Fond du Lac, Wisconsin); Body: WP&YR	1903	76 in. bobs. Cap’y = 2 Psgrs. & 5 tons of freight. For disposition, see, Remarks for #52, above.
57	Freight Sleigh	Gear: Weber Wagon Co. (Chicago); Body: WP&YR	1901	75 in. bobs. Cap’y = 2 Psgrs. & 5 tons of freight. For disposition, see, Remarks for #51, above.
58	Freight Sleigh	Gear: Weber Wagon Co. (Chicago); Body: WP&YR	1901	75 in. bobs. Cap’y = 2 Psgrs. & 5 tons of freight. For disposition, see, Remarks for #51, above.
59	Freight Sleigh	Gear: Weber Wagon Co. (Chicago); Body: WP&YR	1901	75 in. bobs. Cap’y = 2 Psgrs. & 5 tons of freight. For disposition, see, Remarks for #51, above.
60	Freight Sleigh	Gear: Weber Wagon Co. (Chicago); Body: WP&YR	1901	75 in. bobs. Cap’y = 2 Psgrs. & 5 tons of freight. For disposition, see, Remarks for #51, above.
61	Freight Sleigh	Gear: Weber Wagon Co. (Chicago); Body: WP&YR	1901	75 in. bobs. Cap’y = 2 Psgrs. & 5 tons of freight. For disposition, see, Remarks for #51, above.
62	Freight Sleigh	Gear: Weber Wagon Co. (Chicago); Body: WP&YR	1901	75 in. bobs. Cap’y = 2 Psgrs. & 5 tons of freight. For disposition, see, Remarks for #51, above.
63	Logging Sleigh	B.F.&H.L. Sweet (Fond du Lac, Wisconsin)	1905	76 in. bobs. Sold in 1923.
64	Logging Sleigh	B.F.&H.L. Sweet (Fond du Lac, Wisconsin)	1905	76 in. bobs. Sold in 1923.
65	Perishable Sleigh	Gear: Weber Wagon Co. (Chicago); Body: WP&YR	1907	75 in. bobs. One ##65 and 66 (two 75 in. bob perishable sleighs) was destroyed by a flood at Carmacks in 1918, and the remaining one was sold in 1923.
66	Perishable Sleigh	Gear: Weber Wagon Co. (Chicago); Body: WP&YR	1907	75 in. bobs. For disposition, see, Remarks for #65, above.
67	Perishable Sleigh	Gear: Studebaker Bros. (South Bend, Indiana); Body: WP&YR	1908	78 in. bobs. One of ##67-69 (three 78 in. bob perishable sleighs) was sold in 1926, leaving two. One more was sold by 1937, leaving one. The remaining of ##67-69 one was written off in 1950.
68	Perishable Sleigh	Gear: Studebaker Bros. (South Bend, Indiana); Body: WP&YR	1908	78 in. bobs. For disposition, see, Remarks for #67, above.
69	Perishable Sleigh	Gear: Studebaker Bros. (South Bend, Indiana); Body: WP&YR	1908	78 in. bobs. For disposition, see, Remarks for #67, above.
–	–	–	–	–
71	Freight Sleigh	Gear: Studebaker Bros. (South Bend, Indiana); Body: WP&YR	1909	78 in. bobs. Cap’y = 2 Psgrs. & 5 tons of freight. One ##71, 72, 82, 83, and 85 (five 78 in. bob freight sleighs) was sold in 1922, leaving four. One was sold in 1924, leaving three. The remaining three of ##71, 72, 82, 83, and 85 were sold in 1926.
72	Freight Sleigh	Gear: Studebaker Bros. (South Bend, Indiana); Body: WP&YR	1909	78 in. bobs. Cap’y = 2 Psgrs. & 5 tons of freight. For disposition, see, Remarks for #71, above.
73	Freight Sleigh	Gear: B.F.&H.L. Sweet (Fond du Lac, Wisconsin); Body: WP&YR	1909	76 in. bobs. Cap’y = 2 Psgrs. & 5 tons of freight. For disposition, see, Remarks for #52, above.
74	Freight Sleigh	Gear: B.F.&H.L. Sweet (Fond du Lac, Wisconsin); Body: WP&YR	1909	76 in. bobs. Cap’y = 2 Psgrs. & 5 tons of freight. For disposition, see, Remarks for #52, above.
75	Dalton (light) Sleigh	Gear: Studebaker Bros. (South Bend, Indiana)	1910	66 in. bobs. Written off in 1950.
76	Heavy Freight Sleigh	Gear: B.F.&H.L. Sweet (Fond du Lac, Wisconsin)	1911	76 in. bobs. For use on Caterpillar® train. Four of ##76-80 (five 76 in. bob heavy freight sleighs) were sold in 1926, and the remaining one was sold in 1929.
77	Heavy Freight Sleigh	Gear: B.F.&H.L. Sweet (Fond du Lac, Wisconsin)	1911	76 in. bobs. For use on Caterpillar® train. For disposition, see, Remarks #76, above.
78	Heavy Freight Sleigh	Gear: B.F.&H.L. Sweet (Fond du Lac, Wisconsin)	1911	76 in. bobs. For use on Caterpillar® train. For disposition, see, Remarks #76, above.
79	Heavy Freight Sleigh	Gear: B.F.&H.L. Sweet (Fond du Lac, Wisconsin)	1911	76 in. bobs. For use on Caterpillar® train. For disposition, see, Remarks #76, above.
80	Heavy Freight Sleigh	Gear: B.F.&H.L. Sweet (Fond du Lac, Wisconsin)	1911	76 in. bobs. For use on Caterpillar® train. For disposition, see, Remarks #76, above.
81	Caboose Sleigh		1912	Bobs. For use on Caterpillar® train. Sold in 1923.
82	Freight Sleigh	Gear: Studebaker Bros. (South Bend, Indiana); Body: WP&YR	1915	78 in. bobs. For disposition, see, Remarks for #71, above.
83	Freight Sleigh	Gear: Studebaker Bros. (South Bend, Indiana); Body: WP&YR	1915	78 in. bobs. For disposition, see, Remarks for #71, above.
84	Freight Sleigh	Gear: B.F.&H.L. Sweet (Fond du Lac, Wisconsin); Body: WP&YR	1915	76 in. bobs. For disposition, see, Remarks for #52, above.
85	Freight Sleigh	Gear: Studebaker Bros. (South Bend, Indiana); Body: WP&YR	1917	78 in. bobs. For disposition, see, Remarks for #71, above.
86	Logging Sleigh	B.F.&H.L. Sweet (Fond du Lac, Wisconsin)	1917	76 in. bobs. Sold in 1923.

Studebaker Bros. Mfg. Co. made Sensible™ bobs. B. F. & H. L. Sweet made Common Sense™ bobs. Weber Wagon Co. made Good Sense™ bobs. Weber sold out to International Harvester Co. in 1904.

White Pass Horses (approximately 1,358 head)
Fiscal Year, July 1 to June 30	No. at Beginning of Fiscal Year (July 1)	No. Purchased during Fiscal Year	Maximum No. during Trail Season (≈ Nov.-Apr.)	No. Sold during Fiscal Year	Died during Fiscal Year	No. at End of Fiscal Year (June 30)
1901-1902	0	155	155	0	31	124
1902-1903	124	55	172	84	47	48
1903-1904	48	168	193	74	25	117
1904-1905	117	89	177	69	12	123
1905-1906	123	60 (+1 born)	164	55	9	120
1906-1907	120	101	192	29	14	178
1907-1908	178	56	199	39	14	181
1908-1909	181	43	205	51	5	168
1909-1910	168	62	217	27	8	195
1910-1911	195	91	162	148	23	115
1911-1912	115	70	164	50	16	119
1912-1913	119	75	162	75	25	94
1913-1914	94	114	167	30	18	160
1914-1915	160	40	154	29	40	131
1915-1916	131	90	181	22	38	161
1916-1917	161	42	168	13	28	162
1917-1918	162	4	141	4	43	119
1918-1919	119	20	122	24	16	99
1919-1920	99	22	117	74	3	44
1920-1921	44	0	44	43	1	0

White Pass Overland Trail Gasoline Equipment (6 units)
Type	Year acquired	Remarks
Winton 1909 Model 17 Touring Car	1910	48 hp. Maximum speed ≈ 12 mph. Written off in 1950.
Holt 45 Caterpillar® Tractor	1911	Holt serial #1175 (1911). 45 hp. Holt M-1 engine. Maximum speed ≈ 4 miles per hour. In service in 1941. Unserviceable in 1942. Still existed in 1950. Disposed of by 1965.
Crawler Tractor	1911	Built in United Kingdom. Intended for passenger service. Maximum speed ≈ 7½ miles per hour. Unusable. Wheels frequently came off tracks. Returned to manufacturer in 1912.
Knox 1912 Model G 2-Ton Stake Truck	1912	45 hp. Written off in 1950.
Knox Automobile	1913	Sold in 1923.
Ford 1912 Model T Torpedo Runabout	1917	22 hp. Written off in 1950.

For the roster of White Pass boats, see, List of steamboats on the Yukon River.

For the roster of White Pass railroad equipment, see, List of White Pass and Yukon Route locomotives and cars.
