= Coghlan Lake =

Lake in Yukon Territory, Canada

- Location within Yukon Location within Canada
- Location: Yukon Territory
- Coordinates: 61°32′42″N 135°29′13.99″W
- Basin countries: Canada
- Surface area: 8.2 km^{2} (3.2 sq mi)
- Average depth: 24 m (79 ft)
- Residence time: 2.5 years

Coghlan Lake is a body of water located about 60 miles (97 km) north of Whitehorse, Yukon Territory, Canada. It is 7 miles (11 km) long and 0.75 miles (1.21 km) wide. It has a surface area of 8.2 km^{2} (3.2 sq mi) and an average depth of 24 m (79 ft). The lake contains many shoals and small islands. It is in a remote and mostly uninhabited area, but it does attract seasonal attention from vacationing fishermen. The most common fish in the lake are lake trout, northern pike, Arctic grayling, burbot, and whitefish. During the winter, the lake forms part of the course for the Yukon Quest sled dog race.
