= Sebastian Schnuelle =

Canadian dog musher and dog sled racer

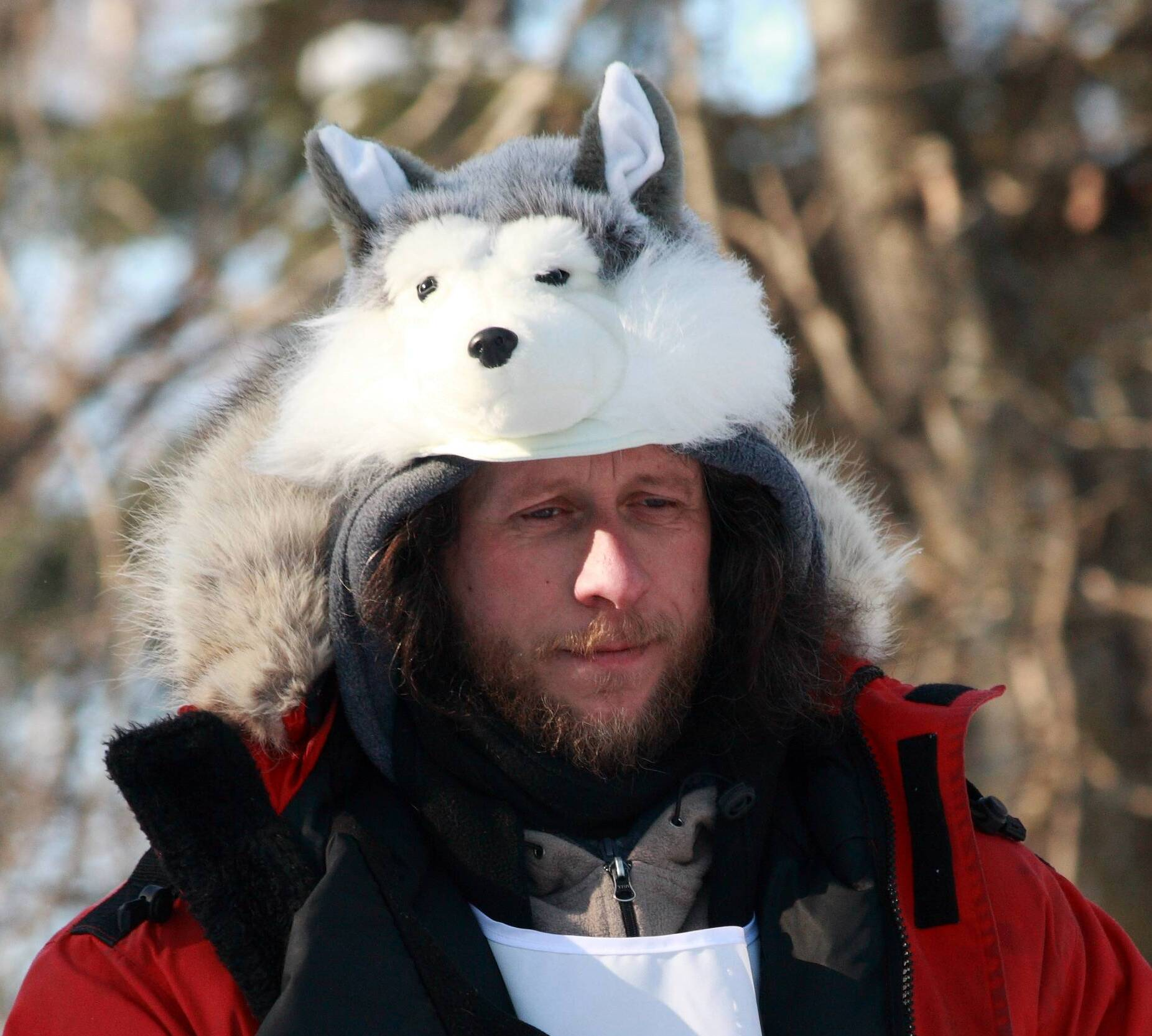
Schnuelle in 2009

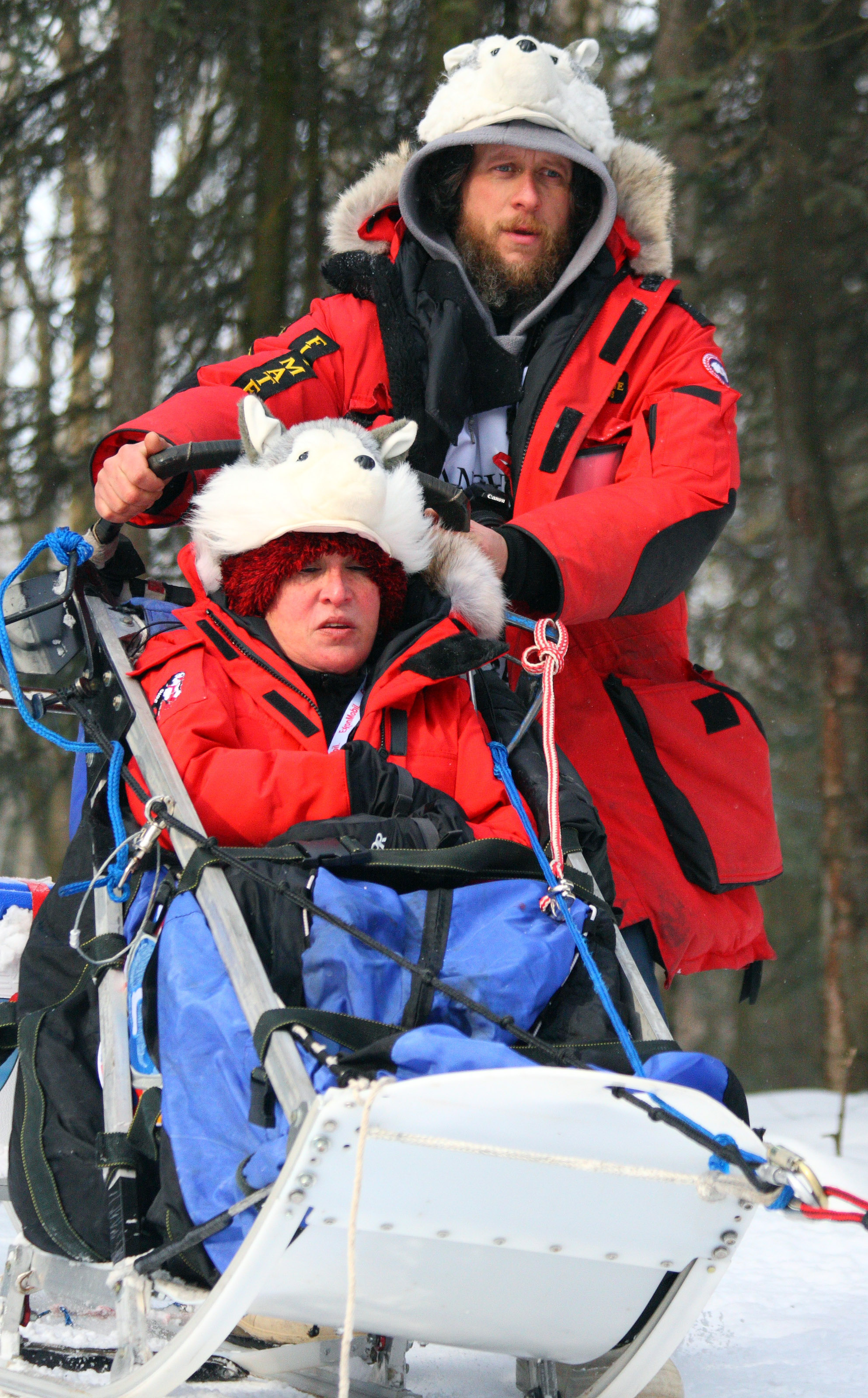
Sebastian Schnuelle at the ceremonial start of the 2010 Iditarod.

Sebastian Schnuelle (born May 21, 1970) is a Canadian dog musher and dog sled racer from Whitehorse, Yukon, who won the 2009 1,000 mile Yukon Quest sled dog race. Schnuelle is fluent in English, French, and German. Nicknames: 'Sab' or 'the Armchair Musher'.

Schnuelle was born in Wuppertal, Germany. By the age of 25 he had become an industrial mechanic for Mercedes-Benz, however he decided to take a leave from that duty and spent the summer working in an Ontario national park. Following that adventure, he undertook a canoe trip up the length of the Mackenzie River finishing at Tuktoyaktuk. After that canoe trip he decided to settle in the Yukon choosing the Whitehorse area where he took up mushing and would eventually open a dog sled tour business called Blue Kennels (named after his first sled dog "Blue"). He began running both the Yukon Quest and the Iditarod Trail Sled Dog Race in 2005 and continued entering both in 2006, and 2007. Following his victory in the 2009 Yukon Quest, he plans to complete the double again by competing in the 2009 Iditarod. Schnuelle captured the Veterinarians choice award as well as the Sportsmanship award in the 2007 Yukon Quest. His lead dogs Inuk, and Popcorn captured the Golden Harness award in the 2009 Yukon Quest. In the same year he became second in the Iditarod. In the Yukon Quest 2011 he also finished second.
