= Eagle Summit (Alaska) =

Mountain gap through the White Mountains of central Alaska

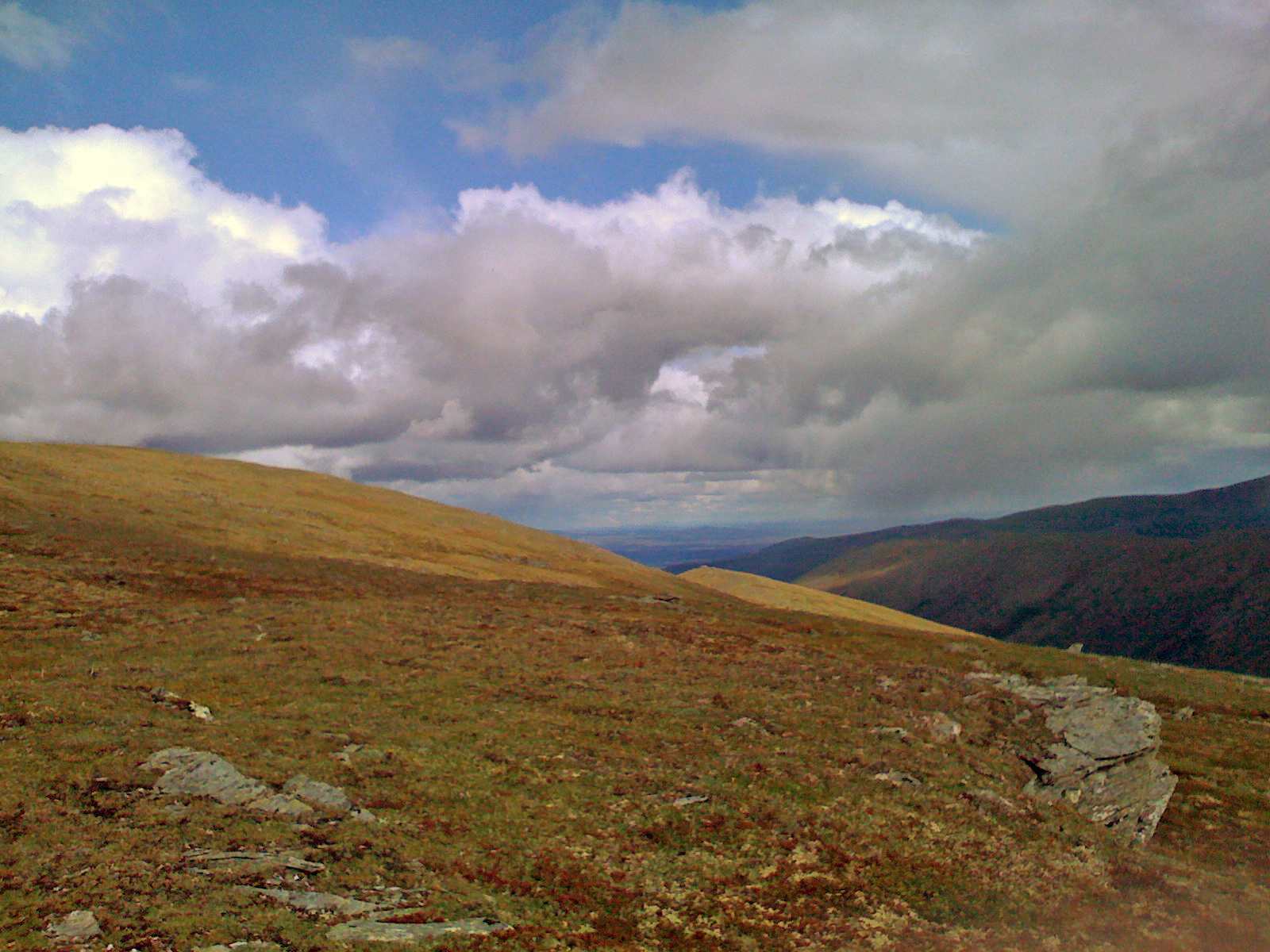
- The east slope of Eagle Summit, seen looking north in summer 2008.
- Interactive map of Eagle Summit
- Elevation: 3,652 feet (1,113 m)
- Traversed by: Steese Highway

Third Approach
- Location: Southwest of Central, Alaska, Yukon-Koyukuk Census Area
- Range: White Mountains
- Coordinates: 65°29′04″N 145°24′13″W

Eagle Summit is a 3,652 feet (1,113 m)-tall gap through the White Mountains of central Alaska. The gap was named after the nearby Eagle River by prospectors from nearby Circle, Alaska.

Eagle Summit is the site of a convergence zone between the Yukon Flats to the north and the low ground of the Tanana Valley to the south. Any differential in the weather within the two valleys causes high winds and precipitation when there is moisture in the atmosphere. In 1916, Hudson Stuck, who was one of the first people to climb Denali's South Peak, wrote, "The Eagle Summit is one of the most difficult summits in Alaska. The wind blows so fiercely that sometimes for days together its passage is almost impossible. ... The snow smothers up everything on the lee side of the hill, and the end of every storm presents a new surface and an altered route. ... there is no easier pass and no way around."

It was for this latter reason that engineers chose Eagle Summit as the route to build the Steese Highway, which connects Fairbanks, Alaska to the Yukon River at Circle. In 1927, just 11 years after Stuck became one of the first Americans to navigate Eagle Summit on dog sled, the highway was completed and road travel over the summit became possible. Today, Eagle Summit still is the highest point on the highway and tourism guides recommend its scenic views. One side has one starring down cliffs, while the other resembles Antarctica in the winter months. Eagle Summit also experiences Midnight Sun around the time of the summer solstice despite being south of the Arctic Circle, due to its elevation.

The trail of the annual Yukon Quest 1,000-mile sled dog race also passes over Eagle Summit. The area's high winds, drifting snow, and steep terrain make it the most difficult section of trail in the race, and some competitors have called it the most difficult section of trail in any sled dog race in the world. In 2006, a fierce storm atop Eagle Summit caused whiteout conditions that forced seven mushers and dog teams to be evacuated via helicopter from the mountain. Partially because of the storm, only 11 mushers finished the race — the fewest in Yukon Quest history.

== Climate ==
Climate data for Eagle Summit, Alaska, 2001–2023 normals, 1991–2020 precipitation: 3650ft (1113m)
Month	Jan	Feb	Mar	Apr	May	Jun	Jul	Aug	Sep	Oct	Nov	Dec	Year
Record high °F (°C)	48 (9)	48 (9)	55 (13)	67 (19)	73 (23)	77 (25)	75 (24)	76 (24)	65 (18)	65 (18)	46 (8)	51 (11)	77 (25)
Mean maximum °F (°C)	33.0 (0.6)	36.4 (2.4)	38.7 (3.7)	52.0 (11.1)	62.3 (16.8)	67.2 (19.6)	70.3 (21.3)	66.3 (19.1)	54.5 (12.5)	46.3 (7.9)	32.8 (0.4)	35.3 (1.8)	71.5 (21.9)
Mean daily maximum °F (°C)	9.9 (−12.3)	14.2 (−9.9)	14.9 (−9.5)	31.1 (−0.5)	47.2 (8.4)	56.2 (13.4)	58.7 (14.8)	52.2 (11.2)	40.9 (4.9)	28.3 (−2.1)	14.9 (−9.5)	13.1 (−10.5)	31.8 (−0.1)
Daily mean °F (°C)	3.0 (−16.1)	6.9 (−13.9)	7.4 (−13.7)	23.7 (−4.6)	40.1 (4.5)	49.2 (9.6)	52.4 (11.3)	46.8 (8.2)	36.2 (2.3)	23.3 (−4.8)	9.0 (−12.8)	6.4 (−14.2)	25.4 (−3.7)
Mean daily minimum °F (°C)	−3.8 (−19.9)	−0.3 (−17.9)	−0.1 (−17.8)	16.2 (−8.8)	32.9 (0.5)	42.3 (5.7)	46.0 (7.8)	41.4 (5.2)	31.4 (−0.3)	18.3 (−7.6)	3.1 (−16.1)	−0.5 (−18.1)	18.9 (−7.3)
Mean minimum °F (°C)	−29.4 (−34.1)	−27.0 (−32.8)	−23.0 (−30.6)	−5.1 (−20.6)	18.5 (−7.5)	32.2 (0.1)	37.0 (2.8)	32.5 (0.3)	20.1 (−6.6)	2.1 (−16.6)	−17.5 (−27.5)	−23.4 (−30.8)	−32.9 (−36.1)
Record low °F (°C)	−40 (−40)	−42 (−41)	−37 (−38)	−25 (−32)	1 (−17)	21 (−6)	29 (−2)	27 (−3)	12 (−11)	−12 (−24)	−29 (−34)	−38 (−39)	−42 (−41)
Average precipitation inches (mm)	0.75 (19)	0.87 (22)	0.64 (16)	0.70 (18)	1.27 (32)	2.33 (59)	3.52 (89)	3.07 (78)	2.16 (55)	1.23 (31)	0.89 (23)	0.68 (17)	18.11 (459)
Average extreme snow depth inches (cm)	13.6 (35)	14.1 (36)	15.3 (39)	17.1 (43)	14.0 (36)	0.4 (1.0)	0.0 (0.0)	1.1 (2.8)	3.6 (9.1)	7.7 (20)	10.7 (27)	11.6 (29)	19.4 (49)
Average precipitation days (≥ 0.01 in)	5.2	5.0	4.5	4.5	6.0	9.3	12.5	12.3	11.3	7.7	6.2	5.4	89.9
Source 1: XMACIS2
Source 2: NOAA (precipitation)
