= Eureka Dome =

Highest point
- Elevation: 1,082 m (3,550 ft)
- Coordinates: 63°32′12″N 138°48′48″W

Geography
- Location: Yukon, Canada
- Parent range: Ogilvie Mountains
- Topo map: NTS 115O10 Granville

Eureka Dome is a mountain in the Ogilvie Mountains of Yukon, Canada. The trail for the Yukon Quest 1,000-mile sled dog race passes over the mountain every February.
