= List of Fetch! with Ruff Ruffman episodes =

This is a list of episodes of the PBS Kids Go! children's television series Fetch! with Ruff Ruffman.

== Series overview ==
Season	Episodes	Originally released		Winner
Season	Episodes	First released	Last released	Winner
1	20	May 29, 2006	June 29, 2006	Anna Sheridan
2	20	May 28, 2007	June 28, 2007	Michael "Mike" Spence
3	20	September 29, 2008	October 30, 2008	Jay Brosnan
4	20	September 11, 2009	October 15, 2009	Liza Giangrande
5	20	October 4, 2010	November 4, 2010	Marc "Marco" Frongillo

== Season 1 (2006) ==
=== Contestants ===
- Noah Ellis
- Khalil Flemming
- Taylor Garron
- Brian McGoff
- Julia Millstein
- Anna Sheridan

=== Episodes ===
No. overall	No. in season	Title	Directed by	Written by	Original release date	Prod. code
1	1	"3-2-1 Blast Off!"	Joshua Seftel	Jim Conroy and Glen Berger	May 29, 2006 (Note: This episode was first released online on May 22, 2006, one week prior to the broadcast premiere.) (Note: The first four episodes premiered back-to-back on some local PBS stations on Memorial Day, May 29, 2006.)	101
Ruff is frazzled. He needs more time to get his first show ready, but unfortunately, he is live on the air. What to do? The show must go on. Ruff sends Julia, Anna, and Khalil to meet a big star. They arrive at the Museum of Science to discover that the star is the Sun and that they are about to blast off on an amazing space race. Taylor, Brian, and Noah stay behind for the Half-Time Quiz Show.
2	2	"Good Dancing and Bad Breath"	Joshua Seftel	Jim Conroy and Glen Berger	May 30, 2006	102
Ruff wants to try out some new dance moves on his poodle neighbor Charlene. He remembers her telling him one time that he has "Halitosis", but is horrified when he learns that Halitosis means bad breath. He decides to send Julia and Khalil to learn how to ballroom dance, and Brian and Anna out to prove that dog mouths are cleaner than human mouths. Taylor and Noah stay behind for the Half-Time Quiz Show.
3	3	"How to Get Out Your Inner Hip Hop"	Joshua Seftel	Jim Conroy and Glen Berger	May 31, 2006	103
Ruff incinerates his daily ration of kibble in the Fetch 3000 but then discovers he is out of Chinese food. Resorting to desperate measures, Ruff must try to extract a treat from a dog toy. Ruff challenges Anna to "cook" on the dance floor as she learns how to dance hip-hop. Meanwhile, Noah, Khalil, and Julia must cook for a crowd of animals at the zoo. Brian and Taylor stay behind for the Half-Time Quiz Show.
4	4	"Cats? I Thought You Said Kites!"	Joshua Seftel	Jim Conroy and Glen Berger	June 1, 2006	104
Ruff is excited because he thinks today's episode is all about kites! Until he gets a call from his boss Henry, who wants the show to be about cats. Ruff has no choice but to give airtime to cats as he challenges Taylor and Anna to train a cat to fetch. Meanwhile, Noah and Brian must design, build and fly a kite that will lift a dog biscuit in the air and land it on Charlene's porch. Khalil and Julia stay behind for the Half-Time Quiz Show.
5	5	"Ye Olde Colonial Episode"	Joshua Seftel	Jim Conroy and Glen Berger	June 5, 2006	105
Losing power in the doghouse gives Ruff an idea. All he needs is a $250,000,000 advance from his boss, Henry, to buy a time machine to send the Fetchers back to 1627. Dressed as colonists, the cast members abandon their video games and cell phones for log sawing, oven starting, jaw harping, goat tending, and lessons in colonial life.
6	6	"Saturday Night with a Slight Fever"	Joshua Seftel	Jim Conroy and Glen Berger	June 6, 2006	106
Ruff has lined up an "easily recognizable" major pop star for today's challenge-producing and directing a music video. When his talent cancels and his "handy electronic device filled with hard-to-get phone numbers" falls into his soup, Ruff must come up with a replacement, and quick. Good thing Ruff has found stars for the video he is sure Taylor, Brian, and Noah will recognize-their grandparents; which is to recreate the music video for the song "Saturday Night" by Aaron Carter. Julia, Khalil, and Anna stay behind for the Half-Time Quiz Show.
7	7	"To Bee or Not to Bee"	Joshua Seftel	Jim Conroy and Glen Berger	June 7, 2006	107
Ruff has just finished shooting his first FETCH promo, "Busy As a Bee", but cannot get out of his bee costume because the zipper is broken. Bees on the brain, Ruff challenges Brian and Khalil to learn how to be beekeepers. Anna and Julia's challenge has nothing to do with bees-they must learn how to windsurf with the help of windsurfing champion, Nevin Sayre. Noah and Taylor stay behind for the Half-Time Quiz Show.
8	8	"B.L.T. for Breakfast"	Joshua Seftel	Jim Conroy and Glen Berger	June 8, 2006	108
Ever the entrepreneur, Ruff has invested the entire show's budget in his latest culinary creation: the Liver and Pineapple Biscuit Shake. Looking for ways to improve his recipe, Ruff sends Taylor, Khalil, and Noah out to invent a new flavor of ice cream (the three main ingredients have to start with the letters B, L, and T and two of them have to be vegetables), and Brian must fill in as a short order cook at a local diner. Brian also has to make breakfast for his family. Julia and Anna stay behind for the Half-Time Quiz Show.
9	9	"The Mystery of the Missing Thing in the Haunted Castle"	Joshua Seftel	Jim Conroy and Glen Berger	June 12, 2006	109
Ruff tells the kids about the legend of his great, great, great, great, great, great grandfather Ruffael Ruffmanowitz who lived in spooky Hammond Castle with the famed inventor John Hayes Hammond. Ruff sends all of the Fetchers out to Hammond Castle to retrieve Ruffmanowitz's lost invention.
10	10	"This Old...Lemonade Stand"	Joshua Seftel	Jim Conroy and Glen Berger	June 13, 2006	110
In a slight lapse of fiscal judgment, Ruff decides to buy the Apple-Peeler 2.0, reducing the show's budget to 13 cents. He decides to recruit Anna and Noah to earn some quick cash by building their own lemonade stand with the help of master carpenter Norm Abram. Taylor, Khalil, Brian, and Julia stay behind for the Half-Time Quiz Show.
11	11	"It's Raining Cats and Dogs"	Joshua Seftel	Jim Conroy and Glen Berger	June 14, 2006	111
Ruff, in an artistic mood, is working on putting the finishing touches on his latest masterpiece when he hears thunder outside his doghouse. Having just heard the weather announcer on W-O-O-F predict clear skies, a confused Ruff is determined to figure out what is going on. He sends Taylor to learn how to forecast the weather, while Noah, Khalil, and Brian join the city's mural crew in planning and painting a mural for a local pizzeria. Anna and Julia stay behind for the Half-Time Quiz Show.
12	12	"That Doesn't Float My Boat"	Joshua Seftel	Jim Conroy and Glen Berger	June 15, 2006	112
Trying to relieve a bad case of "Game Show Host Block", Ruff falls asleep and leaves the water in the bathtub running. This floods his doghouse, giving him the perfect idea for today's challenge: Khalil, Anna, and Julia must design a boat out of materials they find at the dump. Their boat has to float, it has to be stable and steer-able, and it has to be propelled by something other than oars. Brian, Taylor, and Noah stay behind for the Half-Time Quiz Show.
13	13	"Send in the Clowns"	Joshua Seftel	Jim Conroy and Glen Berger	June 19, 2006	113
Ruff plans on getting back at the Great Spotinsky, the now-famous circus dog responsible for cheating Ruff out of his dream job. Ruff sends Brian out to the big top to get some circus pointers, and Taylor, Julia, Anna, and Noah set out to design a water balloon launcher. Khalil stays behind for the Half-Time Quiz Show.
14	14	"Grandma Ruffman's Recipe for Success"	Joshua Seftel	Jim Conroy and Glen Berger	June 20, 2006	114
Grandma Ruffman wants Ruff to sell a few hundred thousand copies of her cookbook on his show, but she thinks her grandson needs to be much funnier to garner the ratings he will need to move the product. So Ruff sends Taylor, Brian, and Noah out to cook Grandma's recipes on a farm, and Grandma sends Khalil out to learn how to tell jokes from a professional comedian. Julia and Anna stay behind for the Half-Time Quiz Show.
15	15	"Tryin' Chef"	Joshua Seftel	Jim Conroy and Glen Berger	June 21, 2006	115
When Ruff's owner brings home a "doggy bag" consisting of one measly dinner roll, Ruff decides that his evening meal needs to get "kicked up a notch". He challenges Taylor, Khalil, Brian, and Julia to use creativity, cunning, and capability in a cooking contest. Anna and Noah stay behind for the Half-Time Quiz Show.
16	16	"Don't Put the Kart Before the Sea Lion"	Joshua Seftel	Jim Conroy and Glen Berger	June 22, 2006	116
Ruff is learning how to drive using his new Driver Simulation Program for Dogs. Problems ensue as he veers off the course and into a sea lion tank, but this vehicular disaster provides Ruff with two great ideas for today's show: Taylor trains sea lions at the New England Aquarium, and Julia becomes the pit crew chief for a professional junior go-karter. Khalil, Brian, Noah, and Anna stay behind for the Half-Time Quiz Show.
17	17	"Relaxin' with Ruff"	Joshua Seftel	Jim Conroy and Glen Berger	June 26, 2006	117
Ruff decides to turn over a new leaf so that the stress of running a TV show will no longer get to him. He sends the FETCHers to a spa to learn about yoga and how to get their heart rates down, then it is on to an amusement park (Canobie Lake Park) to get their pulses racing and scientifically measure their "fear factor".
18	18	"Scat Cat, Scat"	Joshua Seftel	Jim Conroy and Glen Berger	June 27, 2006	118
There has been a break-in! While Ruff was away at a Canine-Television-Entertainment-Convention, someone broke into his doghouse and stole his new kneeboard. He sends Noah out to learn the ins and outs of knee boarding, while Julia, Anna, and Taylor learn how to track animals. Khalil and Brian stay behind for the Half-Time Quiz Show.
19	19	"Ruff Ruffman Spaces Out"	Joshua Seftel	Jim Conroy and Glen Berger	June 28, 2006	119
Ruff's communication satellite is on the blink, in desperate need of repair. He would fix it himself, but he cannot fit into the old spacesuit from his doggie cosmonaut days. This is where the Fetchers come in: Ruff sends them all to the Space Camp for astronaut training.
20	20	"The Dogcathalon Finale"	Joshua Seftel	Jim Conroy and Glen Berger	June 29, 2006	120
After an incredible season of earning points from wild-and occasionally ridiculous-challenges, the Great Dane of all episodes is here. In this grand finale, Ruff must award the season's grand prize, which he still has not come up with yet. Three elimination rounds of competition will pit Noah, Khalil, Julia, Brian, Anna, and Taylor against each other.

=== Point Totals Before Finale ===
1. Anna – 1,421 points
2. Noah – 1,420 points
3. Khalil – 1,415 points
4. Julia – 1,406 points
5. Brian – 1,405 points
6. Taylor – 1,400 points

=== Points Chart ===
Contestants	Ep 1	Ep 2	Ep 3	Ep 4	Ep 5	Ep 6	Ep 7	Ep 8	Ep 9	Ep 10	Ep 11	Ep 12	Ep 13	Ep 14	Ep 15	Ep 16	Ep 17	Ep 18	Ep 19	Ep 20
Khalil	85	85	90	35	125	45	90	75	100	55	80	90	40	90	75	35	95	35	90	1415
Julia	80	85	100	35	105	45	91	35	105	55	45	85	70	45	75	75	90	70	110	1406
Anna	80	95	90	75	110	45	96	35	105	80	45	95	100	45	40	35	95	65	90	1421
Noah	40	45	90	65	125	95	45	75	100	75	80	40	100	80	40	35	95	105	90	1420
Brian	40	95	40	65	125	90	70	80	100	55	85	40	85	80	90	35	100	35	95	1405
Taylor	40	45	40	80	100	90	45	75	100	55	95	40	70	85	100	90	90	70	90	1400

- Fetcher stayed in Studio for that episode
- Fetcher was the winner for the day

=== Final results ===
- Season 1 Champion: Anna
- 2nd Place: Khalil
- 3rd Place: Noah
- 4th Place: Brian
- 5th Place: Julia
- 6th Place: Taylor

== Season 2 (2007) ==
=== Contestants ===
- Madison "Madi" Bader
- William "Willie" Bornkessel
- Rosario Corso
- Bridget O'Sullivan
- Michael "Mike" Spence
- Nina Wadekar

=== Episodes ===
No. overall	No. in season	Title	Directed by	Written by	Original release date	Prod. code
21	1	"Ruff Ruffman Breaks the Mold"	Paul Serafini	Jim Conroy	May 28, 2007	201
Ruff accidentally sent a letter to every newspaper about a mold problem after having trouble with his snack molds. Ruff has a new cat assistant, Princess Blossom Pepperdoodle Von Yum Yum, who he must work with to save the show and solve his mold problem. He sends Madi and Nina to visit a chocolate factory and learn how to make chocolate candy; however, they quickly learn that it's not as easy as it looks, and that they must work together to accomplish their challenge. Meanwhile, Mike and Willie investigate the microbial world of germs and discover which places in Mike's house are the "germiest". With the help of a public health expert, the boys swab several locations in Mike's house, then go to a lab to grow the germs in culture and analyze their growth to determine which place has the most germs. Bridget and Rosario stay behind for the Half-Time Quiz Show.
22	2	"Ruff's Case of Blues in the Brain"	Paul Serafini	Jim Conroy	May 29, 2007	202
Willie and Madi must use non-verbal forms of communication to complete their challenge-making art and music with the Blue Man Group while Bridget and Mike must determine whether the old myth is true that humans use only 10% of their brains. First, they meet up with a neurologist to learn about the brain, then visit a neuroscientist at an MRI lab to devise an experiment that will help them figure out whether people really use more than 10% of their brains. Nina and Rosario stay behind for the Half-Time Quiz Show.
23	3	"You Lucky Dog"	Paul Serafini	Jim Conroy	May 30, 2007	203
Nina, Rosario, and Mike must build a homemade go-kart out of junk that can coast downhill, steer, and brake. An expert soap box derby car builder is on hand to teach them about the importance of gravity, friction, and drag in go-kart racing. The kids design and build their own go-kart, make adjustments, and finally compete in a race against a real Soap Box Derby car. Meanwhile, Bridget meets up with a Chinese culture expert to learn the traditions behind the Chinese Dragon Boat Festival (held every year to bring luck and prosperity). In addition to boat racing, Bridget learns many of the cultural traditions behind the festival, including how to make zongzi. Willie and Madi stay behind for the Half-Time Quiz Show.
24	4	"Ruff's Big Break"	Paul Serafini	Jim Conroy	May 31, 2007	204
When Ruff wants to prove that his new "Action to the Max-ion" toy is really based on him, he does karate chop dance moves on a fence, but falls and breaks his leg. While being forced to wear a cone and a cast for the rest of the episode, he sends Mike and Willie to learn about the human balance system. They visit an otologist and learn that the brain uses input from the eyes, muscles, and inner ear to stay balanced. To investigate this further, the kids perform tests to see what happens when the three inputs are missing or distorted. Then they suit up in a Ruff costume and demonstrate their newfound balance wisdom to Ruff by balancing over a pit of shaving cream! At the same time, Bridget and Rosario learn how to design and make puppets and then perform a puppet show for the kids in a hospital in an attempt to prove to Ruff that hospitals aren't scary. Nina and Madi stay behind for the Half-Time Quiz Show.
25	5	"The Mystery of DogTopia and Catlantis"	Paul Serafini	Jim Conroy	June 4, 2007	205
Ruff sends all six Fetchers out on a mysterious island adventure to learn why cats and dogs don't get along. The kids are broken into two teams and must solve riddles that guide them through the mystery. Challenges include using pulleys to lift a heavy boat and creating an electromagnet out of a battery, nail, and wire.
26	6	"Reducing the Calories and Cats in Your Life"	Paul Serafini	Jim Conroy	June 5, 2007	206
Ruff gets angered over Blossom's drawing of him doing the Downward Facing Dog pose, to the point where he tries to send her to another foster home. Mike and Nina must make a healthy version of Ruff's favorite pizza. They meet up with a chef and learn about nutrition, including the five food groups and calories. After they perfect their recipe, they must serve it to Nina's school cafeteria, and get at least 75% of the student body to give it a thumbs up! Meanwhile, Madi and Bridget volunteer at an animal shelter, and match cats and kittens with friends and families who want to adopt them. Willie and Rosario stay behind for the Half-Time Quiz Show.
27	7	"I'm Okay, You're Okra"	Paul Serafini	Jim Conroy	June 6, 2007	207
Madi and Mike are challenged to prove that dogs have a soothing effect on people. They visit a pediatrician and learn about how the body responds to stressful situations. Then, the kids create a data collection study that measures the pulses of people before and after playing with dogs. They try to find out whether patients feel calmer in the presence of dogs. Ruff sends Nina and Rosario to the Louisiana Bayou to learn how to make gumbo and learn about the rich cultural heritage of New Orleans. Willie and Bridget stay behind for the Half-Time Quiz Show.
28	8	"The Small Fork is for Dessert (Unless You're a Dolphin)"	Paul Serafini	Jim Conroy	June 7, 2007	208
Grandma Ruffman returns! Appalled by Ruff's manners, Grandma sends Rosario and Nina to learn proper table manners and how to plan a party from an etiquette expert. She also sends Willie, who went to Florida to compete against Calvin the dolphin at the Living Seas Exhibit at Epcot. Willie must compete against Calvin in tests of jumping, swimming, and holding his breath. Willie learns about how the dolphin's anatomy and physiology are adapted to an aquatic environment. Then in a re-match, Willie must make some modifications to his body based on what he's learned. Mike, Madi, and Bridget stay behind for the Half-Time Quiz Show.
29	9	"Roughing It with Ruff"	Paul Serafini	Jim Conroy	June 11, 2007	209
Fearing that he is being forced to live out in the wild, Ruff sends the kids into the wilderness to meet with a survival-training expert and learn the ways of the woods. The kids learn what it takes to stay alive if you are lost in the forest. On the first day, two teams of kids design and build shelters that are safe, waterproof, and windproof. After it gets dark, they learn different methods for starting and maintaining fires. On the second day, kids put their survival skills to use in a race to see which team can get rescued first.
30	10	"Ruff's Bowling is Going Downhill"	Paul Serafini	Jim Conroy	June 12, 2007	210
Willie and Bridget go on a quest to build a bowling machine. First, they meet up with an engineer to learn about the physics of bowling. Then, the kids put their knowledge to use, designing and building a machine that can bowl well. After testing and refining their machine, they use it to compete against "Throbot", a multimillion-dollar bowling machine. Meanwhile, Rosario heads to the mountains to learn how to snowboard. Mike, Nina, and Madi stay behind for the Half-Time Quiz Show.
31–32	11–12	"Mush If By Land, Mush Mush If By Sea"	Paul Serafini	Jim Conroy	June 14, 2007	211-212
In this two-part episode, Madi and Rosario are challenged to get a message to Ruff's friend in Hawaii – even though Ruff has only sent them as far as Colorado. They learn about reading topographical maps and compasses, and get on a dogsled to cross the Continental Divide and throw Ruff's message into a westward flowing river, trusting that it will eventually find its way to Hawaii. Willie and Nina embark on a race following Paul Revere's famous ride through the streets of Boston. They must solve puzzles and learn about the Revolutionary War to complete the challenge. Bridget and Mike stay behind for the Half-Time Quiz Show.
33	13	"Yippie Tie Yie Yay, Get Along Little Doggies"	Paul Serafini	Jim Conroy	June 18, 2007	213
Ruff sends all six FETCHers to Colorado to work as cowhands on a real working cattle ranch. They experience the life of true cowboys and cowgirls. Activities include: learning to ride a horse, roping, western dancing and cattle herding. The kids also learn about geology and mineralogy by panning for gold.
34	14	"Tape Loops and Loop-the-Loops"	Paul Serafini	Jim Conroy	June 19, 2007	214
Madi and Mike head off to a recording studio to work with a professional musician to record an original song for Ruff's grandma. Bridget and Willie spent the day at Walt Disney World designing a roller coaster. They meet with two Imagineers, Bernie and Jason to learn how to design a coaster and about the forces and motion at work, including gravity and inertia. Then, they build a physical model to try out their ideas for a Hawaiian themed roller coaster. Finally, they program their coaster design and "ride" their creation in a full-motion, virtual reality simulator. Rosario and Nina stay behind for the Half-Time Quiz Show.
35	15	"A Lobster Bake? Oh Buoy!"	Paul Serafini	Jim Conroy	June 20, 2007	215
Nina and Willie must learn how to scuba dive, and then design lifting devices for sunken items at the bottom of the ocean using what they know about buoyancy. Nina also learns about facing her fears and respecting her limits in the water. While Bridget and Rosario are sent out to spend the day on a lobster boat and learn that catching lobsters is hard work! Madi and Mike stay behind for the Half-Time Quiz Show.
36	16	"How to Get Dogs and Doggerel in Better Shape"	Paul Serafini	Jim Conroy	June 21, 2007	216
Madi, Mike, and Willie must learn about getting fit from a fitness expert who demonstrates the three components of exercise: aerobic activity, strength training, and flexibility. Then, they head outdoors to design a workout for their families using simple objects from around the house. Nina learns the art of writing poetry and then must compete in a poetry slam competition! Rosario and Bridget stay behind for the Half-Time Quiz Show.
37	17	"Scruff Ruffman At Large!"	Paul Serafini	Jim Conroy	June 25, 2007	217
Rosario, Nina, and Bridget are given clues to decipher a secret map through one of Colorado's oldest caves. They have to search the cave for geological objects that will help them uncover hidden objects in the cave. Madi is challenged to learn the flying trapeze. Willie and Mike stay behind for the Half-Time Quiz Show.
38	18	"Take Me Out to the Fashion Show"	Paul Serafini	Jim Conroy	June 26, 2007	218
Mike heads out to the Lowell Spinners' minor-league ballpark to learn the science of pitching strikes from Justin Masterson. He learns about the forces and motion behind different pitches. He then learns about the bio-mechanics behind successful pitching and fine-tunes his own pitching technique. Just when he thinks the day is over, Ruff calls in and ups the ante-Mike must throw out the first pitch at tonight's game-in front of 5,000 baseball fans! Bridget, Madi, and Rosario meet up with a fashion designer, and learn how to design and construct high fashion-for dogs! Nina and Willie stay behind for the Half-Time Quiz Show.
39	19	"CSI Ruff"	Paul Serafini	Jim Conroy	June 27, 2007	219
When Blossom gives Ruff a makeover when the latter decides to pick up the grandprize from Dogwarts, Ruff's old obedience school. Ruff gets so embarrassed to the point he has all six kids go pick it up for him. But the Grand Prize is stolen, now all the Fetchers are suspects. Working with forensic scientists, the kids must collect and analyze evidence to clear their own names and find the real culprit. In doing so, they learn about the physical characteristics that some humans share (such as shoe size, and hair color) and the characteristics that are unique to individuals (such as DNA and fingerprints). Boston Police officers and forensic scientists work with kids throughout the evidence collection process, by identifying stray hairs, lifting fingerprints found at the scene, and investigating footprints and DNA.
40	20	"The Grand Prizeless Grand Finale"	Paul Serafini	Jim Conroy	June 28, 2007	220
It's the season 2 finale, and Ruff is about to be sent to Poodle Island for being accused of stealing the Grand Prize, but he isn't going to let it ruin the final episode! All six kids compete in a final competition to determine the Grand Champion. Rounds include physical challenges, a building challenge in which Rosario, Bridget, Willie, and Mike must engineer a device to catch a watermelon without breaking it, and a trivia challenge that pits Willie and Mike against one another recalling science facts, solving word scrambles, and identifying details from previous challenges. At the end of the show, Mike and Willie must select items that they think will float. Once Willie selects an item that sinks, Mike was crowned the second FETCH! Grand Champion.

=== Point Totals Before Finale ===
1. Mike – 1,325 points
2. Rosario – 1,320 points
3. Bridget – 1,315 points
4. Willie – 1,305 points
5. Nina – 1,290 points
6. Madi – 1,285 points

=== Points Chart ===
Contestants	Ep 1	Ep 2	Ep 3	Ep 4	Ep 5	Ep 6	Ep 7	Ep 8	Ep 9	Ep 10	Ep 11 / 12	Ep 13	Ep 14	Ep 15	Ep 16	Ep 17	Ep 18	Ep 19	Ep 20
Nina	90	40	80	35	90	95	85	75	75	30	75	80	40	80	100	85	40	95	1290
Madi	85	85	50	35	100	65	65	50	75	30	80	80	85	45	85	95	80	95	1285
Willie	75	80	50	80	90	35	45	85	100	90	75	80	75	85	85	40	40	95	1305
Mike	65	80	80	85	90	85	70	50	100	30	35	100	90	45	85	40	100	95	1325
Rosario	35	40	80	85	90	35	90	75	80	95	85	95	40	75	40	90	95	95	1320
Bridget	35	80	100	90	90	65	45	50	100	85	35	80	75	80	40	85	80	100	1315

- Fetcher stayed in Studio for that Episode
- Fetcher was the winner for the day

=== Final results ===
- Season 2 Champion: Mike
- 2nd Place: Willie
- 3rd Place: Bridget
- 4th Place: Rosario
- 5th Place: Madi
- 6th Place: Nina

== Season 3 (2008) ==
=== Contestants ===
- Harsha Amaravadi
- Jay Brosnan
- Samuel "Sam" Blumenfeld
- Samantha "Sammy" Boucher
- Demetrius Joseph "DJ" Thomas
- Noel Um

=== Episodes ===
No. overall	No. in season	Title	Directed by	Written by	Original release date	Prod. code
41	1	"The Debut of Smell-O-Vision"	Paul Serafini	Jim Conroy	September 29, 2008	301
After Ruff is sprayed by a skunk, Blossom sends DJ and Harsha to track skunks and find out how to use chemistry to neutralize skunk spray while Jay and Sam learn to "brave the waves" and become junior lifeguards. Sammy and Noel stay behind for the Half-Time Quiz Show.
42	2	"When Home is a House of Cards"	Paul Serafini	Jim Conroy	September 30, 2008	302
Blossom is promoted as Ruff's boss; Ruff hires a new assistant, a mouse named Chet. Ruff is practicing for the Go Fish Tournament hosted by his cousin Bluff Ruffman. Ruff sends Sam and Sammy to the MSPCA to make a promotional video and Jay and Noel meet up with a famous cardstacker to build a tower of cards. DJ and Harsha stay behind for the Half-Time Quiz Show.
43	3	"Just Call Him "Spot""	Paul Serafini	Jim Conroy	October 1, 2008	303
DJ, Jay, and Sam meet with a chemistry expert to learn how to fight stains and Ruff sends Noel to a fire academy so she can learn how to fight fires. In the middle of the show, Noel must save Ruff's kibble from burning after Chet sends it to a fire site! Meanwhile, Sammy and Harsha stayed in Studio G.
44	4	"Mr. Ruffman Goes to Washington"	Paul Serafini	Jim Conroy	October 2, 2008	304
To his dismay, Ruff finds out that it's against the law for a dog to host a reality game show. Wanting to overturn it, Ruff decides to run for Local Dog Officer of Canine-Human Affairs, but he needs to know more about the job of an elected official. Through his canine connection with a dog named Splash, Ruff sends Sam to a high-level meeting with Senator Ted Kennedy, while Noël, Sammy and DJ are challenged to design a float for his campaign. Meanwhile, Jay and Harsha stayed in Studio G.
45	5	"Mission Improbable"	Paul Serafini	Jim Conroy	October 6, 2008	305
During a momentary lapse in judgment, Ruff pawns the Ruffman Family Dog Collar. When Ruff tries to get the collar back, he realizes that it's now in the hands of enemy operative and master of disguise, Ken L. Koff (a play on the common canine disease Kennel cough.) Ruff sends the FETCHers to the Spy Museum in Washington D.C. for training to become secret agents. Their mission is to track down and retrieve the Ruffman Family Dog Collar from the international supervillain.
46	6	"How Not to Impress a Poodle's Mother"	Paul Serafini	Jim Conroy	October 7, 2008	306
Ruff has finally figured out how to get Charlene the poodle to fall for him: by impressing her mother. Ruff learns that Charlene's mother's name is Nell, so he sends Sam, Harsha and DJ to the beach to sculpt a giant letter "N" in her honor. Also, to prepare for his date, Ruff dispatches Jay to a salon so he can learn about hair and beauty. Noel and Sammy stay behind for the Half-Time Quiz Show.
47	7	"There's Food Safety and Then There's Food Safety"	Paul Serafini	Jim Conroy	October 8, 2008	307
Ruff has discovered a tortilla chip made out of him. Grandma Ruffman calls and sends Sam, Noel, and Harsha to build a foolproof structure that can protect a tortilla chip and her cake. Meanwhile, Sammy visits Spanish Harlem in New York City. Jay and DJ stay behind for the Half-Time Quiz Show.
48	8	"Do-Se-Dos and Do-Se-Don'ts"	Paul Serafini	Jim Conroy	October 9, 2008	308
Ruff feels depressed because he accidentally painted his doghouse "Dingy Gray." To cheer himself up, Ruff sends Sammy and DJ to learn how to square dance. Realizing that being in an appealing environment is key to feeling good, he sends Harsha and Jay to the Franklin Park Zoo to learn about gorillas and their habitat. Sam and Noel stay behind for the Half-Time Quiz Show.
49	9	"The DogVinci Code"	Paul Serafini	Jim Conroy	October 13, 2008	309
Ruff's Uncle MacRuffmantosh returns with a new mystery. It seems that a sneaky society of cats has been hiding the secret behind the Mona Lisa's smile for over 500 years. MacRuffmantosh has uncovered a secret notebook with details that will reveal the truth; a notebook written by Leonardo da Vinci's dog, Dog Vinci.
50	10	"What's Bugging Ruff?"	Paul Serafini	Jim Conroy	October 14, 2008	310
Ruff wants to have a powwow (i.e. meeting) to troubleshoot a recent bug infestation in his doghouse. In order to learn more about powwows, he sends Harsha to Taos, New Mexico to participate in a real Native American powwow. Noël, Sammy and Jay are dispatched to Thompson Island to learn about insects and their habitats. Sam and DJ stay behind for the Half-Time Quiz Show.
51	11	"Will They Like the Show? It's a Shoe-In!"	Paul Serafini	Jim Conroy	October 15, 2008	311
DJ and Sammy head to a sneaker company to design and build more functional footwear while Jay and Sam learn the art of street performing and eventually put on a show for a crowd. Noel and Harsha stay behind for the Half-Time Quiz Show.
52	12	"Socket to Me"	Paul Serafini	Jim Conroy	October 16, 2008	312
Sam and Sammy work on helping him decrease his electricity consumption while Harsha and Noel get singing lessons and have to perform live. DJ and Jay stay behind for the Half-Time Quiz Show.
53	13	"Dog of the Rings"	Paul Serafini	Jim Conroy	October 20, 2008	313
The FETCH 3000 is on the blink and Glen, Ruff's techie teenage nephew, won't fix it unless Ruff sends his FETCHers to Wing's Castle. Glen is a live action role player, and was supposed to go on a LARPing adventure. Unfortunately, he caught a cold and can't go. Ruff agrees to send all the FETCHers, dressed as Elves, Dwarves and Wizards, on a mythic mission.
54	14	"Arrgh – All Me Eggs Are Cracked!"	Paul Serafini	Jim Conroy	October 21, 2008	314
Sammy and Jay go to the Florida Keys to search the ocean floor for a Ruffman family treasure and Sam and Harsha's challenge is to work at a grocery store and compete in a grocery-bagging showdown. Noel and DJ stay behind for the Half-Time Quiz Show.
55	15	"Feeling Sheepish, Ruff?"	Paul Serafini	Jim Conroy	October 22, 2008	315
Ruff sends Noel and DJ to learn to herd sheep, and Sam and Harsha to Utah where they learn about bighorn sheep and their habitat. Jay and Sammy stay behind for the Half-Time Quiz Show.
56	16	"I'll Ruff and I'll Ruff and I'll Blow Your House Down"	Paul Serafini	Jim Conroy	October 23, 2008	316
Ruff sends DJ out to a dog obedience school to become an expert trainer while Jay, Noel and Sammy go to an engineering school to construct a new home for Chet. Sam and Harsha stay behind for the Half-Time Quiz Show.
57	17	"The People vs. Grandma Ruffman"	Paul Serafini	Jim Conroy	October 27, 2008	317
Grandma's accused of trying to break Ruff's twin brother, Scruff Ruffman, out of prison! The FETCHers try the case with help from real lawyers in a real courtroom with a real judge. Plus, Rosario Corso from season 2 guest stars as a jury member.
58	18	"Just Toying with Ruff"	Paul Serafini	Jim Conroy	October 28, 2008	318
Ruff's "Action to the Max-ion" toy has gotten negative reception due to him injuring his leg over it last season, and while being asked by a reporter for his opinion about it, He's eating ice cream and gets a Brain Freeze. Harsha and Sammy become radio reporters and do a news piece on brain freeze while Noel and DJ invent a new Ruff Ruffman toy. Jay and Sam stay behind for the Half-Time Quiz Show.
59	19	"The Ol' Switcheroo"	Paul Serafini	Jim Conroy	October 29, 2008	319
Ruff sends DJ and Harsha out to engineer a "puck stopper" that he can use as goalie in a game with Scruff's hockey team while Jay and Noel learn how to live each other's daily lives with each of their families by trading places for the day. Sam and Sammy stay behind for the Half-Time Quiz Show.
60	20	"FETCH! with Scruff Ruffman Finale"	Paul Serafini	Jim Conroy	October 30, 2008	320
Ruff's twin brother Scruff has taken over FETCH! He devises a series of elimination rounds for the FETCHers that take place in a variety of Ruff and Scruff's important childhood memories. However, Ruff is once again left without a grand prize after accidentally destroying it with the security system's lasers he installed. At the end, Scruff steals all of Ruff's stuff (including The FETCH 3000 & Chet), and it turns out that FETCH! is canceled forever and Ruff is supposedly fired for good according to a fax. Jay was crowned the third FETCH! Grand Champion. Note: This is the last episode to be presented in Standard Definition.

=== Point Totals Before Finale ===
1. Harsha – 1,365 points
2. Jay – 1,355 points
3. Sammy – 1,350 points
4. Sam – 1,335 points
5. Noel – 1,330 points
6. DJ – 1,330 points

=== Points Chart ===
Contestants	Ep 1	Ep 2	Ep 3	Ep 4	Ep 5	Ep 6	Ep 7	Ep 8	Ep 9	Ep 10	Ep 11	Ep 12	Ep 13	Ep 14	Ep 15	Ep 16	Ep 17	Ep 18	Ep 19	Ep 20
Harsha	90	40	40	45	80	75	70	90	95	85	45	90	80	75	85	45	85	80	70	1365
DJ	80	40	75	80	80	75	50	85	80	45	75	30	80	40	90	85	80	85	75	1330
Sam	70	90	70	85	80	75	70	45	80	45	90	75	80	85	85	45	80	35	50	1335
Jay	70	85	70	45	100	85	50	90	80	80	85	30	80	80	40	80	80	35	90	1355
Sammy	25	90	40	80	80	45	80	95	80	95	75	75	80	80	40	80	80	80	50	1350
Noel	25	95	80	80	80	45	70	45	80	80	45	80	95	40	80	80	80	75	75	1330

- Fetcher stayed in studio for that episode
- Fetcher was the winner for the day

=== Final results ===
- Season 3 Champion: Jay
- 2nd Place: Harsha
- 3rd Place: Noel
- 4th Place: Sammy
- 5th Place: Sam
- 6th Place: DJ

== Season 4 (2009) ==
=== Contestants ===
- Isaac Bean
- Brian Conroy
- Liza Giangrande
- Bethany Owens
- Talia Patapoutian
- Sterling Singletary

=== Episodes ===
No. overall	No. in season	Title	Directed by	Written by	Original release date	Prod. code
61	1	"Season Four is Canceled"	Paul Serafini	Jim Conroy	September 11, 2009	401
The first episode of season 4 is an all-animated adventure. Picking up exactly after the events of last season's finale, Ruff believes that he's been fired by the new wealthy Australian owner of the TV network, Harriet Hackensack (who just happens to hate dogs), So Ruff, joined by Blossom, Chet and Gerry Geranium embarks on an epic journey (in an aquatic chicken-shaped doghouse powered by cooking oil) to get his job back. Along the way he enlists the help of his family and friends, including Uncle MacRuffmantosh, his brother Scruff, Grandma Ruffman, the dreaded ghost pirate Black Muzzle and nephew Glen. In the process, Ruff learns the real reason why Harriet hates dogs and the real reason why Scruff stole all of his stuff. Note 1: This episode was entirely animated, the first to do so. The FETCHers earned no points and were not shown until the end, when Ruff called them, telling them that they were picked for the show. Note 2: This is the first episode to be presented in High Definition.
62	2	"Don't Like Fencing? Try Fencing!"	Paul Serafini	Jim Conroy	September 15, 2009	402
Ruff is determined to find the lost Helmet of Victory – an old Ruffman family heirloom that is said to bestow success upon its wearer. Unfortunately, Ruff's owner has set up a new picket fence to keep him yard-bound. He sends Liza and Isaac to learn how to pole vault over the fence with help from Design Squad's Nathan Ball, and sends Bethany and Talia to build materials and learn how to build a fence, But Blossom changes their assignment into something else, learning everything they can about the sport of fencing. Brian and Sterling stay behind for the Half-Time Quiz Show.
63	3	"The RuffMeal Needs More Roughage"	Paul Serafini	Jim Conroy	September 16, 2009	403
To be a huge success, all Ruff's new "Ruff Meal" needs is a good jingle and about 50 pounds less packaging. He deploys Talia, Isaac, and Sterling to work with a chef to come up with a healthier, more sustainable lunch. He then sends Bethany to meet with Keith Lockhart and the Boston Pops to master "The Stars and Stripes Forever" for his jingle. Brian and Liza stay behind for the Half-Time Quiz Show.
64	4	"Ruff Pigs Out and Has a Whale of a Time"	Paul Serafini	Jim Conroy	September 17, 2009	404
Ruff's camera dog, Tank, is not the most reliable employee in the world, and Ruff is looking for his replacement. Meanwhile, Blossom informs him that pigs are actually smarter than dogs. Ruff sends Bethany and Brian out to prove Blossom wrong; and Sterling and Liza go to SeaWorld to see if Shamu could make a good replacement for Tank with help from orca trainer Dawn Brancheau. Isaac and Talia stay behind for the Half-Time Quiz Show.
65	5	"Ruff's Just Fueling Around"	Paul Serafini	Jim Conroy	September 21, 2009	405
Blossom has organized her own FETCH challenge: Two teams of FETCHers will compete in a 50-mile race, and the team that emits the least amount of CO2 wins. Unfortunately, neither Ruff nor Blossom can enjoy the race because they're stuck to each other for the entire episode.
66	6	"Finding Eight-Legged Tights Isn't Easy"	Paul Serafini	Jim Conroy	September 22, 2009	406
It turns out that Ruff has two phobias: spiders and ballet. Both phobias originated a ballet performance that Spot Spotnik sabotaged by swapping out fake spider with real ones. Ruff sends Sterling and Bethany to meet an arachnologist to work in a spider lab, and gives Brian another daunting assignment – becoming a ballet dancer. Isaac, Liza, and Talia stay behind for the Half-Time Quiz Show.
67	7	"Ruff Rocks the (Environmentally Sustainable) House!"	Paul Serafini	Jim Conroy	September 23, 2009	407
Ruff is excited about being invited to play rock music in South Carolina that is, until he realizes that his Swedish environmentalist-rock-star-cousin Ruf Rufman was actually invited to perform instead. To convince Ruf that he should play in the concert, Ruff sends Talia and Isaac to learn how to build a "Green" doghouse. He then sends Sterling and Liza to rock n' roll band camp. Brian and Bethany stay behind for the Half-Time Quiz Show.
68	8	"Doggie Duties"	Paul Serafini	Jim Conroy	September 24, 2009	408
Ruff's extremely heavy Golden Blobby Trophy breaks his toilet. Even worse, the plumber can't come on time, and now Ruff has to go ...so badly. He tries to get through the show without an accident, and learns from Liza and Sterling all about "dog duties". He also finds out how astronauts deal with waste in space when he sends Bethany and Isaac to NASA to learn about recycling liquids on the International Space Station. Brian and Talia stay behind for the Half-Time Quiz Show.
69	9	"How Not to Impress the Press"	Paul Serafini	Jim Conroy	September 28, 2009	409
To prep for his big spread in Canine Weekly Magazine, Ruff tries out a new beauty cream by mixing it on the stove... and it turns him into a turkey vulture! Not knowing if he'll turn back to normal, he sends all six FETCHers out to learn whatever they can about turkey vultures. Later they head to an ad agency to figure out how to improve the turkey vulture's image. It includes a younger version of season 5 contestant Marc!
70	10	"How to Break the Ice and Also Waddle on It"	Paul Serafini	Jim Conroy	September 29, 2009	410
Ruff is getting ready to attend the annual convention for ARGSHAABPO, the Animal Reality Game Show Host and Aquatic Bird Performer Organization. Unfortunately, the convention will be attended by penguins, and Ruff just can't seem to relate to them. So he sends Isaac to the New England Aquarium to learn about penguins, and Brian, Bethany, and Liza to learn the art of Improvisation. Talia and Sterling stay behind for the Half-Time Quiz Show.
71	11	"Blossom Bawls While Ruff Has a Ball with Balls"	Paul Serafini	Jim Conroy	September 30, 2009	411
Ruff is trying to market "Ruffball", a brand new game that's supposed to sweep the nation! Unfortunately, Ruffball is interesting for only about six seconds. Ruff sends Talia and Liza to meet with a physics teacher to learn how to make Ruffball more exciting; and he sends Sterling to a stadium to learn how to broadcast a baseball game on the radio. Isaac, Brian, and Bethany stay behind for the Half-Time Quiz Show.
72	12	"Ruff Bounces Back"	Paul Serafini	Jim Conroy	October 1, 2009	412
Ruff is under a lot of pressure. After waking up from a nightmare, he's recently heard that schnauzers are the most intelligent breed of dogs. Meanwhile, Chet has misheard Ruff and grated his final term paper for obedience school, which forces him to rewrite his entire assignment to avoid failing. So Ruff decides to send Talia and Isaac to determine which dog breed is the most intelligent. He sends Sterling and Brian to learn about pressure, specifically air pressure, as they play wheelchair basketball. Bethany and Liza stay behind for the Half-Time Quiz Show.
73	13	"Is It a Bird? Is It a Plane? It's Ruffmanman!"	Paul Serafini	Jim Conroy	October 5, 2009	413
Ruff's nephew Glen has learned that a mysterious villain, Gamma Ray Person, is trying to harness the electromagnetic spectrum for evil. He forces Ruff into a mask and tights to become television's newest superhero... Ruffmanman. They have the FETCHers assist in their mission becoming the Super FETCHers. "Reveal" at the show's end uses WorldWide Telescope.
74	14	"Shrimp a la Cart"	Paul Serafini	Jim Conroy	October 6, 2009	414
Ruff thinks his "Crustationery" is a great idea. Customers will write letters on crustaceans which will then be delivered across the Atlantic Ocean by racecar. The service will be a huge success... if you don't mind writing letters on crabs, shrimp, and lobsters. To kick off his new business venture, Ruff sends Talia out to become a deckhand on a shrimp boat, while Bethany, Brian, and Isaac learn how to drive racecars. Sterling and Liza stay behind for the Half-Time Quiz Show.
75	15	"Ruff Needs His Herring Checked"	Paul Serafini	Jim Conroy	October 7, 2009	415
Ruff has finally lost it! He's hearing a voice that no one else can hear. Even stranger, the voice is telling him to bake cookies to woo Charlene. Ruff's sanity is at stake as he sends Isaac and Liza to meet with an audiologist to find out everything they can about hearing. And just in case the voice is right about the cookies, he sends Sterling and Brian to a cookie company! Meanwhile, Bethany and Talia stayed in Studio G.
76	16	"LePurr Strikes (Laser/Candid Camera)"	Paul Serafini	Jim Conroy	October 8, 2009	416
A crime wave has hit the city! Blossom's twin sister, the sinister, disguise-wearing criminal LePurr, has been hitting up flower shops, by replacing flowers customers are sending to other people with disco music, and Ruff is determined to stop her! Ruff gets Brian to patrol a local flower shop, and he also sends Isaac out in disguise to try to trick Brian. He then sends Talia and Sterling to learn about laser light and optics, which they will use to dismantle the security system in LePurr's hideout! Meanwhile, instead of dismantling the security system, Liza and Bethany stay behind for the Half-Time Quiz Show.
77	17	"Ruff's Yard Sale Makes a Racket"	Paul Serafini	Jim Conroy	October 12, 2009	417
Ruff realizes that he's a horrible shopper, having bought an expensive sock at a yard sale and a broken tennis racket for an upcoming match against his nemesis Spot Spotnik. Ruff sends Liza and Talia to the headquarters of Wilson Sporting Goods to design a new tennis racket for him; and he gets some shopping tips from Bethany and Brian, as they head out to Brimfield Fair, the biggest flea market in the world! Isaac and Sterling stay behind for the Half-Time Quiz Show.
78	18	"Gearing Up for Getting Ruff's Goat"	Paul Serafini	Jim Conroy	October 13, 2009	418
All of the Cat Grooming shows are competing with Ruff's ratings and he's desperate to find the mythical Helmet of Victory that will reverse his fortunes. Uncle MacRuffmantosh calls with news that he thinks he's located the Helmet on a faraway mountaintop, so Ruff plans to ride his trusty tricycle up the mountain to retrieve the prize. So Ruff sends Brian, Bethany, and Talia to meet with a bicycle expert and physics professor. Meanwhile, in an effort to get some "grooming" into his show, he sends Liza to learn how to groom a goat. Sterling and Isaac stay behind for the Half-Time Quiz Show.
79	19	"How to Really Train Your Dog"	Paul Serafini	Jim Conroy	October 14, 2009	419
Uncle MacRuffmantosh is hot on the trail of the Helmet of Victory! He's chartered a train scheduled to arrive at the helmet's hidden location in Fort Myers, Florida-but the train is riddled with riddles... Ruff sends all six FETCHers to figure out the riddles on the train, which will unlock a mysterious briefcase. But that's not all the trouble the FETCHers face, they also come across a criminal disguised as an Inspector who wants the Helmet of Victory for himself.
80	20	"Fetch Finale IV: The Prophecy Fulfilled!"	Paul Serafini	Jim Conroy	October 15, 2009	420
The lost legendary Helmet of Victory is so close Ruff can almost TASTE it! He's just learned that the Helmet is somewhere in Old Sturbridge Village, a town that time forgot. The FETCHers head off to the village, and then undergo a series of elimination trials to retrieve the Helmet. The FETCHer who finds the Helmet will be the season 4 FETCH Grand Champion. At the end of this season, Ruff finds out that his parents are still alive. Liza was crowned the fourth FETCH! Grand Champion.

=== Point Totals Before Finale ===
1. Talia – 1,255 points
2. Sterling – 1,252.5 points
3. Isaac – 1,237.5 points
4. Liza – 1,215 points
5. Brian – 1,205 points
6. Bethany – 1,182.5 points

=== Points Chart ===
Contestants	Ep 1	Ep 2	Ep 3	Ep 4	Ep 5	Ep 6	Ep 7	Ep 8	Ep 9	Ep 10	Ep 11	Ep 12	Ep 13	Ep 14	Ep 15	Ep 16	Ep 17	Ep 18	Ep 19	Ep 20
Talia	0	80	90	50	65	35	85	25	80	40	75	80	85	80	35	95	85	85	85	1255
Isaac	0	85	85	50	62.5	35	80	85	95	75	25	80	85	75	75	85	40	35	85	1237.5
Liza	0	80	40	80	70	35	75	75	80	75	75	40	90	45	75	25	80	90	85	1215
Bethany	0	60	80	85	62.5	80	30	75	80	80	25	40	85	85	35	25	85	85	85	1182.5
Brian	0	35	40	80	65	85	30	25	85	75	25	80	85	75	80	80	95	85	90	1205
Sterling	0	35	85	80	62.5	75	75	80	85	40	90	85	85	45	85	85	40	35	85	1252.5

- Fetcher Stayed in Studio for that episode
- Fetcher was the winner for the day

=== Final results ===
- Season 4 Champion: Liza
- 2nd Place: Isaac
- 3rd Place: Talia
- 4th Place: Sterling
- 5th Place: Brian
- 6th Place: Bethany

== Season 5 (2010) ==
=== Contestants ===
- Rubye Peyser
- Emeline "Emmie" Atwood
- Marc "Marco" Frongillo
- Marc Prophet
- Jay Ricco
- Shreya Viswanathan

=== Episodes ===
No. overall	No. in season	Title	Directed by	Written by	Original release date	Prod. code
81	1	"Ruff Fetches the Fetchers"	Paul Serafini	Jim Conroy	October 4, 2010	501
Season 5 is about to start but Ruff has been so busy trying to find his long-lost parents, he's forgotten to choose his season 5 FETCHers! In this casting special, viewers get a behind-the-scenes look at how Ruff goes about picking his contestants: Marc, Jay, Emmie, Rubye, Marco, and Shreya. But then a hot new reality game show premieres, called "Go Get It!", that appears to plagiarize his show. Unfortunately, shortly after selecting his intrepid kids, Ruff loses them on the way to Studio G!
82	2	"Game Show Isle"	Paul Serafini	Jim Conroy	October 5, 2010	502
After losing his FETCHers at the end of the season 5 premiere, Ruff discovers that they're stranded on the mysterious Game Show Island. To get off the island and back to Studio G, they must find the "Fabulous Four" game show relics before sundown or they will be trapped on the island forever. Ruff also learns some important clues about the mysterious disappearance of his parents.
83	3	"You Can't Teach an Orange Dog New Tricks"	Paul Serafini	Jim Conroy; Peter Hirsch	October 6, 2010	503
Ruff's cousin Bluff Ruffman is about to send a gaggle of mysterious animals to the doghouse. In a panic, Ruff sends Marco and Shreya to Disney's Animal Kingdom to learn how to take care of animals. As a backup plan, Ruff wants to know how to make the animals disappear and sends Rubye to Las Vegas to learn some magic from Penn & Teller. Jay, Marc and Emmie stay behind for the Half-Time Quiz Show.
84	4	"The Ol' Shell Game"	Paul Serafini	Jim Conroy	October 7, 2010	504
Ruff calls his friend Crush, the sea turtle from Finding Nemo, who tells him that his turtle friends are in trouble. Ruff sends Marco and Shreya to Florida to learn about turtles and help turtle hatchlings on the beach. He also sends Jay to be a contestant on a mysterious radio game show, which turns out to be a prank set up by Spot Spotnik. Emmie, Marc and Rubye stay behind for the Half-Time Quiz Show.
85	5	"Ruffman Manor is Haunted!"	Paul Serafini	Jim Conroy	October 11, 2010	505
Ruff has just learned that he's set to inherit Ruffman Manor from his ancestor Maximilian Ruffman. The only problem... Ruffman Manor is said to be haunted. Ruff sends all six FETCHers out to check out the manor (aka the Harry Packer Mansion) and find out if it's safe for him to move in.
86	6	"It's Ruff in the Ring"	Paul Serafini	Jim Conroy; Eric Handler	October 12, 2010	506
Ruff gets accidentally booked in a boxing match against the legendary boxer Whipped Cream McGee, so he sends Shreya out to learn how to box, and sends Marc and Marco to engineer a safe boxing helmet for him. Jay, Emmie, and Rubye stay behind for the Half-Time Quiz Show.
87	7	"A Whole Flock of Cheese"	Paul Serafini	Jim Conroy	October 13, 2010	507
Chet has gone on a cheese craze, replacing everything in the doghouse with cheese. Inspiring Ruff to send Emmie on a cheese-themed challenge. In addition, Ruff is searching for his long-lost parents and decides to employ the help of a carrier pigeon. He sends Jay and Rubye out to learn about carrier pigeons and then compete in a race against one! Marc, Marco, and Shreya stay behind for the Half-Time Quiz Show.
88	8	"How Much Frosting Can You Bear?"	Paul Serafini	Jim Conroy	October 14, 2010	508
Grandma Ruffman takes over today's show. Her friends Fig and Tucker's persons are getting married, so she calls upon Ruff and the FETCHers to help her with the wedding gifts! She sends Rubye and Jay to meet up with some experts at the Grizzly & Wolf Discovery Center to engineer a bear-proof picnic basket for the couple. Meanwhile, Shreya, Emmie, Marc, and Marco bake the bride and groom's actual wedding cake!
89	9	"The Legend of Ruffman's Gold"	Paul Serafini	Jim Conroy	October 18, 2010	509
Ruff's ancestor Gus Ruffman is believed to have hidden gold in an abandoned mine somewhere in Colorado. He sends Jay, Marc, and Emmie to solve clues, find the mine, and most importantly, find the gold! Marco, Rubye, and Shreya stay behind for the Half-Time Quiz Show.
90	10	"Who Wants to Trade For Some Old Tracks?"	Paul Serafini	Jim Conroy	October 19, 2010	510
Someone has just stolen Ruff's garden gnome and he's determined to get it back! In fact, he's so obsessed that he hasn't bathed in several days and is covered in flies, prompting Charlene to send him some fly swatters. Ruff sends Marco and Emmie to the Amherst College Museum of Natural History to analyze the footprints left behind by the perpetrator who stole the garden gnome; while Rubye and Shreya try to barter the flyswatters for something better that Ruff can give to Charlene. Jay and Marc stay behind for the Half-Time Quiz Show.
91	11	"Eureka is Not a Brand of Dog Food"	Paul Serafini	Jim Conroy	October 20, 2010	511
Ruff's owner has rediscovered the joys of playing fetch with her dog. And Ruff is getting annoyed with that. So he sends Emmie and Shreya to build him a vehicle he can ride on so he doesn't have to run. Then, he sends Jay and Marco to invent another device that will make his life easier. Marc and Rubye stay behind for the Half-Time Quiz Show.
92	12	"That Sculpture Isn't Yours, It's Mime"	Paul Serafini	Jim Conroy	October 21, 2010	512
Ruff learns that he's horrible at charades. To help him figure out how to act without making a sound, he sends Emmie and Marc to meet some mimes and learn about miming. Then, he sends Jay and Rubye to learn how to make sculptures that move called kinetic sculptures. Marco and Shreya stay behind for the Half-Time Quiz Show.
93	13	"Look What the Dog Dug Up!"	Paul Serafini	Jim Conroy	October 25, 2010	513
When Ruff digs up a sarcophagus in his backyard, he's convinced it's an authentic Egyptian mummy, and he's also convinced it comes with a curse. He sends all six FETCHers to the Museum of Fine Arts to authenticate the artifact, and also to a carbon dating lab to verify the age of the mummy. Then, the kids go through Tomb, an Egypt-themed amusement park to solve the mystery of the mummy.
94	14	"Ruff Follows His Dream"	Paul Serafini	Jim Conroy	October 26, 2010	514
After Ruff has a dream about flying with an elephant, he decides to see if he can make his dream come true! He send to Marco off to Tennessee to the Elephant Sanctuary to learn what it takes to own and care for an elephant. Then, he sends Marc and Rubye to learn how to indoor skydive. Emmie, Shreya and Jay stay behind for the Half-Time Quiz Show.
95	15	"Birds Are Handy!"	Paul Serafini	Jim Conroy	October 27, 2010	515
Ruff's rock star cousin Ruf Rufman wants to record songbirds on his next album. So Ruff sends Jay and Emmie to meet with field biologists from the Teton Science Schools in Wyoming to work with songbirds in the field. He also sends Marc and Shreya to meet with a hand model due to a misunderstanding between the word "Hands" and the name "Hans". Marco and Rubye stay behind for the Half-Time Quiz Show.
96	16	"Wolfing Down Some Barbeque"	Paul Serafini	Jim Conroy	October 28, 2010	516
Ruff has a family reunion barbecue, and invites some distant relatives: wolves. He sends Emmie and Rubye to Yellowstone National Park to learn all about wolves, and Felipe sends Jay and Marc to South Carolina to make some authentic southern BBQ. Shreya and Marco stay behind for the Half-Time Quiz Show.
97	17	"Go Belugas Go!"	Paul Serafini	Jim Conroy	November 1, 2010	517
Fetch! competes with Go Get It!, the rival cat game show, in a synchronized swimming match, so he sends Marco, Rubye and Shreya to learn about synchronized swimming, and Marc to Mystic Aquarium to learn how beluga whales are adapted for the water. Jay and Emmie stay behind for the Half-Time Quiz Show.
98	18	"Snoop Dog "	Paul Serafini	Jim Conroy	November 2, 2010	518
Fetch!'s rival game show Go Get It! is produced by a mysterious organization called P.U.R.R.S. Ruff sends all six FETCHers to meet with a team of private investigators and learn how to become sleuths. Ruff and the FETCHers then try to use their sleuthing skills to get to the bottom of who is behind P.U.R.R.S.
99	19	"Long Glen Silver and the Pursuit of the Golden Fetchie!"	Paul Serafini	Jim Conroy	November 3, 2010	519
Ruff's nephew Glen has been playing a pirate-themed video game on the Go Get It! Website. Through this game, he's somehow gotten into the Go Get It! mainframe computer and discovers that they're hunting for something called The Golden Fetchie. Ruff wants to find the Fetchie first before P.U.R.R.S does, so he sends all six FETCHers off to the island. And at Glen's request, he makes them dress up as pirates. But then a cat from P.U.R.R.S comes to steal the Golden Fetchie. So all the FETCHers come back to Studio G. At the end, they find out that the Golden Fetchie isn't just a statue. It's a brainwashing device for world domination. At the end of the episode is stated by Grandma Ruffman that anyone who watches Go Get It! is going to think they're cats. That's why P.U.R.R.S is going to take over the world. They must be stopped before it's too late.
100	20	"The FETCH! Finale"	Paul Serafini	Jim Conroy	November 4, 2010	520
It all comes down to this! In the season 5 finale, Ruff has told Henry from the previous episode that P.U.R.R.S., the organization that runs Go Get It!, is an evil cat organization! P.U.R.R.S. plans to brainwash the entire country with a device that makes everyone think they're cats! P.U.R.R.S. is also responsible for the disappearance of Ruff's parents. After learning that P.U.R.R.S. headquarters is hidden somewhere inside a water park, Ruff sends the FETCHers to find a way inside. Now, all Ruff needs to do is stop the brainwashing device, find his parents, and crown a FETCH Grand Champion! All in a day's work for Ruff Ruffman! In the end, Ruff's parents are finally discovered and Marco becomes the fifth and final FETCH Grand Champion and takes home the Golden Fetchie. The series ends with Ruff Ruffman's farewell song. He sings it with the Golden Microphone that makes any singing voice sound great, before his father tells him that it's actually broken.

=== Point Totals Before Finale ===
1. Rubye – 1,307 points
2. Emmie – 1,306 points
3. Shreya – 1,295 points
4. Marc – 1,291 points
5. Jay – 1,287 points
6. Marco – 1,265 points

=== Points Chart ===
Contestants	Ep 1	Ep 2	Ep 3	Ep 4	Ep 5	Ep 6	Ep 7	Ep 8	Ep 9	Ep 10	Ep 11	Ep 12	Ep 13	Ep 14	Ep 15	Ep 16	Ep 17	Ep 18	Ep 19	Ep 20
Shreya	0	80	85	75	80	100	30	75	50	85	85	40	85	45	80	40	80	85	95	1295
Marco	0	80	85	75	90	75	30	80	50	75	90	40	85	85	30	40	80	95	80	1265
Emmie	0	80	40	45	80	50	85	75	90	80	80	91	90	45	80	90	45	80	80	1306
Marc	0	80	40	45	80	75	30	80	80	40	50	91	85	85	85	95	90	80	80	1291
Rubye	0	80	90	45	80	50	80	82	50	75	50	90	85	90	30	80	85	85	80	1307
Jay	0	90	40	80	80	50	75	77	80	40	85	95	85	45	80	80	45	80	80	1287

- Fetcher Stayed in Studio for that episode
- Fetcher was the winner for the day

=== Final results ===
- Season 5 Champion: Marco
- 2nd Place: Emmie
- 3rd Place: Rubye
- 4th Place: Shreya
- 5th Place: Marc
- 6th Place: Jay
