= The Ruff Ruffman Show =

American live action/animated Children's educational web series

- Genre: Children's television series Educational
- Presented by: Ruff Ruffman
- Voices of: Jim Conroy
- Country of origin: United States
- Original language: English
- No. of episodes: 20

Production
- Running time: 7–8 minutes

Original release
- Network: PBSKids.org, YouTube
- Release: September 28 – October 21, 2017

The Ruff Ruffman Show is an American live action/animated children's educational web series produced by GBH Kids for PBS Kids. It is a follow-up to Fetch! with Ruff Ruffman (2006–2010), with this show focusing on topics of science, rather than the game show format of Fetch!.

== Synopsis ==
The show features Ruff Ruffman (with Jim Conroy reprising the voice role of Ruff) showing the viewers how to do certain science related hands-on activities and games. Also, the show features some videos of kids asking him questions about certain science experiments. It also teaches children certain science inquiry skills. The topics on the show that are featured include building things, materials, sports, and kitchen science. The show was primarily funded by the Corporation for Public Broadcasting and the U.S. Department of Education's Ready to Learn Program. The show also features Ruff's co-hosts Chet the Mouse and Blossom the Cat, who were also from Fetch!. It is an online show that premiered on September 28, 2017, and ran until October 20, 2017 on PBSKids.org and YouTube.

== Episodes ==
No.	Title	Original release date
1	"A Plushie for Grandma"	September 28, 2017
2	"Plushie on Ice"	September 29, 2017
3	"Pulling for the Plushie"	September 29, 2017
4	"Win a Plushie!"	September 29, 2017
5	"Music Video: I Won’t Give Up, Ruff Ruffman Action Plushie!"	September 29, 2017
6	"Make Sure It's a Hamster"	September 30, 2017
7	"Plarn it!"	October 1, 2017
8	"Turn Your Rhino into a Dog"	October 1, 2017
9	"A Dry Pet is a Happy Pet"	October 1, 2017
10	"Music Video: A Well-Dressed Rhinoceros"	October 2, 2017
11	"The Great Ruffet/Scruffet Cookoff"	October 3, 2017
12	"How to Un-toast Toast"	October 4, 2017
13	"Duck, Duck, Egg!"	October 4, 2017
14	"Ruff Mixes It Up"	October 4, 2017
15	"Music Video: Now We're Cookin'!"	October 4, 2017
16	"Building is a Breeze"	October 3, 2017
17	"Eye of the Hamster"	October 4, 2017
18	"Winging It"	October 4, 2017
19	"Ruffman Escapes"	October 4, 2017
20	"Music Video: That'll Work!"	October 4, 2017
