= Design Squad =

- Genre: Reality television
- Country of origin: United States
- Original language: English
- No. of seasons: 3
- No. of episodes: 36

Production
- Running time: 30 minutes
- Production company: WGBH

Original release
- Network: PBS Kids Go!
- Release: February 21, 2007 – December 9, 2009

Design Squad is an American reality competition television series targeted towards children ages 10–13. Contestants are high school students who design and build machines to compete for a $10,000 college scholarship from Intel, who is one of the show's corporate funders.

The series aired on PBS Kids and PBS Kids Go! from February 21, 2007, to December 9, 2009. It was produced by WGBH, a PBS member station in Boston.

== Premise ==
In each episode, contestants are separated into two color-coded teams to complete engineering projects for real-life clients. These are the Red Team and Blue Team in season 1 and the Green Team and Purple Team in seasons 2 and 3.

Engineers Nate Ball and Deanne Bell hosted season 1. After season 1, Bell departed for the Discovery Channel program Smash Lab, leaving Ball as the sole host of seasons 2 and 3.

== Season 1 (2007) ==
=== Contestants ===
1. Giselle Eng
2. Joey Nguyen
3. Kimberly "Kim" Zalatan
4. Krishana House
5. Michael Spieler
6. Natasha Sivananjaiah
7. Noah Tovares
8. Thomas "Tom" Cotter

=== Episodes ===
1. "The Need for Speed" – A professional racecar builder challenges the teams to convert kiddie toys into motorized dragsters.
2. "Rock On" – The teams compete to create original musical instruments-one stringed and one percussive-for Off White Noise, a local band. The instruments are put to the test when Off White Noise rocks out at the Middle East nightclub.
3. "Skunk'd" – When a guy named Skunk comes looking for a bike bizarre enough to impress the members of SCUL (Subversive Choppers Urban Legion), well, you give him what he wants. The rubber really hits the road when DS parades their newly created choppers (bikes) on a SCUL mission.
4. "DS Unplugged" – The teams take a crash course in pre-industrial building techniques, as they compete to build 20-foot bridges—without the aid of power tools, forklifts, or ... flushable toilets. It's a show for the (Middle) Ages!
5. "Got Game" – Challenged to come up with a way to cover all the angles of a basketball game via remote-controlled cameras, the teams dive into action and compete to prove who's got (the whole) game!
6. "A Collective Collaboration" – The teams set their sights on designing the most durable, portable and low cost peanut butter making machines for a women's collective in Haiti. Powered by human hands and inspiring to the human heart, DS shows that engineering really can change lives.
7. "Just For Kicks" – The challenge: design a REVOLUTIONary device that automatically feeds a stream of balls to Michael Parkhurst, a professional soccer player with the New England Revolution. Here's one Design Squad's episode that's sure to be a ball.
8. "Functional Fashion" – It's a marriage of high tech and haute couture (well, sort of!) as the teams compete to see who can design the best dual-purpose clothing. Join DS on the runway as the garments/gadgets make their fashion debut.
9. "Batter Up" – How to make a perfect pancake? The DS teams seek the right ingredients for a machine that will cook, flip, and serve up delicious flapjacks at the flick of a switch. The winning machine is put to the (taste) test at a busy diner.
10. "Pumped" – An 11-foot tall water slide will be a cool addition to the community pool—once there's a pump to deliver the water. See which invention makes the biggest splash with YMCA campers.
11. "Blowin' In The Wind" – The teams tap into their inner artists as they compete to design and build wind-powered kinetic art from recycled materials. The winning sculpture is put on display at the DeCordova Museum and Sculpture Park in Lincoln, Massachusetts.
12. "Bodies Electric" – Design Squad-ers take a shine to hip-hop artist Wyatt Jackson when they try to create a sound-and-light show triggered by Jackson's moves and grooves. In a live performance, it's DS night at the Strand Theatre!
13. "Winner Takes All" – The season concludes when Continuum (a design consultancy) asks the DS teams to develop and test a "summer sled" for retail giant L.L.Bean. It's a bumpy, downhill slide to the finish line!

=== Points ===
In most challenges, each person in the winning team would receive 100 points, the other team 0 points.

Name	Week 1	Week 2	Week 3	Week 4	Week 5	Week 6	Week 7	Week 8	Week 9	Week 10	Week 11	Weeks 12/13	Total
Noah	0	100, 100	100, 200	30, 230	100, 330	100, 430	100, 530	0, 530	100, 630	0, 630	100, 730	70, 800	800
Natasha	100	50, 150	100, 250	30, 280	100, 380	100, 480	100, 580	100, 680	100, 780	0, 780	0, 780	30, 810	810
Krishana	0	50, 50	100, 150	70, 220	0, 220	100, 320	0, 320	100, 420	0, 420	100, 520	100, 620	70, 690	690
Michael	100	50, 150	100, 250	70, 320	0, 320	100, 420	100, 520	0, 520	100, 620	100, 720	0, 720	30, 750	750
Kim	100	100, 200	100, 300	70, 370	0, 370	0, 370	100, 470	100, 570	0, 570	0, 570	100, 670	30, 700	700
Tom	0	50, 50	100, 150	70, 220	100, 320	0, 320	0, 320	0, 320	0, 320	100, 420	100, 520	70, 590	590
Joey	100	100, 200	100, 300	30, 330	100, 430	0, 430	0, 430	0, 430	0, 430	100, 530	0, 530	30, 560	560
Giselle	0	100, 100	100, 200	30, 230	0, 230	0, 230	0, 230	100, 330	100, 430	0, 430	0, 430	70, 500	500

- In Week 2, there were 3 band members that picked 3 out of 4 instruments. Each instrument picked was 50 points.
- In Week 3, the Judges thought both teams made excellent bikes and gave both teams 100 points.
- In Week 4, the Judges thought both teams worked very hard and didn't want winner take all. Because the Red Team needed extra help to finish they split the points 30(red)/70(blue).
- In Week 12, Wyatt Jackson (Judge) enjoyed Blue team's performance. However, he also enjoyed Red Team's Light Show, so they split the points 30(blue)/70(red).
- In most challenges, each person in the winning team would receive 100 points, the other team 0 points.

== Season 2 (2008) ==
=== Contestants ===
1. Dewey Hahn
2. Deysi Melgar
3. Jason George
4. Kim Gaughan
5. Leah French
6. Nicholas "Nick" Palumbo
7. Tomas Gulo
8. Tréjonda Moment

=== Episodes ===
1. "Cardboard Furniture" – Sit back and relax as the Design Squad teams create innovative, yet practical cardboard furniture for the home goods superstore IKEA. Furniture shoppers take a seat in the judges' chair to decide the season premiere's winning team.
2. "PVC Kayak" – Jump on board as King Island Alaskan native Sean Gallagher challenges the Design Squad teams to build ten-foot kayaks using traditional design but with non-traditional materials.
3. "Green Machines" – The teams go green as they work with the Food Project, an organization that creates social change through sustainable agriculture. Two young Food Project volunteers challenge the teams to design a compost lifter for their urban farm.
4. "Gravity Bikes" – Watch the Design Squad teams go head to head as they build high-speed gravity bikes for Gravity Sports International champion Tom Whalen.
5. "Water Dancing" – Dancer and performance artist Lisa Bufano, a bilateral leg and finger amputee, challenges the teams to build specialized prostheses for an underwater performance.
6. "Backyard Thrill Ride" – The teams bring the adrenaline rush of an amusement park ride to the backyard of 13-year-old Andreas Hoffman.
7. "Big Bugs" – The teams build wooden arthropods for an artist.
8. "Aquatic Robotics" – Dive deep as the teams build a robot that would float on a river-only for tourists and their guides-if they're sailing on a river.
9. "Band Cam" – Fly high with the Design Squad as they build a flying digital camera for a live concert of African band Zili Misik.
10. "No Crying in Baseball" – Come along as the Design Squad builds an onion-grinding machine for a guy who sells hot dogs.
11. "Hockey Net Targets" – Get a hockey puck as the teams build targets for hockey goals.
12. "Offroad Go-Karts 1" – It's part 1 of the season finale as the teams try to build offroad go-karts.
13. "Offroad Go-Karts 2" – It's Dewey versus Leah in a race for the college scholarship as the final episode of Season 2 makes the teams test their go-karts.

=== Points ===
In most challenges, each person in the winning team would receive 100 points, the other team 0 points.

Name	Week 1	Week 2	Week 3	Week 4	Week 5	Week 6	Week 7	Week 8	Week 9	Week 10	Week 11	Weeks 12/13	Total
Dewey	0	100, 100	0, 100	100, 200	100, 300	100, 400	100, 500	0, 500	100, 600	100, 700	0, 700	0, 700	700
Deysi	100	0, 100	100, 200	0, 200	100, 300	0, 300	0, 300	0, 300	0, 300	100, 400	100, 500	100, 600	600
Tomas	100	100, 200	100, 300	0, 300	0, 300	100, 400	100, 500	0, 500	0, 500	0, 500	100, 600	0, 600	600
Nick	100	0, 100	0, 100	0, 100	0, 100	100, 200	100, 300	0, 300	100, 400	0, 400	100, 500	0, 500	500
Leah	100	100, 200	100, 300	100, 400	0, 400	0, 400	0, 400	0, 400	100, 500	100, 600	100, 700	100, 800	800
Jason	0	0, 0	100, 100	100, 200	100, 300	100, 400	100, 500	0, 500	0, 500	0, 500	0, 500	100, 600	600
Kim	0	100, 100	0, 100	100, 200	100, 300	0, 300	0, 300	0, 300	0, 300	100, 400	100, 500	100, 600	600
Trejonda	0	0, 0	0, 0	0, 0	0, 0	0, 0	0, 0	0, 0	100, 100	0, 100	0, 100	0, 100	100

- In Week 8, neither team was able to complete the task, so no points were awarded.
- Trejonda had the dubious distinction of earning no points until Week 9. As she herself said in the intro to Week 4, "Right now, I feel like the jinx. You know, at first, I thought it was the Green Team title that was the reason I was losing, but now I feel like 'If Trejonda's on your team, you're going to lose.'"
- Leah won the season and a $10,000 scholarship from the Intel Foundation.

== Season 3 (2009) ==
=== Contestants ===
- Ana
- Annelise
- Juan
- Lindsey
- Wes
- Zach

=== Episodes ===
1. "Moving Target" – The Design Squad teams reach new heights by building indestructible, remote-controlled, flying football targets for Nerf toymaker Hasbro. Future football stars judge the designs for the kick-off episode of season three.
2. "Crash-Test Rugby" – U.S. Paralympic athlete and wheelchair rugby player Kerri Morgan asks the teams to track her every move on the court by building an automated wheelchair that simulates a defensive player on the attack.
3. "Water Rescue Part 1"
4. "Water Rescue Part 2" – The Design Squads build remote-controlled, aquatic pet rescue vehicles for the New Orleans Fire Department.
5. "Shooting for the Sun" – It comes down to the buzzer when WNBA players Lindsay Whalen and Tamika Raymond challenge the Design Squads to build T-shirt shooters that reach their arena's upper deck. The winning T-shirt shooter is announced live at a Connecticut Sun home game.
6. "sNOw Problem? Part 1"
7. "sNOw Problem? Part 2" – Come along for the ride as the Design Squads build dry land dog sleds for Jamaican Dog Sled team members Damion Robb and Newton Marshall.
8. "Tour de BBQ" – The competition heats up when Redbones BBQ Restaurant owner, Rob Gregory, challenges the teams to build a bicycle-powered rotisserie.
9. "Escape from Misery Island Part 1"
10. "Escape from Misery Island Part 2" – In the final showdown, the teams test their sea legs by building sailboats to race across the open ocean. The captain of the winning team is awarded a $10,000 college scholarship from the Intel Foundation.

== Design Squad Nation ==
Design Squad Nation is a 10-episode spin-off television and web series. The series aired on PBS Kids Go! from January 26 to March 30, 2011, and was also streamed on the PBS Kids Go! website. It was hosted by engineers Judy Lee and Adam Vollmer. The hosts travel around the world and work with children on engineering projects to "make their wishes come true through engineering" and "inspire viewers to take on their own hands-on engineering activities."

=== Episodes ===
1. "Apache Skateboarders" – On the premiere episode of Design Squad Nation, Ronnie—a 17-year-old skateboarder from the White Mountain Apache Reservation in Whiteriver, Arizona—teams up with co-hosts Judy and Adam to build a skateboarding street course. Engineered to be modular, durable, and weather-resistant, this is the skate park of Ronnie's dreams.
2. "It's Alive!!!" – Judy and Adam join forces with Jennifer—a young pastry chef from Boston, MA—to create the cake of her dreams for the cast party of "Young Frankenstein: The Musical." With guidance and inspiration from master baker Jorg Amsler of Truly Jorg's Patisserie in Saugus, MA, the team engineers a cake that is part delicious, part electronic, and part mad scientist—wowing the musical's cast and crew.
3. "Garden–to–Go" – Judy and Adam travel to London, England to meet Mariam and Bert, two young members of Global Generation—a community organization that grows fruits and vegetables in one of London's largest construction sites. Bringing new meaning to the phrase "eat locally, build globally," Mariam and Bert work with Adam and Judy to design and build a pedal-powered mobile garden that will help them sell their produce to nearby restaurants.
4. "A Cut Above Part 1"
5. "A Cut Above Part 2" – Judy and Adam travel to New York City, the fashion capital of the United States, to meet up-and-coming designers Eduarda and Juan. Eduarda and Juan's dreams come true when fashion designer Christian Siriano challenges them to showcase their individuality and creativity by drawing upon Judy and Adam's engineering know-how to re-interpret a gown from his collection. Their red carpet-worthy designs are treated to a surprise critique when two editors from Teen Vogue magazine join Christian at a fashion shoot.
6. "Musical Bike" – Judy and Adam meet Beatriz in her hometown of Emeryville, California to help her combine her passion for music and bike building. Working at The Crucible—a non-profit educational foundry and metal fabrication shop—they design and build a pedal-powered bike organ for Beatriz to unveil at her high school block party.
7. "DIY Playground" – Judy and Adam journey to the northern mountains of Nicaragua to work with the kids of Cusmapa to build the playground of their dreams. With the help of the Fabretto Children's Foundation, a non profit organization that helps local children reach their full potential, the entire community pitches in, working from the ground up to build Cusmapa a playground.
8. "One Giant Leap Part 1"
9. "One Giant Leap Part 2" – Judy and Adam invite Felipe—an accomplished 15-year-old pilot from Miami, Florida—to compete in the 2010 Red Bull Flugtag competition. Together, they team up with NASA to design and build a human-powered flying machine. With their NASA-inspired glider design, Team One Giant Leap soars off a 30-foot high deck, impressing the judges with distance and style.
10. "Trash to Treasure" – For the season finale, Design Squad Nation asked kids across the country to recycle, re-use, and re-engineer everyday materials into the next big invention in the 2010 Trash to Treasure contest. Three grand-prize winners visit Boston to work with professional engineers at Continuum, a global innovation and design consultancy, to see their original ideas become real products.

== Design Squad Global ==
PBS Kids launched the Design Squad Global website to complement the series. Targeted towards middle school students, the website enables children to share engineering ideas and sketches with each other, devise solutions to global design challenges, play games, and watch a web series hosted by Ball and Season 2 contestant Deysi Melgar. In an initiative known as "DSG Clubs," the website also encourages middle school students to form engineering clubs and partner with clubs from other countries via the website. This initiative aims to encourage children to "use the design process to solve problems and discover that engineering is a powerful tool for making a difference in the world" and teach them "'global competence'—the ability to communicate and collaborate with people from different backgrounds, cultures, and perspectives."

== Reception ==
Emily Ashby of Common Sense Media gave the series four out of five stars, stating that it "proves that if it's done right, reality TV can be both fun and functional." Ashby gave Design Squad Nation the same rating, stating: "From the obvious benefits of exposing kids to useful applications of science to strong messages about creative thinking, teamwork, and problem solving, there’s no end to the positive takeaways available here." Design Squad Global received a four-star rating for parents from Susan Yudt of Common Sense Media and a five-star rating for teachers from Marianne Rogowski of Common Sense Media.

The show is featured in the second episode of Fetch! with Ruff Ruffman's fourth season, where Blossom the Cat is a huge fan of Design Squad, and two of the season's contestants, Isaac Bean and Liza Giangrande met Nate Ball to learn how to pole vault.

== Awards ==
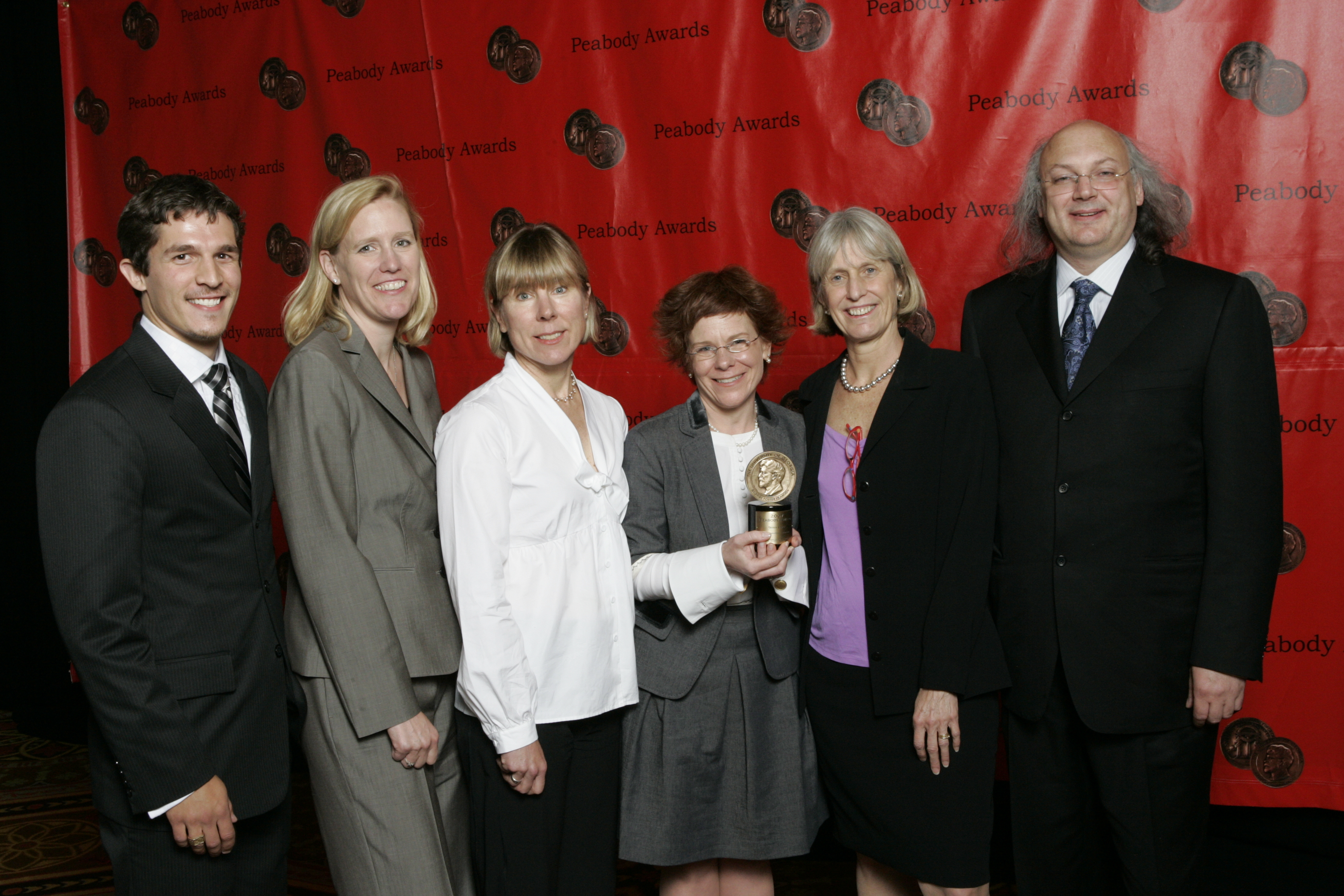
Nate Ball, Dorothy Dickie, Marisa Wolsky, Thea Sahr and David Wallace at the 67th Annual Peabody Awards for Design Squad

The series won a Peabody Award in 2007 "for 'designing' an outstanding program to interest young people in careers related to engineering." Producer/Director Dorothy Dickie won an Emmy Award for Outstanding Directing in a Children's Series in 2008. Design Squad Nation won an Emmy Award in 2012 for “outstanding new approaches” in children's daytime television.
