= Jamaica Dogsled Team =

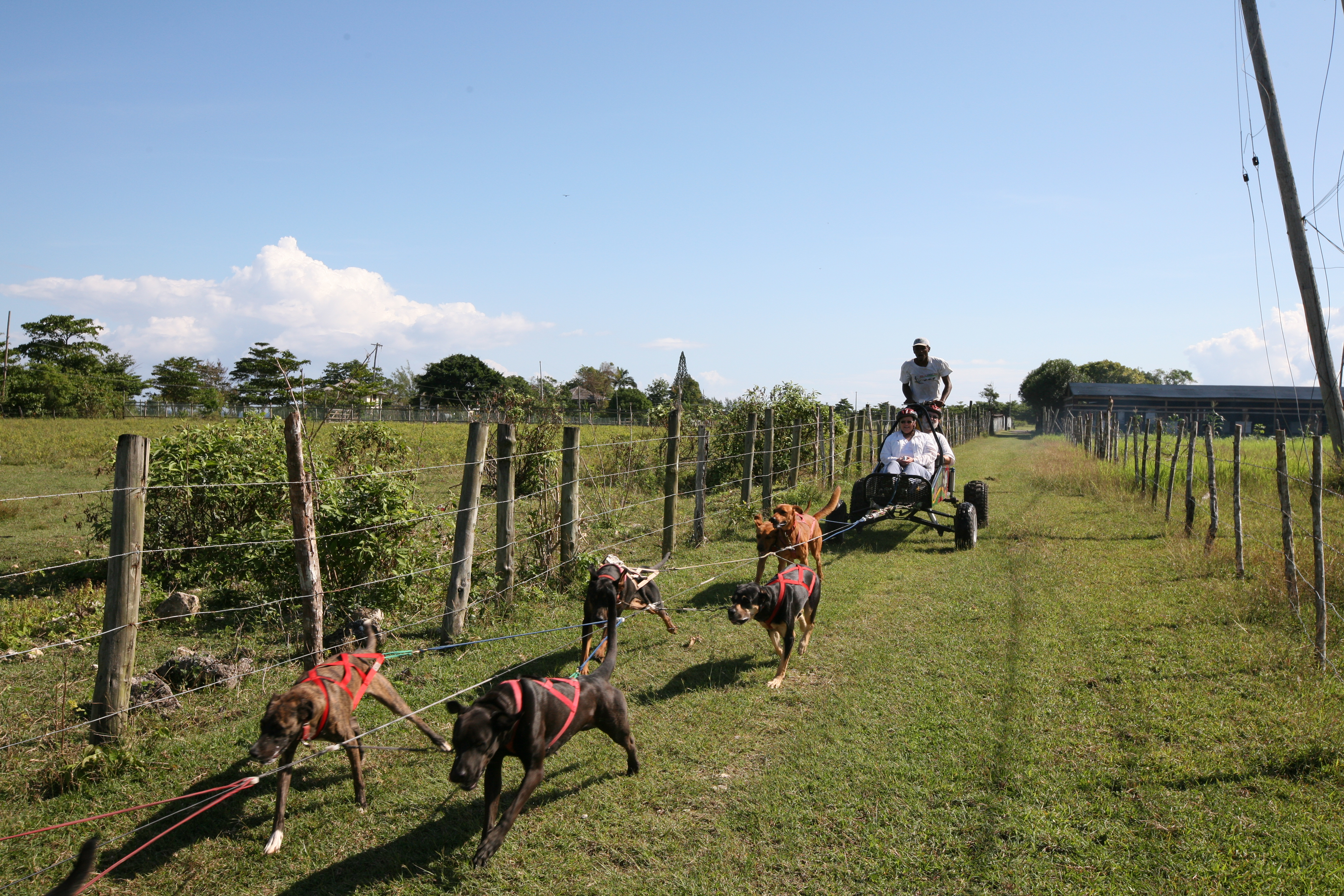
Damion Robb dryland dog sledding at Chukka Cove, St. Ann, Jamaica

The Jamaica Dogsled Team is a team of sled dogs and mushers (sled dog racers) headquartered at Chukka Caribbean Adventures in Ocho Rios, located in Saint Ann Parish, Jamaica. The dog team is made up of strays rescued by the Jamaica Society for the Prevention of Cruelty to Animals and offers dryland dogsled rides, along with the adventure center's other outdoor experiences. In addition, the two mushers Newton Marshall and Damion Robb, compete in sled races throughout the US and Canada, using leased dog teams. (Jamaican dogs taken out of the country are not allowed to return due to quarantine regulations.) Country music singer Jimmy Buffett's Margaritaville is the team's major sponsor.

== Beginnings ==
The Jamaica Dogsled Team was started in 2005 by Danny Melville, owner of Chukka Caribbean Adventures. Melville was shopping for dune buggies at Badland Buggies, a fabrication shop in Edmonton, Alberta, when he saw a dryland cart for training sled dogs. Fascinated, Melville contacted Alan Stewart, a Scottish sled dog trainer who was having the cart made. Following in the footsteps of the famous Jamaica national bobsled team, Melville decided to form Jamaica's first dogsled team.

In July 2005, Melville sent Chukka Cove manager Devon Anderson—known as a "horse whisperer" for his gentle way with animals—to Scotland to train in dryland racing under Stewart, owner of Cairngorm Adventure Centre.

In August, Stewart came to Jamaica, where he helped Melville and Anderson develop a dog team, starting with nine dogs rescued from a welfare home. Rick Johnson of Mahtowa, Minnesota, also spent two weeks in Jamaica. When Stewart left in September, a kennel had been built, complete with dog houses and a chain-link enclosure, and the dogs were running in harness. The following November, Danny and Carole Melville attended the North Star Sled Dog Club's Fall 2005 Fun for All Seminar in Minnesota.

== Racing ==
On 21–22 January 2006, Anderson returned to Scotland, where he competed in the Aviemore Sled Dog Rally, a four-dog dryland race. He finished 27th out of 40 competitors, with a time of 45 minutes and 51 seconds.

In the fall of 2006, Anderson finished in two Pro 4 Dog Rig Class dryland sled dog races in Minnesota. He finished 2nd out of 11 in the Byllesby Dryland Classic and 8th out of 18 in the East Meets West Dryland Challenge. For both races he used a team provided by Ken & Donna Davis out of Elfstone Kennels in Twig, MN.

On 12 April 2007, the full-length documentary Sun Dogs premiered at the ReelWorld Film Festival in Toronto. The film, produced by Palm Pictures, documented the beginnings of the Jamaica Dogsled Team and, along with a growing number of tv appearances and radio broadcasts, catapulted the team into the public's eye.

In the fall of 2007 Damion Robb and Newton Marshall joined the team. Robb finished in 2nd place in the Byllesby Dryland Classic on 20–21 October and finished 3rd in the Dirty Dog Dryland Derby on 27–28 October. On 17–18 November Robb took first place in the East Meets West Dryland Challenge, 4-Dog Pro Class. Marshall began training in long-distance racing with Austrian-born Hans Gatt, three-time champion of the Yukon Quest International Sled Dog Race.

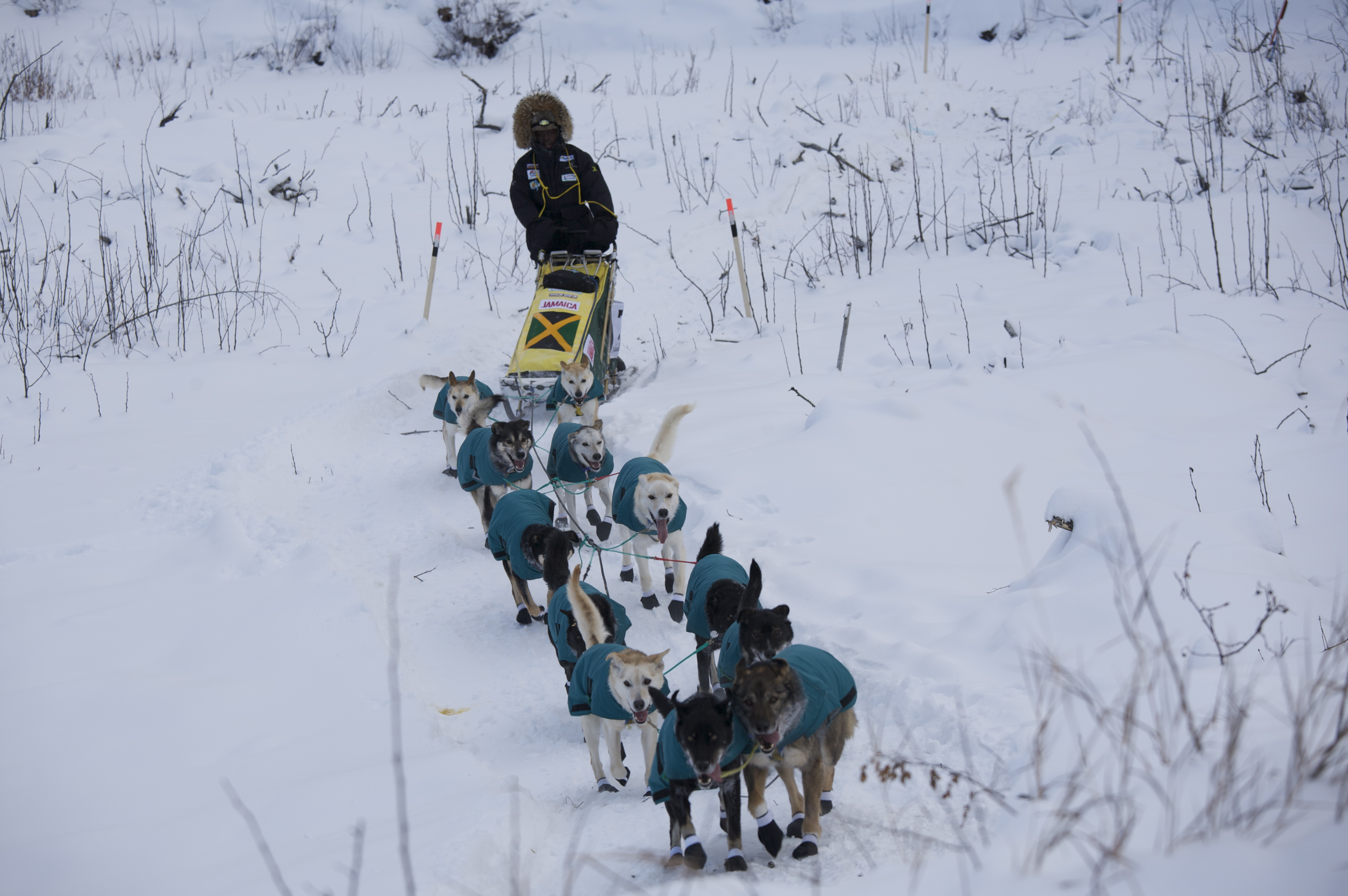
Newton Marshall competing in the 2009 Yukon Quest (Photo by Carole Melville)

== To the snow ==
In 2008 Robb and Marshall began racing on snow. Robb, who trained with Ken Davis, a competitive musher from Twig, Minnesota, focused on sprint racing. He placed 7th in his first sled dog race, the Kinross Classic Sled Dog Race in Kinross, Michigan, on 5–6 January. He went on to complete a total of nine sled dog races in the 2007–2008 season and eight in the 2008–2009 season.

On 27–28 March 2008, Marshall competed in his first major race, the Percy De Wolfe Memorial Mail Race from Dawson City, Yukon, to Eagle, Alaska, and back. He finished 7th place and won the coveted Sportsmanship Award. Marshall was described by Race Marshall Mel Besharah as "the coolest guy out there." During the 2008–2009 season Marshall returned to Canada to continue training with Hans Gatt. He finished 21st among 47 starters at the Sheep Mountain 150 and 13th in the Cooper Basin 300, a race that turned frigid, with temperatures reaching 50 below (Fahrenheit).

Completing two mid-distance races qualified Marshall for the 2009 Yukon Quest International Sled Dog Race, a 1000-mile race known for gruelling conditions. Marshall finished 13th place in the race, bringing 10 dogs to the finish line and earning $3000. He won the Challenge of the North Award for best exemplifying the spirit of the Yukon Quest.

In 2010, JDT musher Newton Marshall made international headlines when he became the first Caribbean musher ever to finish the famous Iditarod – the prestigious 1100-mile race from Willow to Nome, Alaska. He finished the race in 47th position out of a field of 71 mushers. His finishing time was 12 days, 4 hours, 27 minutes, 28 seconds. He trained for the race with four-time Iditarod champion Lance Mackey.

Meanwhile, also in 2010, Damion Robb, won a sprint race in Cannington, Ontario and had two-second and two third place finishes in his other four races.

== Affiliations ==
The Jamaica Dogsled Team is a member of the International Federation of Sleddog Sports, Inc., the Jamaica Society for the Prevention of Cruelty to Animals, and the International Sled Dog Racing Association, Inc.

== See also ==
- Jamaica national bobsled team
