= Newton Marshall =

Jamaican dog musher (born 1980)

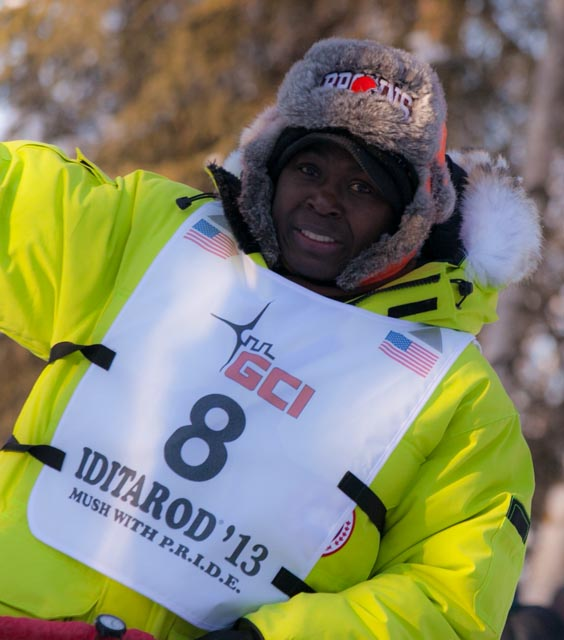
Newton Marshall at the ceremonial start of the 2013 Iditarod

Newton Marshall (born 2 March 1983 in St. Anne, Jamaica) is a professional independent dogsled musher.

== Biography ==
Marshall joined Chukka Caribbean Adventures in 2002. He had always dreamed about working with the horses at Chukka Cove, St. Ann. His enthusiasm and hard work paid off and having moved up from gardener to other positions he was transferred to the River Valley Mountain Horseback Ride at White River Valley as a tour guide.

With a need for better educated workforce Chukka Caribbean Adventures had become pro-active in trying to further schooling for employees who want to learn while working. Chukka neighbour Shelly Kennedy runs a school teaching any employee of Chukka to read and write, if they want to learn. Newton became one of her most eager pupils, having grown up in a nearby village he had to work to support his family instead of continuing his education.

=== Discovery ===
In 2005 Devon Anderson, another animal lover and operations manager at Chukka Cove, saw something special in Newton and handpicked him to look after a trio of new dogs at Chukka Cove Farm, renowned for its polo and now home to the Jamaica Dogsled Team. It was there he first met the future sled dogs including Marbles and Jimmy and his soon-to-be instructors Rick and Anette Johnson owners of Ah-Regah Kennel & Equipment in Mahtowa, Minnesota. "Rick started talking to me about dog sledding; I didn't know what it was all about at the time. I watched them walk and talk to the dogs and wondered what they were doing. Rick hitched the dogs to a three-wheel cycle and asked me to run ahead and call to them in a special way – I was surprised when they responded," says Marshall.

By 2006 the team was a reality; youthful exuberance and a way with animals propelled Marshall to train with huskies in Minnesota. About this Marshall had this to say: “I didn’t know what to expect. I was looking forward to working with experienced dogs and to seeing a lot of snow. I knew it would be cold but thought it would be like a rainy day in Jamaica. On the first day they pulled me on a snowmobile – my first time in the snow – it was freezing and very shocking and I thought I was going to fly; so amazing to see dogs move that fast.” He was amazed by the Great Lakes Aquarium, the Minnesota Zoo, Gooseberry Falls State Park as well as the Corps of Engineers Lake Superior Marine Museum where he saw Duluth’s famous Aerial Bridge in action.

Even with all of this opportunity on his return to Jamaica, Marshall found himself without a job or a place on the Team. His poignant story plays out in the feature documentary Sun Dogs (2006). Throughout 2007 he worked hard to earn back the trust of Anderson and Melville and was finally welcomed back to Chukka Caribbean Adventures and the Jamaica Dogsled Team to train and escort visitors on the company's two sled dog tours in September. As fate would have it in November, Anderson, who was to train for the 2009 Yukon Quest, had second thoughts about being away from Jamaica for so long to train and race in the Yukon and so it was decided that Newton would step in to train and qualify for the Yukon Quest.

Marshall left sunny Jamaica and arrived in a freezing Whitehorse, Yukon Territory, Canada on Friday 29 November 2007 to begin his long distance training with three-time Yukon Quest winner Hans Gatt at Gatt Kennels in Atlin, B.C. Frigid temperatures and 100-mile runs with the sled dog team were his new reality and Gatt's experience and diligence in Marshall's training would mean his – and his team's – survival in harsh conditions saying: “In addition to learning the skills required to mush a dogsled team over long distances, Newton will need basic dog-care and camping skills in order to survive and care for fourteen dogs for ten to fourteen days, outside in the sub-arctic in the dead of winter.”

=== Competition ===
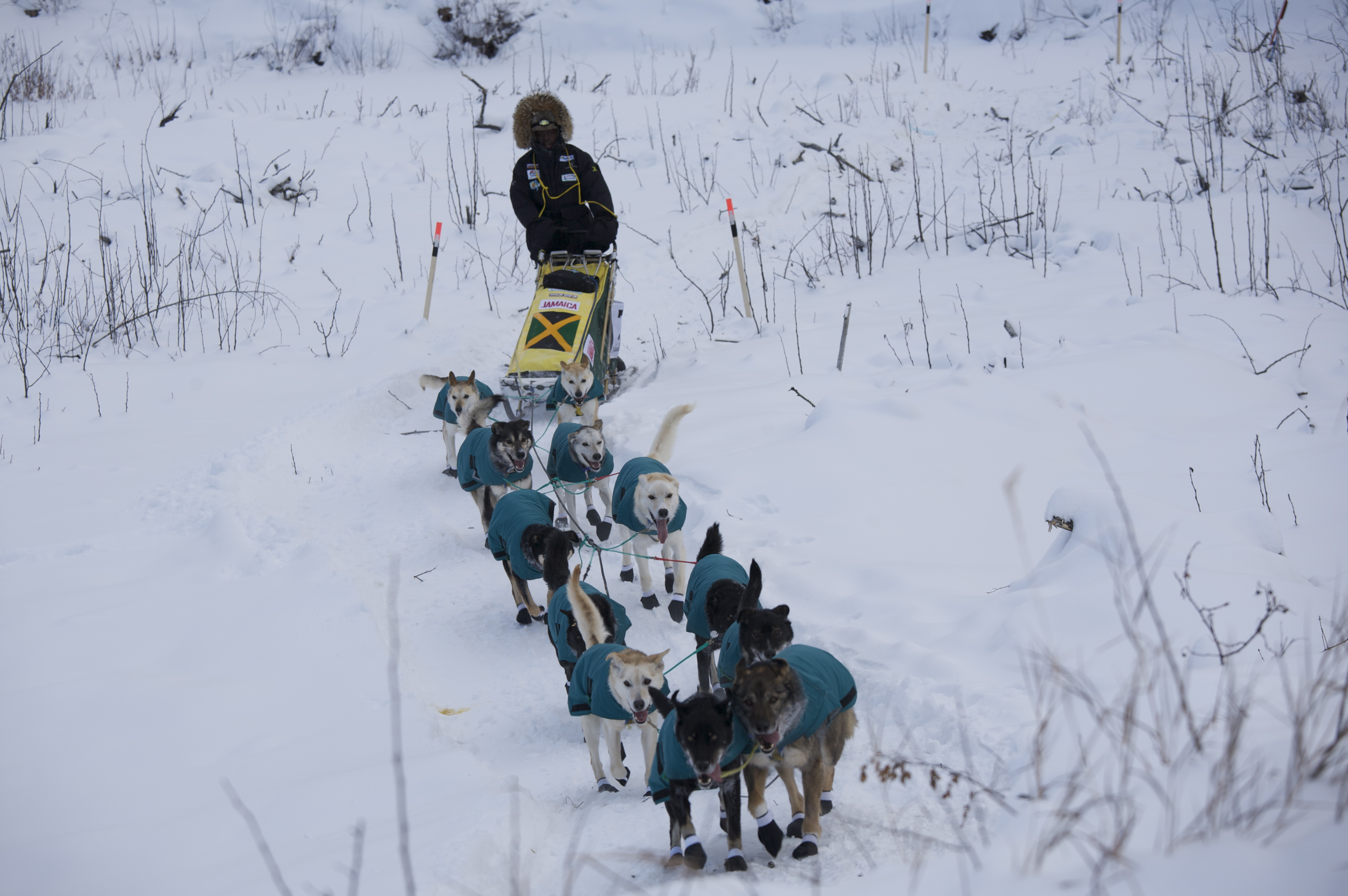
Newton Marshall in the Yukon Quest race

Marshall was up to the task and 27–28 March 2008 he competed in the 210-mile Percy DeWolfe Memorial Mail Race from Dawson City, Yukon Territory to Eagle, Alaska and back. He finished in 7th place out of a field of 15 with a time of 24hrs and 44mins and received the Sportsmanship Award from his fellow mushers.

Marshall successfully completed Alaska's Copper Basin 300 ( 10 to 13 Jan 2009) placing 13th in a field of 27 starts and became the first Jamaican ever to qualify to run in the Yukon Quest 1,000 Mile International Sled Dog Race. On 26 February 2009, he finished the Yukon Quest, placing 13th out of 29 racers. He brought 10 dogs to the finish line and earned $3,000. He also won the Challenge of the North Award. Race officials voted for the Jamaican musher because he best exemplified the "Spirit of the Quest," which compels mushers to challenge themselves and persevere. His bright smile and positive attitude have made him a fan favourite.

In 2010, JDT musher Newton Marshall made international headlines when he became the first Caribbean musher ever to finish the famous Iditarod – the prestigious 1100-mile race from Willow to Nome, Alaska. He finished the race in 47th position out of a field of 71 mushers. His finishing time was 12 days, 4 hours, 27 minutes, 28 seconds. He trained for the race with four-time Iditarod champion Lance Mackey.

=== 2010 Iditarod ===
Marshall was one of the rookie mushers in the 2010 Iditarod race. He was the first Jamaican to compete in the race. His team was financially supported by Jimmy Buffett's Margaritaville cafes and he was using borrowed sled dogs from Lance Mackey's Comeback Kennel. Marshall had been training with Mackey for this race. Newton came in 47th place in 12 days, 4 hours, 27 minutes, and 28 seconds.

=== 2011 Iditarod ===
Marshall returned to compete the next year. His bib number was 6. However, he withdrew from the race on 12 February at 1:01 pm. He had taken both his "layovers" and scratched at the checkpoint Anvik. He had 11 dogs when he scratched

=== 2013 Iditarod ===
After a 1-year absence Marshall returned to compete in the 2013 Iditarod independent of any major sponsorship, he ran a team of leased and borrowed dogs. He once again was forced to scratch when his now famous dog "Wrong Way May" got free from the team while Newton helped another competitor who was having trouble, May ran the trail backwards and was found 7 days later alive & well, near the race starting point nearly 300 miles from where she had gotten away.

=== 2014 Iditarod ===
Marshall returned to Alaska one more time, again without a Major Sponsor he funded his team with the help of a couple local businesses "Acme Auto Glass" & "Black Lake Buildings" of Wasilla, as well as donations through Crowd-funding and Social Media. With a small team of Volunteers and a borrowed mixed team of dogs from the kennels of Kathleen Fredricks & fellow competitor Wade Marrs. Newton Marshall finished the race in the 43rd position out of 69 mushers, on a trail that was called the toughest in the 42-year history of the race, and saw many veterans and past champions not make it to the finish line. He finished the race in 12 days 1 hour 5 min. 52 seconds with 13 dogs in harness and was presented with the "Herbie Nayokpuk Award" given to the musher who best mimics Nayokpuk with his/her attitude on the trail. Newton also made headlines during the race for coming to the aide of fellow musher Scott Janssen the "Mushing Mortician" who had broken his ankle on the trail and could not get back to his sled. Janssen laid in the icy overflow of the river until Marshall arrived.
