= Nathan Ball =

American engineer, entrepreneur, author, and athlete (born 1983)

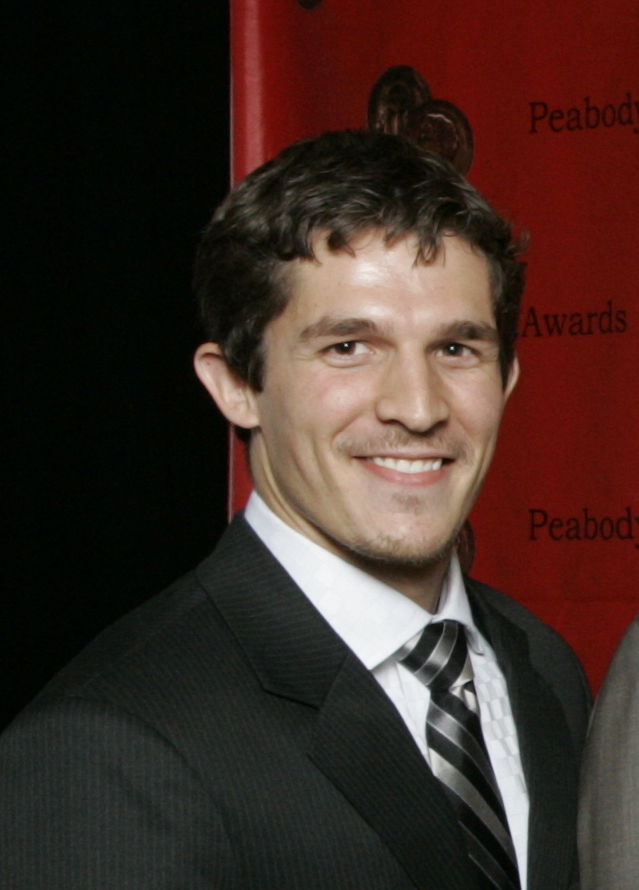
Nathan Ball at the 67th Annual Peabody Awards

Nathan "Nate" Ball (born May 13, 1983) is an American mechanical engineer, entrepreneur, TV host, children's author, pole vaulter, and beatboxer.

== Early life ==
He was born on May 13, 1983, and grew up in Newport, Oregon. He moved to Boston in 2001 to attend the Massachusetts Institute of Technology, where he studied mechanical engineering and earned two degrees: a Bachelor of Science (2005) and a Master of Science (2007). At MIT he was a two-time NCAA All-American pole-vaulter with a personal record of 16' 8 3/4".

== Media ==
Ball has served as a host on the PBS Kids show Design Squad since its first aired in 2007. Ball has also appeared in an episode of MythBusters, a History Channel special on Batman technology, an insurance advertisement, and in a Fetch! with Ruff Ruffman season 4 episode. Ball was featured in the Nova episode The Secret Life of Scientists and Engineers. He is the author of the Alien in my Pocket series of science-adventure chapter books for kids.

== Inventions ==
In 2005 he co-founded a business to develop the Atlas Powered Ascender, a tool he helped create that enables "reverse rappelling" up vertical surfaces at high speed. He was awarded the Lemelson-MIT Prize in 2007 for his work on the Atlas Powered Ascender, an improved needle-free jet injector system, and his work in engineering outreach with children. He is listed as the co-inventor on six patent applications, including for the Powered Rope Ascender.
