= Sun Dogs (2006 film) =

Canadian documentary film

- Directed by: Andrea Stewart
- Produced by: Jimmy Buffett; Andrea Stewart
- Cinematography: Paul Cuthbert
- Edited by: Michele Francis
- Production company: Palm Pictures
- Distributed by: Palm Pictures
- Release date: 2006
- Countries: Canada; United States
- Language: English

Sun Dogs is a 2006 documentary film directed by Andrea Stewart and distributed by Palm Pictures.

== Synopsis ==
Rescued from the mean streets and animal shelters of Kingston, 12 stray dogs are trained to be the stars of Jamaica’s first dogsled racing team. The crew, spearheaded by pop superstar Jimmy Buffett, brings the unlikely meeting of a traditionally snow-bound sport to the sand and surf.

The team's dog mushers are given the opportunity of a lifetime as they cultivate their love of animals while receiving an education and traveling the world. The film features interviews with the founder of the Jamaica Dogsled Team and footage of their training.
