= Fetch! with Ruff Ruffman =

American animated television series

- Genre: Children's game show Reality television
- Created by: Kate Taylor
- Developed by: WGBH Boston
- Written by: Glen Berger; Jim Conroy
- Directed by: Clifford Saito; Adam Dalley; Joe Truesdell; Peter Lyons; Wayne Simpson; Dean Raymond; Robert V. Lange; Chris Whitbeck
- Presented by: Jim Conroy
- Starring: Cast members
- Voices of: Jim Conroy
- Narrated by: Jim Conroy
- Theme music composer: Terry Tompkins; Rocco Gagliese; Steve D'Angelo
- Countries of origin: United States; United Kingdom; Canada
- Original language: English
- No. of seasons: 5
- No. of episodes: 100 (list of episodes)

Production
- Executive producer: Kate Taylor
- Producers: Paul Serafini; Marcy Gunther; Eric Handler; Alan Catello Grazioso
- Production locations: Boston, Massachusetts, and other parts of the USA
- Editors: Jessica Rueter Andrews; Lisa Wolf; Kathryn Farrelly; Jennifer Lorenz; Joe Headrick; Arnie Harchik; John Warren; Mark Geffen; Maureen Barillaro; Karen Silverstein; Cherry Enoki; James Rutenback
- Camera setup: Mark C. Helton; Dan Lang; Stephen McCarthy; Ken Willinger; Multi-camera (For Studio Segments)
- Running time: 26 minutes
- Production company: WGBH Boston

Original release
- Network: PBS Kids Go!
- Release: May 29, 2006 – November 4, 2010

Related
- The Ruff Ruffman Show

Fetch! with Ruff Ruffman (sometimes shortened as Fetch!) is an American live-action/animated television series that aired on PBS Kids Go! and is largely targeted toward children ages 6–10. It is a reality competition hosted by Ruff Ruffman, an animated anthropomorphic dog who dispenses challenges to the show's real-life contestants. The series aired from May 29, 2006, to November 4, 2010, on PBS across five seasons and 100 episodes, and featured 30 contestants. Although a sixth season was planned, with auditions taking place in January 2010, WGBH announced on June 14, 2010, that the series would end due to lack of funding. In June 2008, the series received its first Emmy for Best Original Song for its theme.

== Premise ==
Fetch! is a reality-based game show where young contestants (ages 10–14) face various challenges to gain points. During these challenges, they must complete various tasks assigned to them ahead of time and on the fly by Ruff and surrogates, depending on the situation. There is also an educational component, as contestants often must learn something, such as astronomy, puzzles, carpentry, engineering, food science, biology, chemistry, physics, and mathematics, to complete the task. Unlike most reality competition shows, there were no eliminations except for the season finale, and the standings for the show were determined by a points system that awarded points based on challenge performance in each episode. In the season finale, a final points tally was tabulated and a series of elimination challenges in the studio occurred to determine the winner for the season.

Not all contestants leave the studio each episode to complete tasks. According to Ruff, "As determined by the Fetch 3000", the contestants in the studio participate in the "Half-Time Quiz Show", in which he asks them up to ten questions, with limited time based on the activities of the contestants out on challenges. While participating in challenges, contestants will have the potential to earn up to 100 points. The contestants in the studio can earn a maximum of 50 points in the "Half-Time Quiz Show". The show has a Fetch Fairness Guarantee; that every contestant will "compete for the same number of points" across thirteen challenges and six "Half-time Quiz Shows" before the final episode. Additionally, Ruff assigns "Bone-us" points, usually 5 or 10, but sometimes 15 or 20, to stand-out contestants. On rare occasions, there is the possibility to earn more than 100 points outside of bonuses. The record for most points earned in one episode was 125, by Brian, Noah, and Khalil in episode 5, season 1, "Ye Olde Colonial Episode". In Season 4, contestants can have 1/2 points, such as 515 1/2 points. At the end of the season, the final points tally is tabulated and a series of elimination challenges occur in the studio to determine the winner of the season. The winner won the "Grand Prize" (which varied in each season) and got a poster on the Fetch Wall of Fame.

Prizes are not always desirable, and sometimes the prize holder winds up with a "booby prize"; for example, in "Good Dancing and Bad Breath", Anna and Brian had to dance a waltz in the studio. During the first season, the contestant had the choice of either keeping the prize or giving it to a fellow contestant. During the remaining four seasons, there are two unknown prizes which the winner chooses between. The chosen prize may be "mailed" to the mailbox in Studio G, although occasionally large prizes are hidden elsewhere on the set. In season 2, episode 7, "I'm OK, You're Okra", Rosario gave his prize to Nina. In season 4, episode 15, "Ruff Needs His Herring Checked", Sterling returned his prize to the mailbox.

=== Cultural references and guest stars ===
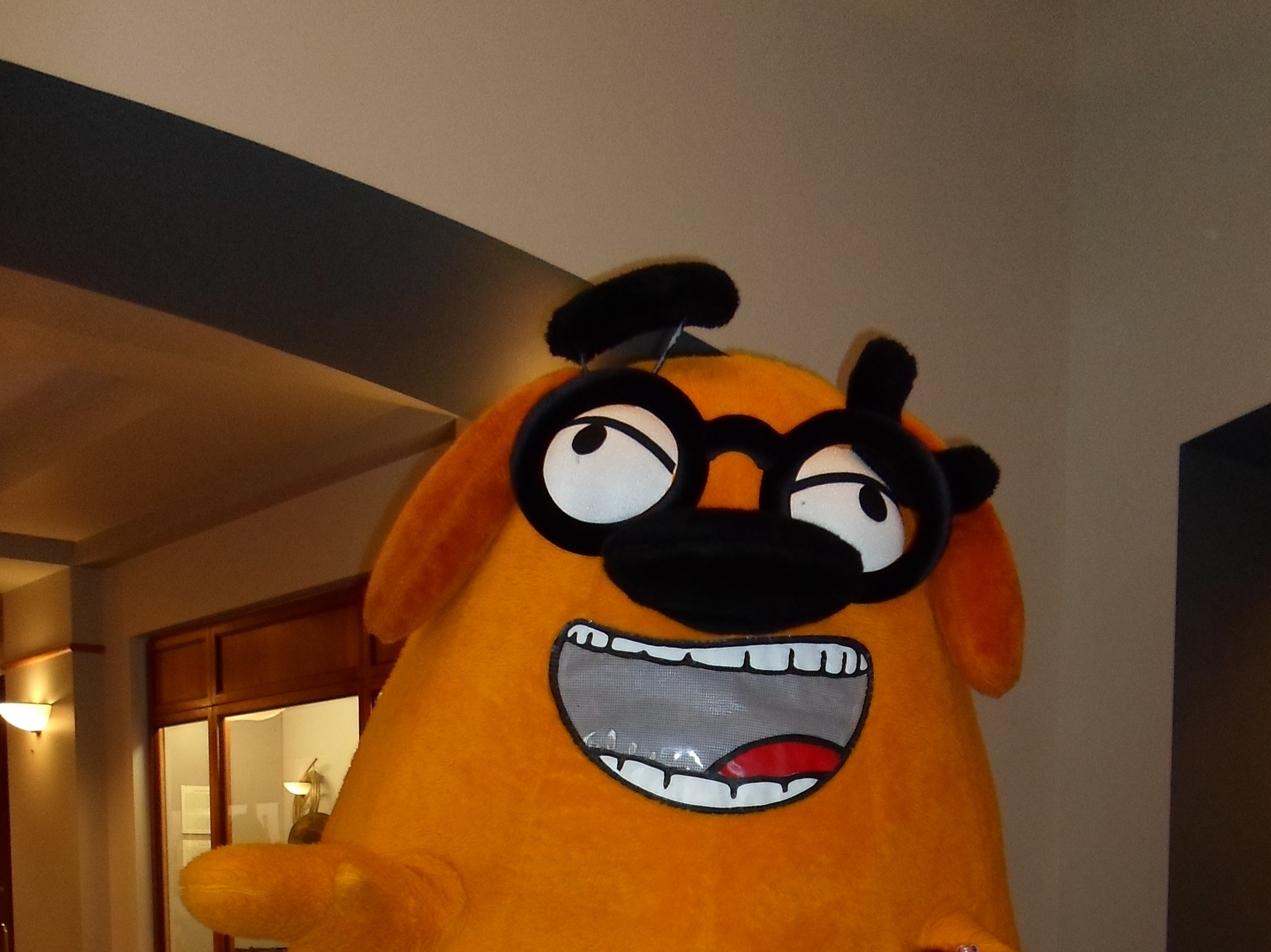
Ruff Ruffman 99.5 WCRB Classical Radio Boston 14th Annual Classical Cartoon Festival at Boston's Symphony Hall Fall 2012

Fetch! with Ruff Ruffman contains many cultural references, which make up most of its comedic style. In the season 2 premiere, when Nina does a sloppy job at making chocolate candy, Ruff remarks that it is "Jackson Pollock candy." In the following episode, he mentions that he likes REO Speedwagon. In season 2, episode 4, when Rosario voiced Ruff for the first time, Ruff remarked: "Is that Ruff Ruffman or Marge Simpson?" In season 2, episode 15, when the scuba instructors arrived at the beach, Ruff claimed that they were "faster than Batman" and that he "hoped Batman was watching the show". In season 3, episode 13, when Sam and Harsha throw sacks in a pail, Ruff states, "I feel like Shaq in the free throw line", referencing Shaquille O' Neal.

In season 4, episode 14, when Talia finds a horseshoe crab while working on a shrimp boat, Ruff states that it "Looks like Darth Vader's face with a billion legs coming out of it!" In season 4, episode 16, when Ruff calls Isaac, who is dressed as an old lady, he accidentally calls him Mrs. Doubtfire before correcting himself and calling him Mrs. Issacson. In season 4, episode 17, Talia gets to hold Roger Federer's tennis racket. In season 5, episode 14, when Rubye and Marc learn skydiving signs, Ruff remarked that one of the signs resembled "one of Beyoncé's dance moves." In season 5, episode 18, when Joe explains to the FETCHers and Michelle about the book she read, Michelle states: "I believe that was Green Eggs and Ham."

The show also had several guest stars. In season 1, episode 6, Aaron Carter and the contestants appear in his new music video. In season 1, episode 10, Anna and Noah earn quick cash by building a lemonade stand with the help of Norm Abram. In season 2, episode 2, Ruff sends Madi and Willie to meet the Blue Man Group. In season 2, episode 4, Bridget and Rosario met puppeteer John Kennedy posing as Bernie the Pig. In season 3, episode 4, Sam meets Senator Ted Kennedy. In season 4, episode 2, the host of Design Squad Nathan Ball, appeared in a pole vault challenge. In season 4, episode 17, Gary Sohmers, an appraiser for 13 seasons of Antiques Roadshow, appears to challenge two of the contestants to explore the Brimfield Antique Show in Brimfield, Massachusetts. In season 5, episode 3, Rubye meets magicians Penn & Teller in Las Vegas. In season 5, episode 4, Crush the sea turtle from the movie Finding Nemo appears via Ruff's Fetch 3000, with Andrew Stanton reprising his role.

== Episodes ==
Season	Episodes	Originally released		Winner
Season	Episodes	First released	Last released	Winner
1	20	May 29, 2006	June 29, 2006	Anna Sheridan
2	20	May 28, 2007	June 28, 2007	Michael "Mike" Spence
3	20	September 29, 2008	October 30, 2008	Jay Brosnan
4	20	September 11, 2009	October 15, 2009	Liza Giangrande
5	20	October 4, 2010	November 4, 2010	Marc "Marco" Frongillo

== Cast members ==
FETCH!	Cast member 1	Cast member 2	Cast member 3	Cast member 4	Cast member 5	Cast member 6
Season 1 (2006)	Noah Ellis	Khalil Flemming	Taylor Garron	Brian McGoff	Julia Millstein	Anna Sheridan
Season 2 (2007)	Madison "Madi" Bader	William "Willie" Bornkessel	Rosario Corso	Bridget O'Sullivan	Michael "Mike" Spence	Nina Wadekar
Season 3 (2008)	Harsha Amaravadi	Samuel "Sam" Blumenfeld	Samantha "Sammy" Boucher	Jay Brosnan	Demetrius Joseph "DJ" Thomas	Noel Um
Season 4 (2009)	Isaac Bean	Brian Conry	Liza Giangrande	Bethany Owens	Talia Patapoutian	Sterling Singletary †
Season 5 (2010)	Emeline "Emmie" Atwood	Marc "Marco" Frongillo	Rubye Peyser	Marc Prophet	Jay Ricco	Shreya Viswanathan

== Characters ==
=== Main ===
- Ruff Ruffman (voiced by Jim Conroy) is the host and main character of the show. He does not like cats and thinks dogs are superior to them, but his boss, Blossom, is an exception to this.
- Blossom, whose full name is Princess Blossom Pepperdoodle Von Yum Yum, is a mute black cat. At the beginning of Season 2, she is Ruff's intern, but is later promoted to being his supervisor in Season 3. Ruff did not enjoy Blossom's company at first, but forms a close bond with her in later seasons.
- Chet, a brown mouse who is Ruff's intern. He first appears in Season 3's second episode "When Home is a House of Cards", where he replaces Blossom when she is promoted to supervisor. He is also mute and does not seem to have any eyes or limbs. He is capable of doing feats that would normally be considered impossible, such as completing an obstacle course in seconds and building a jet engine that runs on expired liver and pineapple biscuit shakes.
- Henry is Ruff's boss, who is never seen but occasionally calls Ruff on the "Henry Hotline". Henry provides Ruff with the show's budget and oversees his spending.
- Murray is one of Ruff's cousins, who runs the behind-the-scenes technical work and is constantly blamed for minor problems on the show. Unlike other animated animals, Murray is portrayed by a real Basset Hound and sometimes appears in challenges. He stopped appearing at the start of Season 4.
- Tank is a bulldog who replaces Murray in Season Four, and wears a FETCH! shirt and earmuffs. Despite initially not seeming to be one, Tank has proven to be a reliable worker.

=== Supporting ===
- Grandma Ruffman (voiced by Jim Conroy) is Ruff and Scruff's grandmother, who speaks with a Long Island accent. She loves Ruff, but can be very critical at times. Like her son and daughter-in-law, Wink and Dinah Ruffman, she was a game show host/spy in her youth.
- Scruff Ruffman (voiced by Jim Conroy) is Ruff's identical evil twin brother, who is distinguished from him by a five-o'clock shadow. Throughout the show's run, Scruff becomes less evil and seeks to redeem himself and his family name. This likely stems from his girlfriend Petunia Fidolopolus framing Grandma Ruffman for trying to break Scruff out of prison. In season 5, he is paroled and is currently living under Grandma Ruffman's custody.
- Ruffael Ruffmanowitz (voiced by Jim Conroy) is Ruff's great-great-great-great-great-great grandfather, who was an inventor.
- Great Uncle McRuffmantosh (voiced by Jim Conroy) is Ruff's great-uncle who has a beard and has an exaggerated Scottish accent. He is a scholar with a Ph.D., and usually appears on the show for historical challenges.
- Spot Spotnik is Ruff's rival, who is tan with brown spots. Ruff sometimes sees him as his old friend, but he is shown to be devious and will do anything to come out on top. He tricks Ruff into thinking that Fetch! is canceled so he can be Charlene's date to a dance, and is responsible for traumatizing Ruff by ruining a ballet he starred in.
- Charlene is the poodle next door and love interest of both Ruff and Spot, who do not reciprocate their feelings.
- Helga von Ruffman (voiced by Jim Conroy) is Ruff's cousin, a fashion designer from Germany.
- Rüf Rüfmän (voiced by Jim Conroy) is Ruff's cousin, a rock star from Sweden.
- Glen Ruffman (voiced by Jim Conroy) is Ruff and Scruff's nephew. He wears dental braces and is obsessed with magic and fantasy. He is also Ruff's resident technical genius, and usually fixes the Fetch 3000 in exchange for the Fetchers completing his challenges.
- Gerry Geranium (voiced by Jim Conroy) is Grandma Ruffman's pet parrot, who Ruff sometimes looks after. In seasons 4 and 5, he explains to Ruff that his parents are alive and aids him in finding them.
- Blackmuzzle Ruffman (voiced by Jim Conroy) is the most feared canine pirate of the seven seas. He appears at the end of "Arrgh – All Me Eggs Are Cracked!" for pledging the show with his own loot. He also appears in "Season Four is Canceled" to attack Ruff's doghouse boat because he was bored and Ruff refused to give him Gerry to replace a frog on his shoulder. He tells Ruff that he recently acquired the internet so he does not have to shout from his ship; in response, Ruff told him to visit his website, allowing Ruff, Blossom, and Chet to lose him. Later on, he tells Ruff in a voicemail to be an oceanographer and helps him navigate the sea.
- Bluff Ruffman (voiced by Jim Conroy) is Ruff's wealthy cousin, who is an expert at Go Fish and often asks him for favors, such as looking after wild animals. He is also a conman, as he once tricked Ruff into promoting his beef jerky by claiming he had an Egyptian curse.
- Roxy Ruffman is Ruff's sister. She is mentioned in "Feeling Sheepish Ruff?", in which Ruff looks after her sheep. It is implied that she is Glen's mother.
- Harriet Hackensack (voiced by Jim Conroy) is the Australian owner of Ruff's network company, which has recently bought at the start of Season 4. She dislikes Murray for stealing her valuable sled Rosebud.
- Wink and Dinah Ruffman (both voiced by Jim Conroy) are Ruff's "long-lost" parents, who give the FETCHers instructions on how to get off Game Show Island. The series finale reveals they are spies.
- Tom and Trixie (both voiced by Jim Conroy) are Ruff's rivals and the hosts of Go Get It!, a ripoff of FETCH!. They are actually Ruff's parents, who were working undercover.

== Production ==
Fetch! (an acronym for "Fabulously Entertaining TV with a Canine Host") was produced at WGBH Studios in Boston. Seasons were filmed about a year before they aired. Season 4 was the first season to be filmed in High Definition (HD) in 2009.

The challenges were filmed mostly in Boston (as well as other areas in the US state of Massachusetts) and various other parts of the USA, depending on the challenges, during summertime when the children are out of school. The challenges, which were out on the field, are cut documentary-style, very similar to network reality TV shows.

After the FETCHers finished filming the challenges, contestants acted in-studio, with the voice of Ruff. Jim Conroy traveled to Boston from New York for the two weeks they spent shooting in the studio. The fourth camera simply captured Conroy doing his lines as Ruff in the audio booth. The kids heard him in the studio and he heard their reactions in his headphones. Ruff's lines were the only lines that were scripted out, though he would sometimes ad-lib an answer to a question or comment from a FETCHer. Once the lines were recorded, the show went into editing, where the challenges were sorted into the show order.

Then they were sent to Jim Conroy in New York City, to voice the dialog for Ruff's animation. Once that was complete, it was sent back to WGBH where editors placed audio clips of the animated characters. Once all of this was done, the episode was sent to Global Mechanic to animate the show. One out of the four editors had an off-set four-week system in place where one of them was ready to send a cut of a new episode to Vancouver, British Columbia, Canada every Friday. It took about six months to complete one season of the show.

Due to a lack of funding, WGBH announced that Fetch! would be canceled at the end of its fifth season even though casting had been completed for a sixth.

=== Studio G set ===
Studio G is the studio for Fetch! with Ruff Ruffman. Three segments of the show take place in the studio – the intro, half-time quiz show, and "Triumph Tally". In season 1, the contestants recognized that Studio G looked like a garage and asked Ruff why. This really annoyed Ruff, who told them it was not a garage but "Studio G". Throughout the show's five seasons, the studio changed. For seasons 1 and 2, the studio remained relatively unaltered, but sizable changes were made to the studio for season 3. The television through which the contestants communicate with Ruff was changed to a more current flat-screen TV, and Ruff's owner parked her car, a dusty Volkswagen Karmann Ghia, in the studio. A flamingo and trees as well as a "Studio G" sign and a "wall of fame" displaying past Fetch! contestant season winners were added to the studio in season 2. In season 4, a new remote control mailbox was placed on the TV Screen, which popped out when a challenge was in the mailbox. Season 5's major renovation occurred during the season finale – it became the Go Get It! studio (Studio P), and was a remodeled version of the Studio G set with new carpeting and pink chairs.

=== Auditions ===
To audition for the program, potential contestants were required to be between the ages of 10 and 14 by the first day of shooting, and be able to live in the greater Boston area over the summer, during school vacations, and a few weekends during the school year. FETCHers needed to be filmed without missing school. Auditions were handled by Maura Tighe Casting.

=== Cancellation ===
The show had auditions for its sixth season in January 2010, but on June 14, 2010, due to lack of funding, WGBH Boston announced that Season 5 will be the final season. On June 27, 2010, Jim Conroy (the voice of Ruff) made the official announcement at the Daytime Emmy Awards ceremony. On his Facebook page, he said, "It's such an impossible task going up against Sesame Street, Cyberchase, and The Electric Company. So you have to consider the nomination as a win. Can't complain. PBS gave us 100 episodes and 5 seasons. Many good shows never saw that kind of time." Fetch! aired its fifth and final season in October 2010, with the final episode date being November 4, 2010. After the series ended, reruns aired on selected PBS stations until August 31, 2014. A few years later, the PBS Kids channel launched, and reruns returned to broadcast on January 16, 2017 through November 20, 2018.

== Spinoffs ==
=== Ruff Ruffman: Humble Media Genius ===
In May 2014, a new spin-off was announced, called Ruff Ruffman: Humble Media Genius. This spin-off debuted in Fall 2014 and features short animations of Ruff Ruffman and Blossom, focusing on internet safety.

Episodes:

1. "Texting and You!" (November 2014)
2. "Photos and You!" (November 2014)
3. "Searching and You!" (November 2014)
4. "Technology and You!" (November 2014)
5. "Technology and You! Bonus Video: Chicken Island" (January 2015)
6. "Hang Up and Drive!" (July 2015)
7. "Hang Up and Drive! Bonus Video: Just Drive!" (July 2015)
8. "Privacy and You!" (January 2016)
9. "Privacy and You!: Deleted Scene" (January 2016)
10. "The Internet and Chet" (March 2016)
11. "Say! Cheese?" (May 2016)
12. "Getting the Most From the Internet" (June 2016)
13. "An Orange Dog Goes Green" (January 2017)

A new season of Ruff Ruffman: Humble Media Genius centered on the utility of artificial intelligence was released by PBS Kids on March 1, 2024. In this season of shorts, Ruff has a new cat assistant named Lupine.

Episodes:

1. "Ruff Amuck"
2. "Robot Helper"
3. "Algorithms"
4. "Poetry"
5. "Meet Halley"
6. "Spooky Movie Night"
7. "Too Good to Be True"
8. "Ruff's First Livestream"

=== The Ruff Ruffman Show ===
On July 30, 2017, PBS Kids and WGBH announced that Ruff Ruffman along with his two assistants Blossom and Chet will be making a comeback in a new digital series called The Ruff Ruffman Show, where they answer questions from real kids, take on challenges and learns the value of perseverance—all while modeling science inquiry skills. The digital series premiered on September 28, 2017.

=== Team Hamster! ===
On December 15, 2020, a web series called Team Hamster! premiered. It is a spin-off focusing on Ruff Ruffman's hamsters - Sadie, Mateo, and Tasha. The series also ties-in with games on the PBS KIDS website. In the series, Ruff is the janitor at the school the hamsters live in.

=== Cancelled spinoff: Spyhounds ===
WGBH and Global Mechanic had announced plans to produce a spin-off of Fetch! based on the online game Spyhounds. It would feature Ruff, Blossom, and Chet having a new career as super-spies, and Ruff is in way over his head. Luckily, he has much help: five clever kids, a purple poodle named Trixie, and millions of kids online. The spinoff plans were announced but were later canceled.

== Reception ==
=== Critical response ===
The show was an instant hit with audiences and received critical acclaim. The New York Times praised the series, writing "The show's creators have written in all the sarcasm and amazingness of a more sophisticated and harder-edged show, but not in a way that condones such behavior. There's a kind of genius to the setup." Larisa Wiseman of Common Sense Media gave the series four out of five stars, saying this entertaining PBS series combines the comedy of a cartoon, the challenge of a game show, and the best of reality TV.

=== Awards and accolades ===
Fetch! has received numerous awards over the years.

- APEX 2009: Grand Award for The Ruff Guide to Science
- U.S. International Film and Video Festival 2009: "Certificate for Creative Excellence" in the Children's Programming category
- 2009 Daytime Emmy Nominations: Outstanding Children's Series, Outstanding Writing in a Children's Series, Outstanding Achievement in Main Title and Graphic Design
- iParenting Media Award 2009: Winner – Television "2009 Best Products"
- Parents' Choice Awards 2009: Silver Honor Winner: TV show
- WorldFest Houston 2009: Gold Remi Award "TV Series – Family/Children"
- WorldFest Houston 2009: Platinum Remi Award "TV Series – Family/Children"
- MITX Award 2008: Winner – Best Kids, 'Tweens and Teens site
- 2008 Daytime Emmy Award: Outstanding Original Song – Children's And Animation – Fetch! Theme Song
- 2008 Daytime Emmy Nominations: Outstanding Writing in a Children's Series, Outstanding Original Song – Children's And Animation – Fetch! Theme Song, Outstanding Achievement in Single Camera Editing
- U.S. International Film and Video Festival 2008: First Place "Gold Camera Award" in the Children's Programming category
- Clarion Award 2008 Competition: Winner – Television Special Audience Program
- Parents' Choice Awards 2008: Silver Honor Winner: Web site, Recommended Award Winner: TV show
- WorldFest Houston: Gold Remi Award for "TV Series – Family/Children"
- iParenting Media Award 2008: Winner – Television "2008 Best Products"
- PRIX JEUNESSE 2008 Festival: Runner-Up Fourth Place – Ages 7–11 Non-Fiction
- New York Festival International 2008: Bronze World Medal in Youth programs
- 2007 Daytime Emmy Nominations: Performer in an Animated Series, Original Song – Fetch! Theme Song
- U.S. International Film and Video Festival 2007: Second Place "Silver Screen Award" in the Children's Programming category
- Clarion Award 2007 Competition: Winner – Television Special Audience Program
- Parents' Choice Awards: 2007 Gold Award Winner
- WorldFest Houston: Bronze Remi Award for "TV Series – Family/Children"
