= Jim Conroy =

American actor

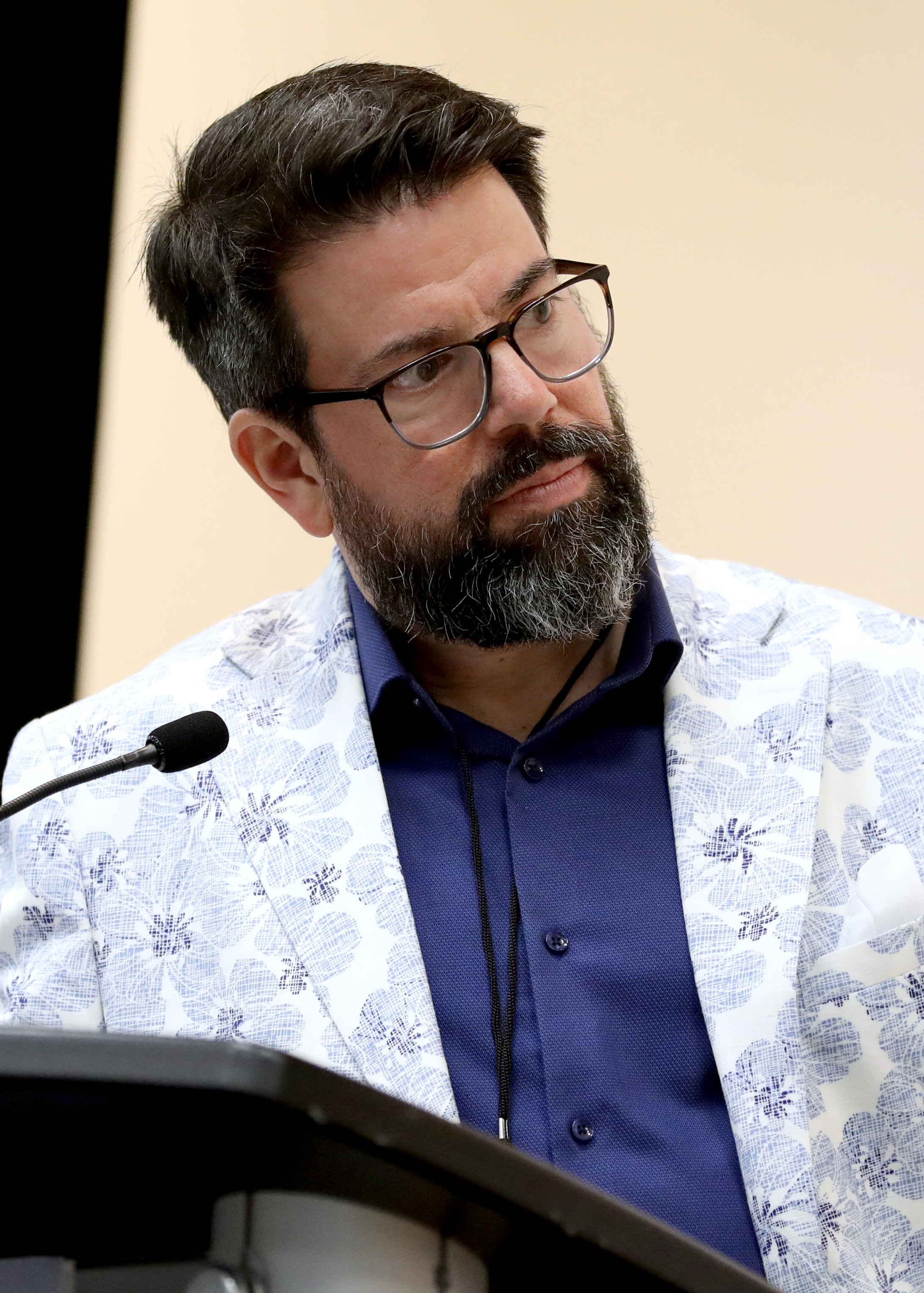
- Conroy at the 2024 WonderCon
- Occupations: Voice actor; television writer
- Years active: 1998–present
- Spouse: Jamie
- Children: 2

Jim Conroy is an American voice actor and television writer known for appearing on television shows and movies, such as The Cuphead Show!, Jellystone!, Kenny the Shark and Fetch! with Ruff Ruffman, as well as numerous radio commercials and video games. He has worked for WGBH, Hanna-Barbera, The Walt Disney Company and Discovery Channel.

== Career ==
Conroy began his career on MTV2's Celebrity Deathmatch. His first major role was Kenny the Shark for Discovery Kids. He later voiced Mr. Duck on Disney Channel's Mr. Pig & Mr. Duck and made special appearances on Saturday Night Live in 2005. Conroy also voices Steve the Shark in Fiber One's granola bar commercials.

In 2023, it was announced that he would voice Bud Humphrey in Primos.

== Filmography ==
=== Animation ===
- The Cuphead Show! – Ollie Bulb, Jasper and Duke
- The Casagrandes – Candy Goblin (in "Curse of the Candy Goblin")
- Jellystone! – Mayor Huckleberry Hound, Barney Rubble (as Captain Caveman), Paw Rugg, Yippee, Bingo, Zorak, Speed Buggy, Ugh, Robot Jones
- Rio 2 – Capoeira Turtle
- Epic – Race Announcer, Additional Voices
- Ice Age: Continental Drift – Additional Voices
- Top Cat: The Movie – Additional Voices
- Kung Fu Magoo – Mr. Magoo
- Fetch! with Ruff Ruffman – Ruff Ruffman and all the Ruffman family members for the show and its spin-offs.
- Kenny the Shark - Kenny
- Celebrity Deathmatch – Various Celebrities
- Night at the Museum: Kahmunrah Rises Again – Alexander Hamilton (deleted scene)
- Primos – Bud Humphrey, Vision Tiger, Additional Voices

=== Video games ===
- Red Dead Redemption 2 – Chelonian Master / Anders Helgerson
- Grand Theft Auto V – Butch
- Star Wars: The Old Republic – Additional Voices
- Red Dead Redemption – Andrew McAllister
- Grand Theft Auto IV: The Ballad of Gay Tony – Butch / Soldier
- Grand Theft Auto IV: The Lost and Damned – Butch / Hispanic Alien
- Order Up! – Hashi Ichiro / Bob Manhorn / Generic Patron
- Grand Theft Auto IV – Butch

=== TV appearances ===
- Neon Joe, Werewolf Hunter – Announcer
- Manhattan Love Story – Not So Deaf Guy
- Saturday Night Live – Mr. President

=== Film appearances ===
- Mooch – Hans
- Sender – Virgil Haraday
- Captain Blackout – Billy the Porter
- Montclair – Open-Mic Host

=== Commercials ===
- Fiber One – Voice of Steve the Shark
- AT&T – Bearded Man
- Captain D's – Voice of Desmond the "D-Gull"
- Kraft Dressing – Voice Over
- Pop-Tarts – Voice of Lizard, Additional Voices
- TD Ameritrade – Financial Advisor
- Xiidra – Biff

=== Shorts ===
- The Game – JP
- Caddie Video – Wally the Bad Caddie
- SW 2.5 (The Pitch Wars) – Steven Spielberg, Robert Altman, Larry Wachowski, James Earl Jones-Type Ant

=== Narrative podcasts ===
- The Foxes of Hydesvile - John Fox, E.E. Lewis, Isaac Post
