= Warbelow's Air Ventures =

Airline of the United States

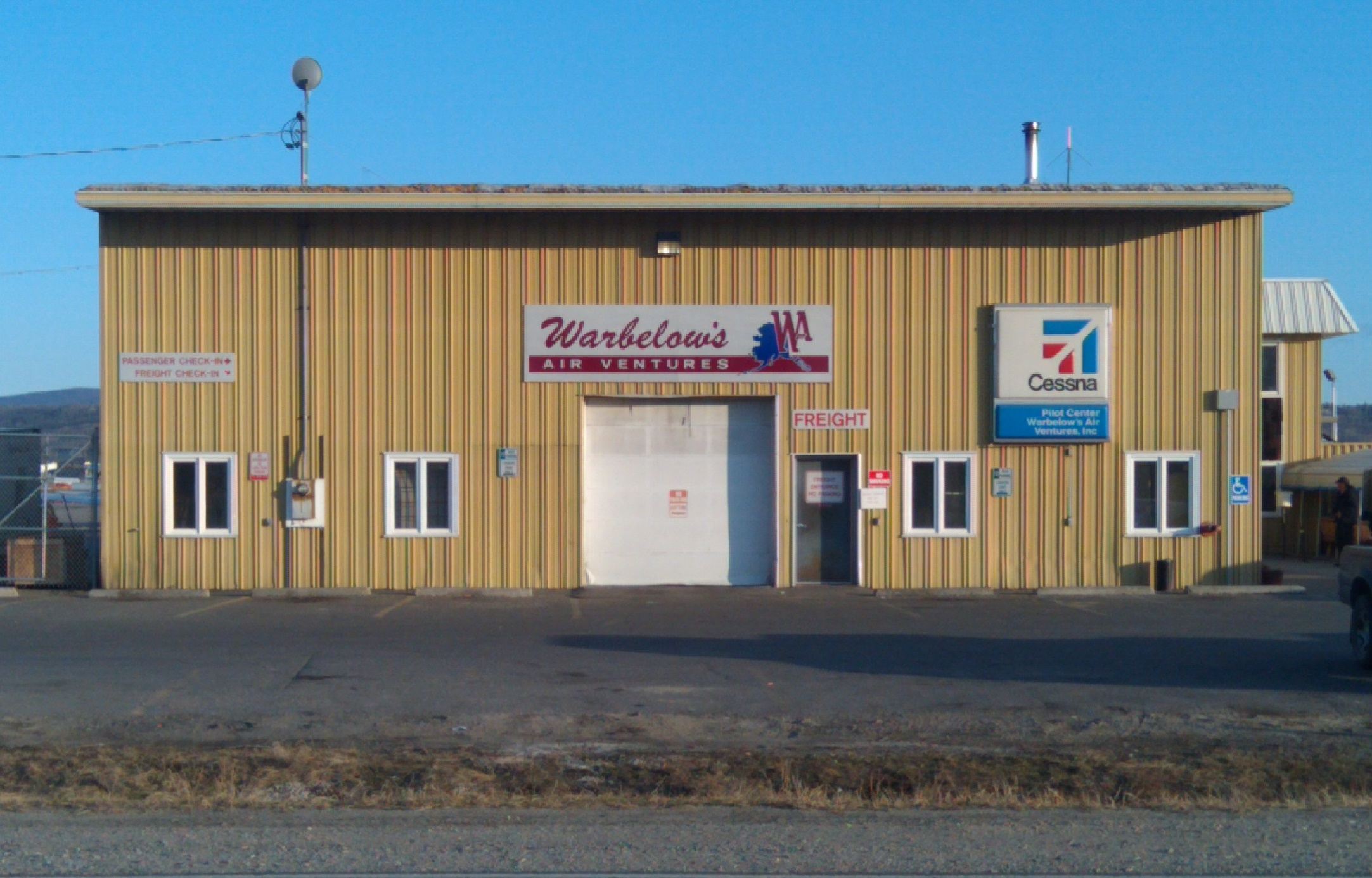
IATA	ICAO	Call sign
4W	WAV	WARBELOW
- Founded: 1958
- AOC #: WVBA620S
- Hubs: East Ramp of Fairbanks International Airport
- Alliance: Northern Alaska Tour Company; Air Arctic, Inc.
- Fleet size: 16 (inc. 9 operated by Air Arctic)
- Destinations: 12
- Headquarters: Fairbanks, Alaska, US
- Key people: Marvin E. Warbelow (founder); Art Warbelow (owner)
- Website: www.warbelows.com

Warbelow's Air Ventures is an American regional airline based in Fairbanks, Alaska, United States. It operates domestic scheduled passenger, charter, and tour services as well as flight tours, mostly throughout Interior Alaska. Its base is Fairbanks International Airport.

== History ==
The company was founded by Marvin E. Warbelow in 1958. It operated as 40-Mile Air (in reference to the Fortymile River) from 1970 to 1989, when it was split into two companies by Marvin's sons Charlie and Art. The base in Fairbanks, Alaska operated by Art Warbelow then assumed the name Warbelow's Air Ventures, Inc.. The base in Tok, Alaska continued to operate under the 40-Mile Air, Ltd. name. It was subsequently sold by Charlie Warbelow and continues to operate, mostly serving destinations along the Alaska portion of the Alaska Highway.

== Fleet ==
The Warbelow's Air Ventures fleet consists of at least 16 planes (9 of which are operated by the Warbelow's subsidiary Air Arctic), and includes the following:

- 15 Piper PA-31 Navajo Chieftain

== Destinations ==
All destinations are in Alaska. The airline provides Essential Air Service from Fairbanks to Central, Circle, Minto.

- Beaver (WBQ) - Beaver Airport
- Central (CEM) - Central Airport
- Circle (IRC) - Circle City Airport
- Fairbanks (FAI) - Fairbanks International Airport (hub)
- Fort Yukon (FYU) - Fort Yukon Airport
- Manley (MLY) - Manley Airport
- Minto (MNT) - Minto Airport
- Rampart (RMP) - Rampart Airport
- Stevens Village (SVS) - Stevens Village Airport

== See also ==
- List of airlines of Alaska
