= Beaver Airport =

- IATA: WBQ; ICAO: PAWB; FAA LID: WBQ

Summary
- Airport type: Public
- Owner: Alaska DOT&PF - Northern Region
- Serves: Beaver, Alaska
- Elevation AMSL: 359 ft (109 m)
- Coordinates: 66°21′44″N 147°24′24″W

Map
- Location of airport in Alaska

Runways
Direction	Length		Surface
Direction	ft	m	Surface
5/23	3,934	1,199	Gravel/dirt

Statistics (2015)
- Aircraft operations: 800
- Based aircraft: 0
- Passengers: 1,288
- Freight: 98,000 lbs
- Source: Federal Aviation Administration

Beaver Airport (IATA: WBQ, ICAO: PAWB, FAA LID: WBQ) is a state-owned, public-use airport located in the village of Beaver in the Yukon-Koyukuk Census Area of the U.S. state of Alaska.

== Facilities and aircraft ==
Beaver Airport covers an area of 446 acres (180 ha) and has one runway designated 5/23 with a gravel surface measuring 3,954 by 75 feet (1,205 by 23 m). For the 12-month period ending December 31, 2005, the airport had 800 aircraft operations, an average of 67 per month: 75% general aviation and 25% air taxi.

== Airlines and destinations ==
Airlines	Destinations
Warbelow's Air Ventures	Fairbanks

=== Statistics ===
Carrier shares: May 2022 – April 2023
Carrier	Passengers (arriving and departing)
Warbelow's	1,380(99.57%)
Everts Air	10(0.43%)

Top domestic destinations: May 2022 – April 2023
Rank	City	Airport	Passengers
1	(Alaska) Fairbanks, AK	Fairbanks International Airport	680
2	(Alaska) Stevens Village, AK	Stevens Village Airport	10

== See also ==
- List of airports in Alaska
