= National Register of Historic Places listings in Yukon–Koyukuk Census Area, Alaska =

Location of the Yukon-Koyukuk Census Area in Alaska

This is a list of the National Register of Historic Places listings in Yukon–Koyukuk Census Area, Alaska.

It is intended to be a complete list of the properties and districts on the National Register of Historic Places in Yukon-Koyukuk Census Area, Alaska, United States. The locations of National Register properties and districts for which the latitude and longitude coordinates are included below, may be seen in an online map.

There are 18 properties and districts listed on the National Register in the census area. Another 2 properties were once listed but have been removed.

This National Park Service list is complete through NPS recent listings posted June 6, 2026.

== Current listings ==
	Name on the Register	Image	Date listed	Location	City or town	Description
1	Alaska Road Commission Shelter Cabin-Fritz's		August 20, 2021 (#100006832)	North side of Hunter Trail, approx. 34 miles (55 km) from Ophir; 62°57′32″N 157°19′39″W	Ophir vicinity	Also abbreviated to ARC Shelter Cabin or referred to as Fritz's Roadhouse Site; colloquially known as Don's Cabin.
2	Ed Beiderman Fish Camp	Ed Beiderman Fish Camp	July 20, 1987 (#87001204)	Left bank of Yukon River, about 56 miles (90 km) northwest of Eagle; 65°22′34″N 142°32′18″W	Eagle	Yukon-Charley Rivers National Preserve
3	Bettles Lodge		May 8, 1997 (#97000401)	1 Airline Drive, Bettles Field; 66°55′05″N 151°31′06″W	Bettles	
4	Central House		July 31, 1978 (#78003431)	Mile 128 of Steese Highway; 65°34′21″N 144°47′56″W	Central	Building collapsed at an uncertain date and is no more standing. (Note: Building remains are still visible, shortly east of Crooked Creek bridge, on Streetview.)
5	Christ Church Mission	Christ Church Mission	May 8, 1980 (#80004572)	Corner of Main Road and River Road; 62°39′20″N 160°12′11″W	Anvik	
6	Coal Creek Historic Mining District	Coal Creek Historic Mining District	May 4, 1995 (#95000573)	Along Coal Creek, about 44 miles (71 km) southeast of Circle; 65°18′12″N 143°09′22″W	Circle	Yukon-Charley Rivers National Preserve
7	George McGregor Cabin	George McGregor Cabin	July 21, 1987 (#87001199)	About 2 miles (3.2 km) west of Coal Creek; 65°21′11″N 143°11′48″W	Eagle	Yukon-Charley Rivers National Preserve
8	Mission Church		April 11, 1977 (#77001578)	Main Street; 68°07′44″N 145°32′18″W	Arctic Village	
9	Nenana Depot	Nenana Depot	August 10, 1977 (#77000229)	900 A Street; 64°33′52″N 149°05′45″W	Nenana	Building now hosting the Alaska State Railroad Museum.
10	Old Mission House		November 7, 1978 (#78000539)	Along Winter Trail; 66°33′57″N 145°16′36″W	Fort Yukon	Building not standing anymore at its original location. It is unclear whether it has been destroyed or relocated elsewhere in Fort Yukon. (Note: Compare modern satellite imagery with Old Mission House NRHP form containing a sketch map, this 1950 aerial image and this 1972 aerial image where the building is visible.)
11	Presentation of Our Lord Chapel	Presentation of Our Lord Chapel	June 6, 1980 (#80004584)	Along Telida Trail; 63°00′45″N 154°22′35″W	Nikolai	
12	Rohn CCC Cabin and Tatina Aviation Field Reserve		June 12, 2026 (#100013113)	Confluence of the South Fork of the Kuskokwim River and the Tatina (formerly Rohn) River; 62°17′46″N 153°22′31″W	Yukon-Koyukuk Census Area	
13	Ruby Roadhouse		May 20, 1982 (#82004898)	On Olson Street, between Ruby-Poorman Drive and Sulatna Road; 64°44′20″N 155°29′46″W	Ruby	
14	Frank Slaven Roadhouse	Frank Slaven Roadhouse	July 20, 1987 (#87001202)	Mouth of Coal Creek, about 42 miles (68 km) southeast of Circle; 65°21′02″N 143°07′22″W	Circle	Yukon-Charley Rivers National Preserve
15	Sourdough Inn		December 30, 1997 (#97001585)	Northwest corner of 1st Avenue and Sled Road; 66°33′49″N 145°16′20″W	Fort Yukon	Building not standing anymore at its original location. It is unclear whether it has been destroyed or relocated elsewhere in Fort Yukon.
16	Tanana Mission	Tanana Mission	August 3, 1977 (#77000230)	At end of Cemetery Road, about 2.5 miles (4.0 km) east of Tanana; 65°10′28″N 151°59′47″W	Tanana	
17	Tolovana Roadhouse	Tolovana Roadhouse	October 7, 1988 (#88000402)	At the confluence of Tanana and Tolovana Rivers, about 29 miles (47 km) northwest of Nenana; 64°51′13″N 149°49′29″W	Nenana	
18	Woodchopper Roadhouse	Woodchopper Roadhouse	July 20, 1987 (#87001201)	About 1 mile (1.6 km) east of Woodchopper Creek; 65°21′22″N 143°18′17″W	Circle	Yukon-Charley Rivers National Preserve

== Former listings ==
	Name on the Register	Image	Date listed	Date removed	Location	City or town	Description
1	Miller House		November 5, 1971 (#71001092)	November 6, 1971	Mile 114.2, Steese Highway, about 12.5 miles (20.1 km) west of Central; 65°31′25″N 145°13′30″W	Central	Destroyed by fire in 1970.
2	James Taylor Cabins		July 20, 1987 (#87001203)	August 7, 2000	North bank of the Yukon opposite Fourth of July Creek, about 34 miles (55 km) northwest of Eagle; 65°12′40″N 141°47′10″W	Eagle	Destroyed by forest fire in 1999.

== See also ==
- List of National Historic Landmarks in Alaska
- National Register of Historic Places listings in Alaska
