= Woodchopper Roadhouse =

- U.S. National Register of Historic Places
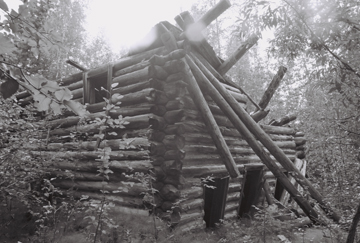

- Location within Alaska
- Location: About 1 mile (1.6 km) east of Woodchopper Creek
- Nearest city: Circle, Alaska
- Coordinates: 65°21′22″N 143°18′17″W
- Area: 2 acres (0.81 ha)
- Built: c. 1910
- MPS: Yukon River Lifeways TR
- NRHP reference No.: 87001201
- Added to NRHP: July 20, 1987

The Woodchopper Roadhouse, on the Yukon River, is a historic establishment that was built in approximately 1910. It is located in the Yukon-Charley Rivers National Preserve. It served as a hotel and as a post office. Its log building was listed on the National Register of Historic Places in 1987.

The two-story approximately 23-by-32-foot (7.0 m × 9.8 m) building is built from approximately 10-inch (250 mm) logs, peeled but not hewn. It is "the largest and oldest log structure on the Yukon between Eagle and Circle", and in fact is located halfway between, so it has served as a stopover point. For example, the Biedermmans of Ed Biederman Fish Camp used it as a stopover for dog sledding the mail up and down the frozen Yukon River. The site was also a steamboat stop, in the summer.

== See also ==
- National Register of Historic Places listings in Yukon-Charley Rivers National Preserve
- National Register of Historic Places listings in Yukon–Koyukuk Census Area, Alaska
