= Coal Creek Historic Mining District =

Historic district in Alaska, United States

- Folk Valley
- U.S. National Register of Historic Places
- U.S. Historic district
- Alaska Heritage Resources Survey
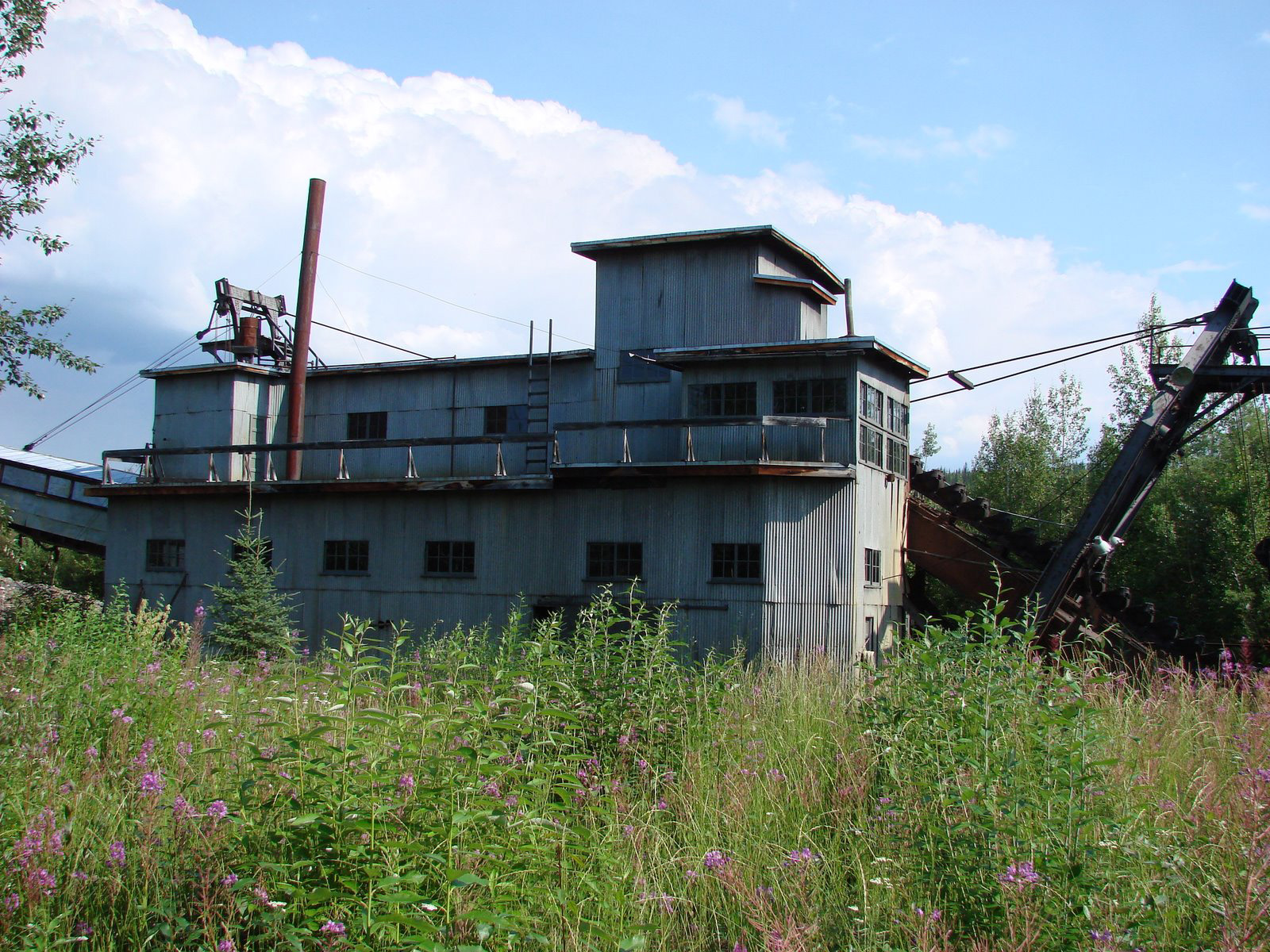
- Coal Creek Dredge

- Location within Alaska
- Location: Along Coal Creek, about 44 miles (71 km) southeast of Circle
- Nearest city: Circle, Alaska
- Coordinates: 65°18′12″N 143°09′22″W
- Area: 349.81 acres (141.56 ha)
- Built: 1933
- Architect: Ernest N. Patty; et al.
- MPS: Yukon River Lifeways TR
- NRHP reference No.: 95000573
- AHRS No.: CHR-089
- Added to NRHP: May 4, 1995

The Coal Creek Historic Mining District (a.k.a Folk Valley) (Hän: Zhùr näddhä`ww juu) is a gold-mining area in the Yukon-Charley Rivers National Preserve of Alaska dating from the 1930s. It features a gold dredge and a supporting community of several dozen buildings, established by mining entrepreneur Ernest Patty.

The listed area includes the last 8 miles (13 km) of Coal Creek before the Yukon River, where, at the mouth, the roadhouse Slaven's Cabin is included. It includes two former locations and the current location of the gold dredging operation. It includes 26 contributing buildings and 12 contributing structures and three contributing sites. The architecture is strictly functional, besides the roadhouse.

The district contains buildings, structures, a dredge, water system, tailings piles, and other mine engineering sites and objects that together represent Alaskan dredge mining operations of the 1930s. The majority of buildings and structures were built between 1934 and 1940. The mining camp has been moved twice from its original site. The design, materials, and construction of the buildings all reflect the utilitarian and remote nature of the camp. Except for Slaven's Roadhouse, workmanship is strictly functional: competent but uninspired. Nothing detracts from the feeling of a remote placer mining operation of the 20th century. The district contains 26 contributing buildings, 3 sites, and 12 structures. The noncontributing items include 5 buildings and 2 structures.

In 1941, the camp was apparently moved from its original location near the mouth of Cheese Creek to a hillside location near Snare Creek, and in 1952 to the present location at Beaton Pup. The original camp site was dredged over in 1941. The creek has since changed channels and today flows through a portion of the first site.

The dredge is the most significant relic in the district. It is a medium-sized diesel-powered floating dredge. It was built by the Walter W. Johnson Company of Oakland, California and shipped in pieces to Skagway, then by rail to Whitehorse, Yukon Territory and by barge down the Yukon River.

The encampment moved three times. It was first established near the mouth of Cheese Creek in 1934, then moved to a location near Snare Creek in 1941. The final move brought it to its present location at Beaton Pup. The first site has not survived, having been dredged over. The second site has been altered by changes in the course of the creek. The Frank Slaven Roadhouse, separately listed on the National Register of Historic Places, is nearby and is included in the district. The third camp survives nearly intact, with its equipment and historic context preserved.

The placer operation was managed by mining engineer Ernest Patty, who arrived in Alaska in 1922 and had become an instructor at the University of Alaska in Fairbanks. Patty was to return to what had become the University of Alaska in 1953 as president of the university, retiring in 1960.

== Contributing Properties ==
The main contributing properties to the historic districts are:

- The Slaven's Cabin, 65°21′02″N 143°07′22″W, AHRS# CHR-030, built 1928-1930.
- The historic road along Coal Creek, 65°18′32″N 143°08′56″W.
- Tailings piles, 65°19′26″N 143°07′02″W.
- The dredge, 65°20′05″N 143°06′51″W built 1935.
- The Coal Creek Mining Camp, comprising 21 contributing buildings, 65°18′19″N 143°09′14″W, built 1936-1941.
- The cabin ruins along Snare Creek, 65°18′05″N 143°11′02″W.
- The ditch, 65°16′58″N 143°14′06″W and its intercept with Coal Creek 65°16′22″N 143°17′06″W built in 1935.
- The Cheese Creek Camp, 65°17′02″N 143°12′40″W, AHRS# CHR-094, built 1936-1941.

== See also ==
- National Register of Historic Places listings in Yukon-Charley Rivers National Preserve
- National Register of Historic Places listings in Yukon–Koyukuk Census Area, Alaska
- Chatanika gold dredge (Fairbanks)
- F. E. Company Dredge No. 4
- Goldstream Dredge No. 8
