= Mission Church =

Mission Church can refer to:

- Mission church, in some Christian denominations, a church that does not have full status as a parish church, and is supported by an external organization, such as a parish or diocese
- Mission Church (Michigan), on Mackinac Island, built 1823
- Mission Church (Arctic Village, Alaska), built 1917
- Basilica and Shrine of Our Lady of Perpetual Help in Boston, built 1878, also known as the Mission Church
- Mission Covenant Church of Norway
- Mission Covenant Church of Sweden
- Mission churches, built by Spanish missions in the Americas

== See also ==
- Christian mission
