= Central Airport =

Airport in Alaska, United States

- IATA: CEM; ICAO: PACE; FAA LID: CEM

Summary
- Airport type: Public
- Owner: State of Alaska DOT&PF - Northern Region
- Serves: Central, Alaska
- Elevation AMSL: 937 ft (286 m)
- Coordinates: 65°34′26″N 144°46′51″W

Map
- Location of airport in Alaska

Runways
| Direction | Length | | Surface |
| Direction | ft | m | Surface |
|---|---|---|---|
| 8/26 | 2,782 | 848 | Gravel/dirt |

Statistics (2015)
- Aircraft operations: 4,000
- Based aircraft: 0
- Passengers: 21
- Freight: 28,000 lbs
- Source: Federal Aviation Administration

Central Airport (IATA: CEM, ICAO: PACE, FAA LID: CEM) is a state-owned public-use airport located in Central, in the Yukon-Koyukuk Census Area of the U.S. state of Alaska. Commercial service is subsidized by the Essential Air Service program.

As per Federal Aviation Administration records, the airport had 47 passenger boardings (enplanements) in calendar year 2008, 13 enplanements in 2009, and 20 in 2010. It is included in the National Plan of Integrated Airport Systems for 2011–2015, which categorized it as a general aviation airport.

== Facilities and aircraft ==
Central Airport covers an area of 97 acres (39 ha) at an elevation of 937 feet (286 m) above mean sea level. It has one runway designated 7/25 with a gravel surface measuring 2,782 by 60 feet (848 x 18 m). For the 12-month period ending December 31, 2005, the airport had 4,000 aircraft operations, an average of 10 per day: 62.5% air taxi and 37.5% general aviation.

== Airlines and destinations ==
| Airlines | Destinations |
|---|---|
| Warbelow's Air Ventures | Circle, Fairbanks |

=== Statistics ===
Carrier shares: April 2021 – March 2022
| Carrier | Passengers (arriving and departing) |
|---|---|
| Warbelow's | 60(100.00%) |

Top domestic destinations: April 2021 – March 2022
| Rank | City | Airport | Passengers |
|---|---|---|---|
| 1 | (Alaska) Fairbanks, AK | Fairbanks International Airport | 30 |

== See also ==
- List of airports in Alaska

== Other sources ==
- Essential Air Service documents (Docket OST-1998-3621) from the U.S. Department of Transportation:
  - Order 2003-11-1 (November 3, 2003): re-selecting Warbelow's Air Ventures, Inc. to continue providing essential air service at Central and Circle, Alaska, for the period beginning December 1, 2003, and ending November 30, 2005, at an annual subsidy of $56,932.
  - Order 2005-9-19 (September 19, 2005): re-selecting Warbelow's Air Ventures, Inc. to provide essential air service (EAS) to Central and Circle, Alaska, and establishing a subsidy rate of $124,841 per year for service consisting of five round trips each week routed Fairbanks-Central-Circle-Fairbanks with 8-seat Piper Navajo aircraft.
  - Order 2007-10-6 (October 4, 2007): re-selecting Warbelow's Air Ventures, Inc., to provide subsidized essential air service (EAS) at Central and Circle, Alaska, at an annual subsidy rate of $171,223 for the period of December 1, 2007, through November 30, 2009.
  - Order 2009-9-17 (September 25, 2009): re-selecting Warbelow's Air Service to provide essential air service (EAS) at Central and Circle, Alaska, at annual subsidy rate of $203,360 from December 1, 2009, through April 30, 2011.
  - Order 2011-9-11 (September 15, 2011): re-selecting Warbelow's Air Ventures, Inc., to provide essential air service (EAS) at Central and Circle, Alaska, for a combined annual subsidy of $275,598 ($137,799 for each community). Warbelow's will provide five weekly round trips over a Fairbanks-Central-Circle-Fairbanks routing from December 1, 2011, through November 30, 2013. Warbelow's will use 8-seat Piper PA31-350 aircraft but will gradually phase in 9-seat Cessna 208B aircraft as the carrier retires the PA31-350.
