= Central House =

Central House may refer to:

- Central House (Central, Alaska), listed on the NRHP in Alaska
- Central House (Orangeville, Illinois), listed on the NRHP in Illinois
- Central House (Napoleon, Indiana), listed on the NRHP in Indiana

== See also ==
- Central House Hotel, Boscobel, Wisconsin, listed on the NRHP in Wisconsin
