= Biederman's Cabin =

- Ed Beiderman Fish Camp
- U.S. National Register of Historic Places
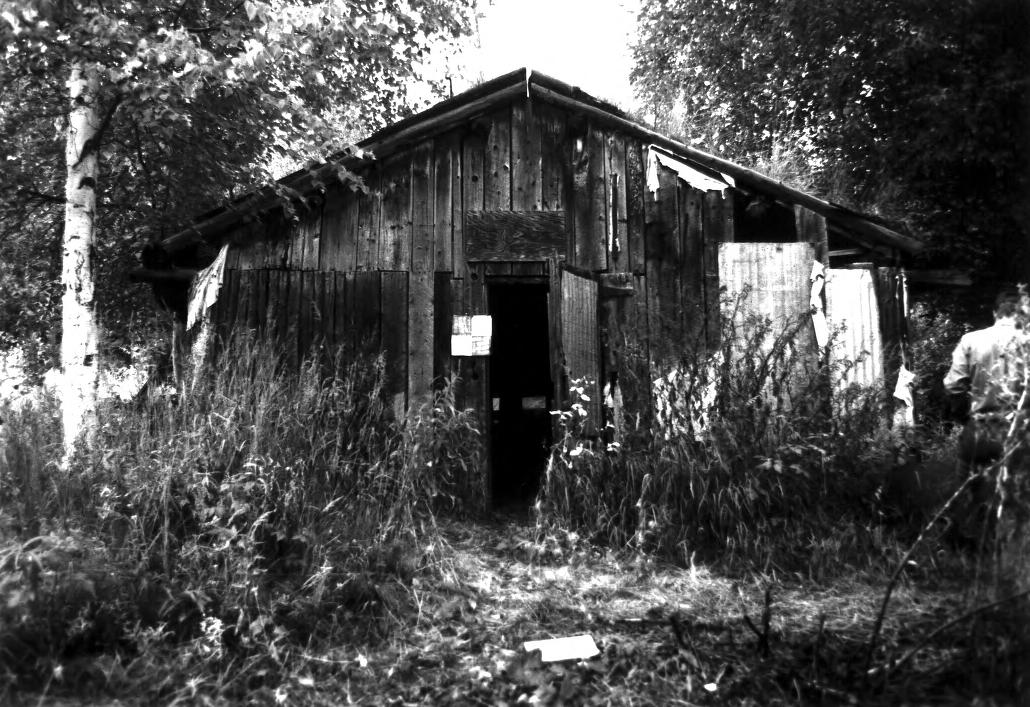

- Location within Alaska
- Location: Left bank of Yukon River, about 56 miles (90 km) northwest of Eagle
- Nearest city: Eagle, Alaska
- Coordinates: 65.37623°N 142.53836°W
- Area: 1.3 acres (0.53 ha)
- Built: 1916
- Built by: Ed Biederman
- MPS: Yukon River Lifeways TR
- NRHP reference No.: 87001204
- Added to NRHP: July 20, 1987

Biederman's Cabin, also known as Biederman's Fish Camp, is a privately owned cabin on the Yukon River in Alaska. Located within the Yukon-Charley Rivers National Preserve, it is maintained as a historic site representing the subsistence lifestyle employed by Interior Alaska residents during the early years of the 20th century and is one of the few structures within the preserve.

== Construction ==
The cabin was built in 1916 by Max Adolphus "Ed" Biederman for his family. Biederman was an immigrant to the United States from Bohemia, and was attracted to Alaska in 1899 by the Nome Gold Rush. After failing to strike it rich, Biederman became a sled dog driver instead. In 1912, he began running the Eagle to Circle mail route along the Yukon River. In 1916, he constructed the 31 feet (9 m)-long log cabin and roofed it with sod. That year, his first daughter, Nellie Biederman, was born in the building.

Between 1916 and 1938, the Biederman family used the cabin as their summer residence after spending winters in Eagle while Ed ran his dog team and used the cabin as a waypoint between the two locations. Because other winter travelers needed a place to stay during the winter, Biederman constructed a small bunk house away from the cabin. To provide food for the many dogs Biederman owned as a result of the mail route, the family used the cabin as a fish camp and installed two fish wheels to catch salmon swimming upstream during the spawning season. Other additions were made to the cabin, including a tin roof to replace the sod and an Arctic entry. In 1938, the dog sled mail route was discontinued, and in 1945, Ed Biederman died.

== Use as shelter ==
After Biederman's death, the cabin fell into relative disuse by the family, though winter travelers continued to seek shelter in it. In 1984, the Yukon Quest, a 1,000-mile sled dog race between Fairbanks, Alaska, and Whitehorse, Yukon, chose the cabin as an official rest area along the trail. Though the cabin's official status has been superseded by nearby Slaven's Cabin, which is run by the National Park Service, it continues to serve as an informal hospitality stop for competitors in the race.

A nearby wildfire threatened the cabin in 2007, and the National Park Service installed temporary sprinklers at the site as a preventative measure.

== See also ==
- National Register of Historic Places listings in Yukon-Charley Rivers National Preserve
- National Register of Historic Places listings in Yukon–Koyukuk Census Area, Alaska
