= Circle City Airport =

Airport in Alaska, U.S.

- IATA: IRC; ICAO: PACR; FAA LID: CRC

Summary
- Airport type: Public
- Owner: State of Alaska DOT&PF - Northern Region
- Serves: Circle, Alaska
- Elevation AMSL: 613 ft (187 m)
- Coordinates: 65°49′40″N 144°04′34″W

Map
- Location of airport in Alaska

Runways
Direction	Length		Surface
Direction	ft	m	Surface
15/33	2,979	908	Gravel/dirt

Statistics (2015)
- Aircraft operations: 1,110
- Based aircraft: 0
- Passengers: 448
- Freight: 46,000 lbs
- Source: Federal Aviation Administration

Circle City Airport (IATA: IRC, ICAO: PACR, FAA LID: CRC) is a state-owned public-use airport located in Circle (also known as Circle City), in the Yukon-Koyukuk Census Area of the U.S. state of Alaska. It is also known as Circle City (New) Airport. Scheduled commercial airline service is subsidized by the Essential Air Service program.

As per Federal Aviation Administration records, the airport had 303 passenger boardings (enplanements) in calendar year 2008, 377 enplanements in 2009, and 355 in 2010. It is included in the National Plan of Integrated Airport Systems for 2011–2015, which categorized it as a general aviation airport (the commercial service category requires at least 2,500 enplanements per year).

Although most U.S. airports use the same three-letter location identifier for the FAA and IATA, this airport is assigned CRC by the FAA and IRC by the IATA (which assigned CRC to the Santa Ana Airport in Cartago, Colombia). The airport's ICAO identifier is PACR.

== Facilities and aircraft ==
Circle City Airport covers an area of 324 acres (131 ha) at an elevation of 613 feet (187 m) above mean sea level. It has one runway designated 15/33 with a gravel surface measuring 2,979 by 60 feet (908 x 18 m). For the 12-month period ending December 31, 2005, the airport had 1,110 aircraft operations, an average of 92 per month: 63% general aviation, 36% air taxi, and 1% military.

== Airlines and destinations ==
The following airlines offer scheduled passenger service at this airport:

Airlines	Destinations
Warbelow's Air Ventures	Central, Fairbanks

=== Statistics ===
Carrier shares: January – December 2015
Carrier	Passengers (arriving and departing)
Warbelow's	440(98.88%)
Everts Air	10(1.12%)

Top domestic destinations: January – December 2015
Rank	City	Airport	Passengers
1	(Alaska) Fairbanks, AK	Fairbanks International Airport	250

== See also ==
- List of airports in Alaska

== Other sources ==
- Essential Air Service documents (Docket OST-1998-3621) from the U.S. Department of Transportation:
  - Order 2003-11-1 (November 3, 2003): re-selecting Warbelow's Air Ventures, Inc. to continue providing essential air service at Central and Circle, Alaska, for the period beginning December 1, 2003, and ending November 30, 2005, at an annual subsidy of $56,932.
  - Order 2005-9-19 (September 19, 2005): re-selecting Warbelow's Air Ventures, Inc. to provide essential air service (EAS) to Central and Circle, Alaska, and establishing a subsidy rate of $124,841 per year for service consisting of five round trips each week routed Fairbanks-Central-Circle-Fairbanks with 8-seat Piper Navajo aircraft.
  - Order 2007-10-6 (October 4, 2007): re-selecting Warbelow's Air Ventures, Inc., to provide subsidized essential air service (EAS) at Central and Circle, Alaska, at an annual subsidy rate of $171,223 for the period of December 1, 2007, through November 30, 2009.
  - Order 2009-9-17 (September 25, 2009): re-selecting Warbelow's Air Service to provide essential air service (EAS) at Central and Circle, Alaska, at annual subsidy rate of $203,360 from December 1, 2009, through April 30, 2011.
  - Order 2011-9-11 (September 15, 2011): re-selecting Warbelow's Air Ventures, Inc., to provide essential air service (EAS) at Central and Circle, Alaska, for a combined annual subsidy of $275,598 ($137,799 for each community). Warbelow's will provide five weekly round trips over a Fairbanks-Central-Circle-Fairbanks routing from December 1, 2011, through November 30, 2013. Warbelow's will use 8-seat Piper PA31-350 aircraft but will gradually phase in 9-seat Cessna 208B aircraft as the carrier retires the PA31-350.
