= WBQ =

WBQ may refer to:

- WBQ, the IATA and FAA LID code for Beaver Airport, an airport in Beaver, Alaska
- WBQ, the National Rail code for Warrington Bank Quay railway station, Cheshire, England
- WBQ-8, a former callsign of Australian station STQ
- Welsh Baccalaureate Qualification, an educational qualification delivered in secondary schools and colleges across Wales
