= Evansville, Alaska =

- CDP
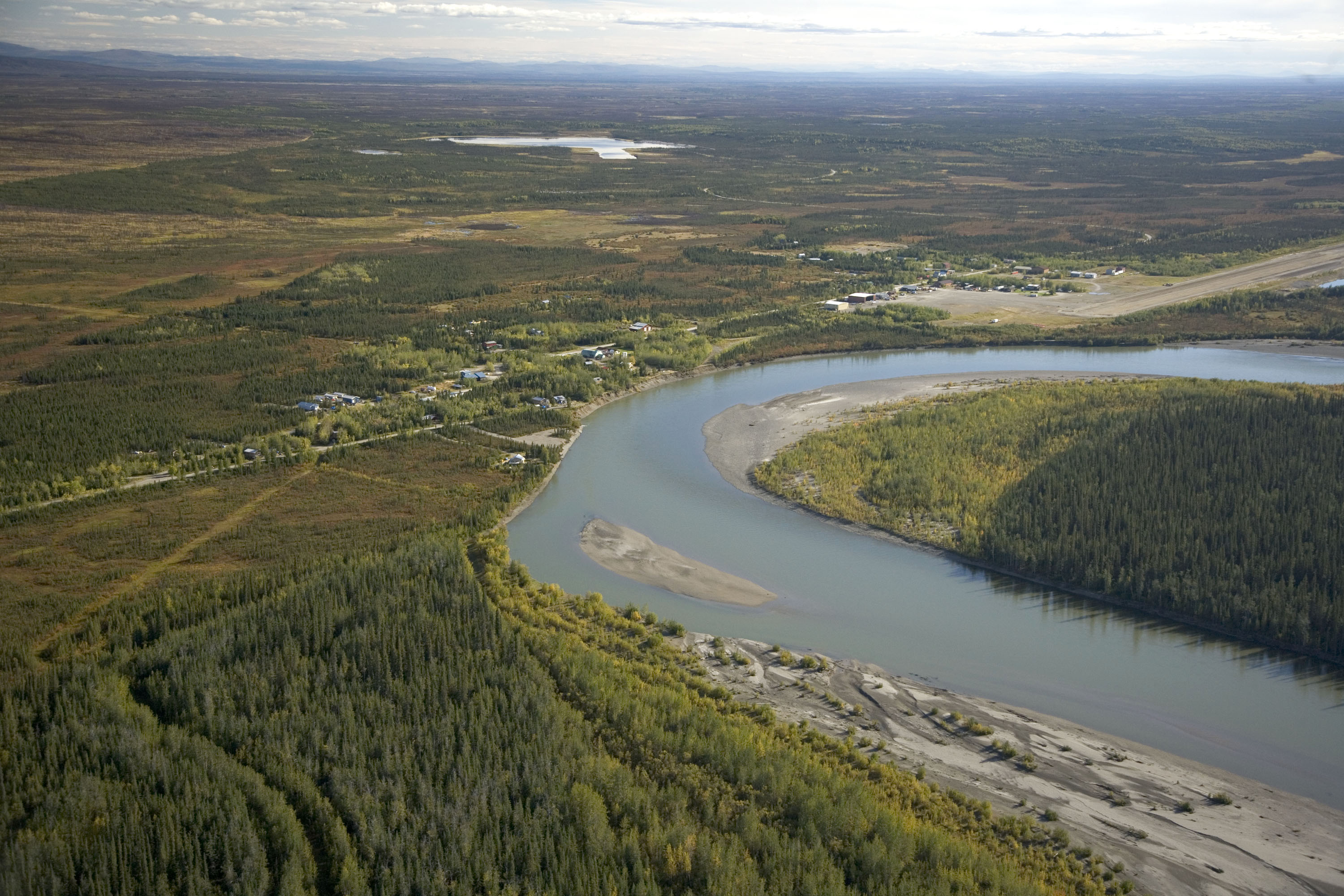
- Aerial view of Evansville (left) and its neighbor Bettles (right)

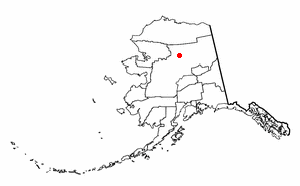
- Location of Evansville, Alaska
- Coordinates: 66°54′11″N 151°29′57″W
- Country: United States
- State: Alaska
- Census Area: Yukon-Koyukuk

Government
  - State senator: Click Bishop (R)
  - State rep.: Mike Cronk (R)

Area
  - Total: 23.17 sq mi (60.01 km^{2})
  - Land: 22.98 sq mi (59.51 km^{2})
  - Water: 0.19 sq mi (0.50 km^{2})

Population (2020)
  - Total: 12
  - Density: 0.52/sq mi (0.2/km^{2})
- Time zone: UTC-9 (Alaska (AKST))
  - Summer (DST): UTC-8 (AKDT)
- ZIP code: 99726
- Area code: 907
- FIPS code: 02-23790

Evansville is a census-designated place (CDP) in Yukon-Koyukuk Census Area, Alaska, United States. As of the 2020 census, Evansville had a population of 12. The community is adjacent to Bettles. The community is named after Wilford Evans, Sr, who took part in the founding of Bettles Lodge.

== Geography ==
Evansville is located on the southeast bank of the Koyukuk River at 66°54′11″N 151°29′57″W (66.902950, -151.499190). The community is on the former Hickel Highway, that now connects to the Dalton Highway as a winter ice road only and crosses the Jim River. Evansville is 35 miles (56 km) north of the Arctic Circle, just south of the Brooks Range, home of the Gates of the Arctic National Park and Preserve.

According to the United States Census Bureau, the CDP has a total area of 22.4 square miles (58 km^{2}), of which, 22.2 square miles (57 km^{2}) of it is land and 0.2 square miles (0.52 km^{2}) of it (0.85%) is water.

=== Climate ===
As with much of Interior Alaska, Evansville experiences a subarctic climate (Köppen Dfc) with very long, frigid winters and short, warm summers, and is located in USDA Plant Hardiness Zone 1, indicating the coldest temperature of the year is typically at or below −50 °F (−46 °C). Temperatures usually remain consistently below freezing from late October to late March, and the majority of the year's snow occurs from October to April, with lighter amounts in May and September; the average annual snowfall stands at 91 inches (2.31 m). In summer, temperatures reach 70 °F (21 °C) on 37 days and 80 °F (27 °C) on 6.4, with an average of 1 night not falling below 60 °F (16 °C). The first frost of the season usually begins in late August, but sometimes it can happen during the first half of that month. A majority of the annual precipitation of 14.9 inches (378 mm) occurs during summer as well. Extreme temperatures have ranged from −70 °F (−57 °C), recorded on January 4, 1975, up to 93 °F (34 °C), set on July 6, 1986.

Climate data for Evansville (Bettles Airport), Alaska (1991–2020 normals, (Note: Mean monthly maxima and minima (i.e. the highest and lowest temperature readings during an entire month or year) calculated based on data at said location from 1991 to 2020.) extremes 1944–present)
Month	Jan	Feb	Mar	Apr	May	Jun	Jul	Aug	Sep	Oct	Nov	Dec	Year
Record high °F (°C)	42 (6)	40 (4)	49 (9)	66 (19)	86 (30)	92 (33)	93 (34)	88 (31)	79 (26)	59 (15)	45 (7)	38 (3)	93 (34)
Mean maximum °F (°C)	26.1 (−3.3)	29.7 (−1.3)	35.1 (1.7)	51.9 (11.1)	73.5 (23.1)	82.5 (28.1)	83.7 (28.7)	75.9 (24.4)	64.5 (18.1)	45.2 (7.3)	28.5 (−1.9)	26.4 (−3.1)	85.0 (29.4)
Mean daily maximum °F (°C)	−2.4 (−19.1)	6.5 (−14.2)	16.6 (−8.6)	35.9 (2.2)	55.7 (13.2)	69.9 (21.1)	70.2 (21.2)	62.6 (17.0)	49.8 (9.9)	28.4 (−2.0)	7.6 (−13.6)	1.9 (−16.7)	33.6 (0.9)
Daily mean °F (°C)	−10.6 (−23.7)	−3.4 (−19.7)	3.7 (−15.7)	24.6 (−4.1)	45.0 (7.2)	58.6 (14.8)	59.8 (15.4)	52.7 (11.5)	41.2 (5.1)	21.3 (−5.9)	0.3 (−17.6)	−6.0 (−21.1)	23.9 (−4.5)
Mean daily minimum °F (°C)	−18.9 (−28.3)	−13.3 (−25.2)	−9.2 (−22.9)	13.2 (−10.4)	34.2 (1.2)	47.3 (8.5)	49.4 (9.7)	42.7 (5.9)	32.6 (0.3)	14.3 (−9.8)	−7.0 (−21.7)	−13.9 (−25.5)	14.3 (−9.8)
Mean minimum °F (°C)	−50.1 (−45.6)	−40.6 (−40.3)	−33.2 (−36.2)	−13.5 (−25.3)	18.0 (−7.8)	36.0 (2.2)	38.8 (3.8)	28.9 (−1.7)	17.2 (−8.2)	−9.9 (−23.3)	−31.4 (−35.2)	−42.4 (−41.3)	−53.4 (−47.4)
Record low °F (°C)	−70 (−57)	−64 (−53)	−56 (−49)	−39 (−39)	−10 (−23)	27 (−3)	29 (−2)	15 (−9)	0 (−18)	−35 (−37)	−57 (−49)	−60 (−51)	−70 (−57)
Average precipitation inches (mm)	0.87 (22)	0.96 (24)	0.61 (15)	0.60 (15)	0.89 (23)	1.46 (37)	2.32 (59)	2.71 (69)	2.13 (54)	1.17 (30)	1.15 (29)	1.14 (29)	16.01 (407)
Average snowfall inches (cm)	14.0 (36)	15.9 (40)	9.3 (24)	5.2 (13)	1.0 (2.5)	0.0 (0.0)	0.0 (0.0)	0.0 (0.0)	3.2 (8.1)	12.0 (30)	19.1 (49)	18.2 (46)	97.9 (249)
Average precipitation days (≥ 0.01 in)	9.1	9.8	7.8	6.2	8.6	11.4	13.4	15.2	12.9	12.4	10.7	11.4	128.9
Average snowy days (≥ 0.1 in)	10.5	10.8	8.6	5.0	1.3	0	0	0	2.6	11.1	11.8	12.6	74.3
Average relative humidity (%)	68.6	67.0	65.3	67.2	60.7	59.8	67.7	75.8	75.6	77.7	73.5	71.7	69.2
Average dew point °F (°C)	−17.3 (−27.4)	−16.1 (−26.7)	−6.5 (−21.4)	11.8 (−11.2)	29.7 (−1.3)	42.4 (5.8)	47.8 (8.8)	45.0 (7.2)	32.5 (0.3)	12.7 (−10.7)	−7.4 (−21.9)	−15.5 (−26.4)	13.3 (−10.4)
Source: NOAA (relative humidity and dew point 1961–1990)

== Demographics ==
Historical population
Census	Pop.	Note	%±
1970	57		—
1980	94		64.9%
1990	33		−64.9%
2000	28		−15.2%
2010	15		−46.4%
2020	12		−20.0%
U.S. Decennial Census

Evansville first appeared on the 1970 U.S. Census as an unincorporated village. In 1980, it was made a census-designated place (CDP).

As of the census of 2000, there were 28 people, 12 households, and 6 families residing in the CDP. The population density was 1.3 inhabitants per square mile (0.50/km^{2}). There were 30 housing units at an average density of 1.4 per square mile (0.54/km^{2}). The racial makeup of the CDP was 46.43% White, 50.00% Native American, and 3.57% from two or more races.

There were 12 households, out of which 25.0% had children under the age of 18 living with them, 41.7% were married couples living together, 8.3% had a female householder with no husband present, and 50.0% were non-families. 33.3% of all households were made up of individuals, and 16.7% had someone living alone who was 65 years of age or older. The average household size was 2.33 and the average family size was 3.33.

In the CDP, the population was spread out, with 28.6% under the age of 18, 7.1% from 18 to 24, 25.0% from 25 to 44, 14.3% from 45 to 64, and 25.0% who were 65 years of age or older. The median age was 34 years. For every 100 females, there were 115.4 males. For every 100 females age 18 and over, there were 100.0 males.

The median income for a household in the CDP was $53,750, and the median income for a family was $54,583. Males had a median income of $30,833 versus $0 for females. The per capita income for the CDP was $15,746. There were no families and 4.3% of the population living below the poverty line, including no under eighteens and none of those over 64.

== Transportation ==
Bettles Airport's commercial and freight airline service is provided by Wright Air Service, with daily service to and from Fairbanks and other communities. The Vor Lake Waterlane seaplane base is located in the community.

== Education ==
The community was previously served by the Bettles Field School of the Yukon–Koyukuk School District. The school, however was closed in the 2002-03 school year due to insufficient enrollment.
