= Tanana Mission =

Historic church in Alaska, United States

- U.S. National Register of Historic Places
- U.S. Historic district
- Alaska Heritage Resources Survey
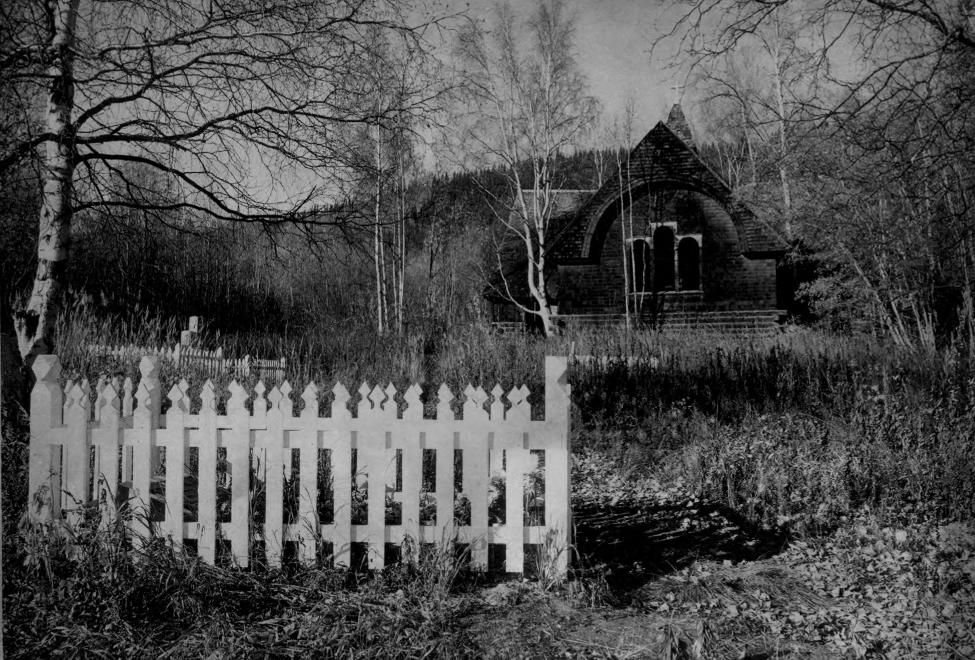

- Location within Alaska
- Location: At end of Cemetery Road, about 2.5 miles (4.0 km) east of Tanana, Alaska
- Coordinates: 65°10′28″N 151°59′47″W
- Area: 2.5 acres (1.0 ha)
- Built: 1899
- NRHP reference No.: 77000230
- AHRS No.: TAN-018

Significant dates
- Added to NRHP: August 3, 1977
- Designated AHRS: November 11, 1976

The Tanana Mission (also known as Mission of Our Saviour; Episcopal Mission) was a historic Episcopal church mission in Tanana, Alaska. Its abandoned church building and cemetery are listed on the U.S. National Register of Historic Places.

It was deemed significant as a site preserving artifacts of the once-large Episcopal mission, which additionally included a hospital, a sawmill, a rectory, and a school. The site is located about 3 miles up from the current Tanana village location. It was deemed "important to the history of interior Alaska as a place where permanent native (Indian) community was established near the mission which located itself opposite the prehistoric trading center of many interior Athapaskan Indians - Nuchalawoyya" and also as representing "a place where native people learned and participated in the activities of a foreign culture", and as a burial site, and as for the architecture of its church.

The church building has multiple gables above a 52-by-48-foot (16 m × 15 m) plan. It was built in 1899 and added to the National Register in 1977.

== See also ==
- National Register of Historic Places listings in Yukon–Koyukuk Census Area, Alaska
