= Ruby Roadhouse =

- U.S. National Register of Historic Places
- Alaska Heritage Resources Survey
- Location within Alaska
- Location: On Olson Street, between Ruby-Poorman Drive and Sulatna Road, Ruby, Alaska
- Coordinates: 64°44′20″N 155°29′46″W
- Area: 0.5 acres (0.20 ha)
- Built by: Multiple
- NRHP reference No.: 82004898
- AHRS No.: RUB-008
- Added to NRHP: May 20, 1982

The Ruby Roadhouse, located in Olson Street in Ruby, Alaska, is a historic building that was listed on the U.S. National Register of Historic Places in 1982. It has also been known as US Commissioner's Office and as Army Signal Corps Station. The roadhouse has served as a courthouse, as a hotel, as government offices, as a health clinic, and as a military facility. The listing included one contributing building and one contributing structure.

It was formed from the 1913 house of Oscar Tackstrom that was used by the Army Signal Corps, plus a second building, Doc Frosts's medical clinic, built in 1911, that was later attached.

== See also ==
- National Register of Historic Places listings in Yukon–Koyukuk Census Area, Alaska
