= Central House (Central, Alaska) =

- U.S. National Register of Historic Places
- Alaska Heritage Resources Survey
- Location within Alaska
- Location: Mile 128 of Steese Highway, Central, Alaska
- Coordinates: 65°34′21″N 144°47′56″W
- Area: less than one acre
- Built: 1926
- Built by: Riley Erickson; John Stade
- Architectural style: log structure
- NRHP reference No.: 78003431
- AHRS No.: CIR-001

Significant dates
- Added to NRHP: July 31, 1978
- Designated AHRS: October 3, 1974

The Central House, also known as Erickson & Stade's, at Mile 128 on the Steese Highway in Central, Alaska, was a log structure built in 1926 by Riley Erickson and John Stade, replacing an 1894 log and sod structure that was burned in a 1925 fire. It served as a roadhouse restaurant and hotel, and was listed on the National Register of Historic Places in 1978.

Located on Crooked Creek, it was deemed significant for its historical role as a central focus for miners of other creeks that were Birch Creek tributaries and for serving travelers.

The building was about 52 by 20 feet (15.8 m × 6.1 m) in dimension, and the main logs are spruce joined by saddle corners. The roof was dirt-insulated and covered with galvanized metal roofing. In 1978, the lower three courses of logs of the walls were pretty well rotted, due to frequent creek flooding, and the building was decaying rapidly. The building has eventually collapsed and its remains are still visible along Steese Highway, shortly east of Crooked Creek bridge.

It was reached by a wagon road of the Alaska Road Commission in 1908. It was closed as a business in 1948 or 1949. In 1977, the Circle District Historical Society had plans to rebuild it and to use it as an historic museum and library, as well as a meeting place and community center.

Its preservation was hoped to remind locals, who had known miners 50 years before, "of the spirit, fortitude, and hope of an earlier time."

== See also ==
- National Register of Historic Places listings in Yukon–Koyukuk Census Area, Alaska
