= Slaven's Cabin =

- Frank Slaven Roadhouse
- U.S. National Register of Historic Places
- U.S. Historic district – Contributing property
- Alaska Heritage Resources Survey
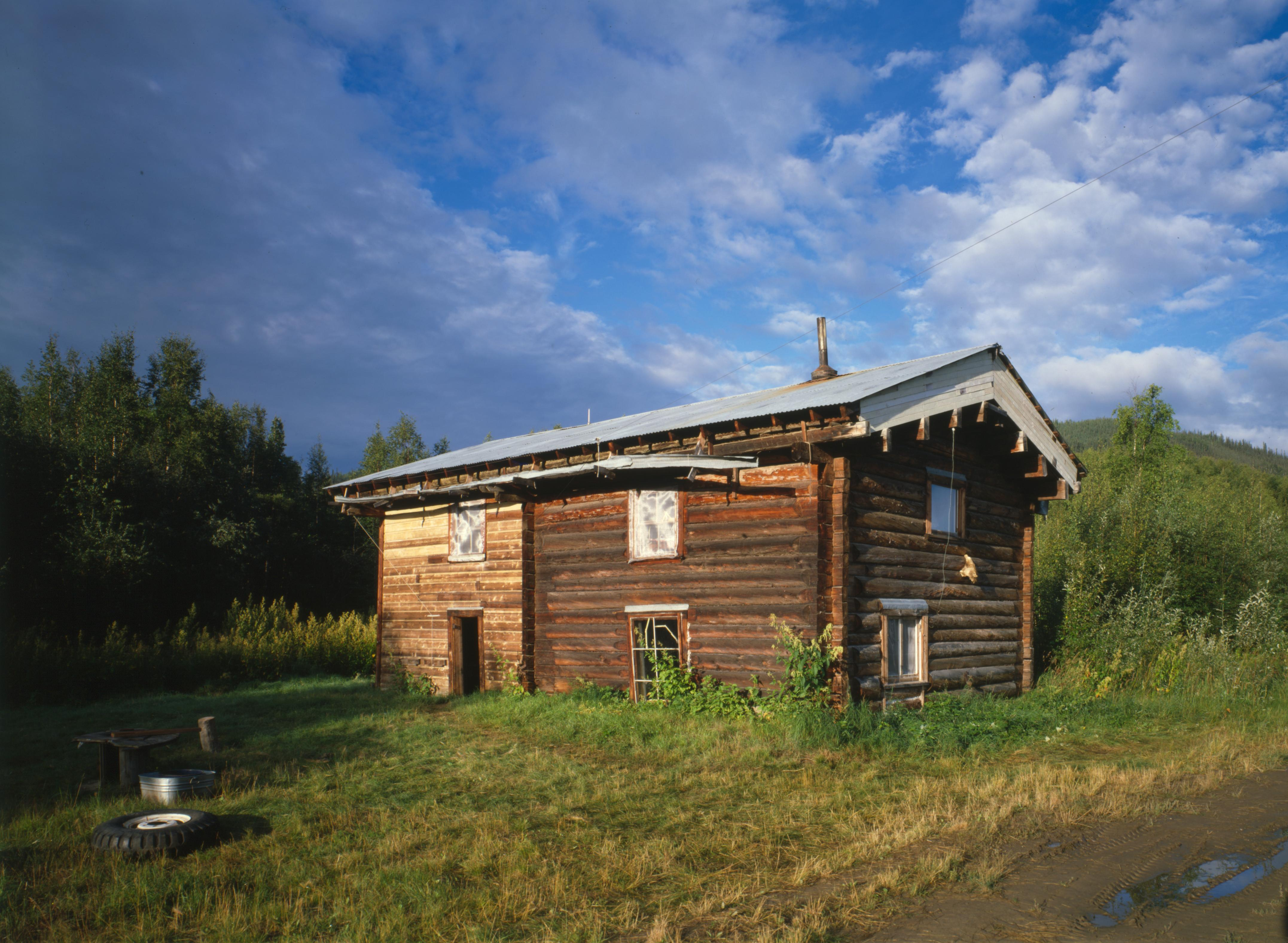
- Frank Slaven Roadhouse

- Location within Alaska
- Location: Mouth of Coal Creek, about 42 miles (68 km) southeast of Circle
- Nearest city: Circle, Alaska
- Coordinates: 65°21′02″N 143°07′22″W
- Built: 1930
- Part of: Coal Creek Historic Mining District (ID95000573)
- MPS: Yukon River Lifeways TR
- NRHP reference No.: 87001202
- AHRS No.: CHR-030

Significant dates
- Added to NRHP: July 20, 1987
- Designated CP: May 4, 1995

Slaven's Cabin, also called Slaven's Roadhouse and Frank Slaven Roadhouse, is a public-use facility in the Yukon-Charley Rivers National Preserve in Alaska. The cabin is located on the Yukon River, 42 miles (68 km) southeast of Circle, Alaska, and 138 miles (222 km) northeast of Fairbanks, Alaska. It is listed on the National Register of Historic Places.

Miner Frank Slaven began excavations at nearby Coal Creek in 1905 and built the roadhouse in 1932 with several friends. The roadhouse was used until the 1950s and was listed on the National Register of Historic Places in 1987. It also is included in the Coal Creek Historic Mining District, which is itself listed on the National Register of Historic Places. The cabin was restored in 1993 for use as a visitor contact area and public use facility. A separate public-use cabin also was built in 1993 at the location.

It is a two-story cabin built of 10-inch (250 mm) hewn spruce logs. The original 21-by-21-foot (6.4 m × 6.4 m) portion of the roadhouse, 19-foot (5.8 m) tall, was probably built with a 16-foot (4.9 m) overhang to the south. This portion was later enclosed.

The complex also is an official "dog drop" along the 1,000 mile Yukon Quest International Sled Dog Race route.

== See also ==
- National Register of Historic Places listings in Yukon-Charley Rivers National Preserve
- National Register of Historic Places listings in Yukon-Koyukuk Census Area, Alaska
