= Presentation of Our Lord Chapel =

Historic church in Alaska, United States

- U.S. National Register of Historic Places
- Alaska Heritage Resources Survey
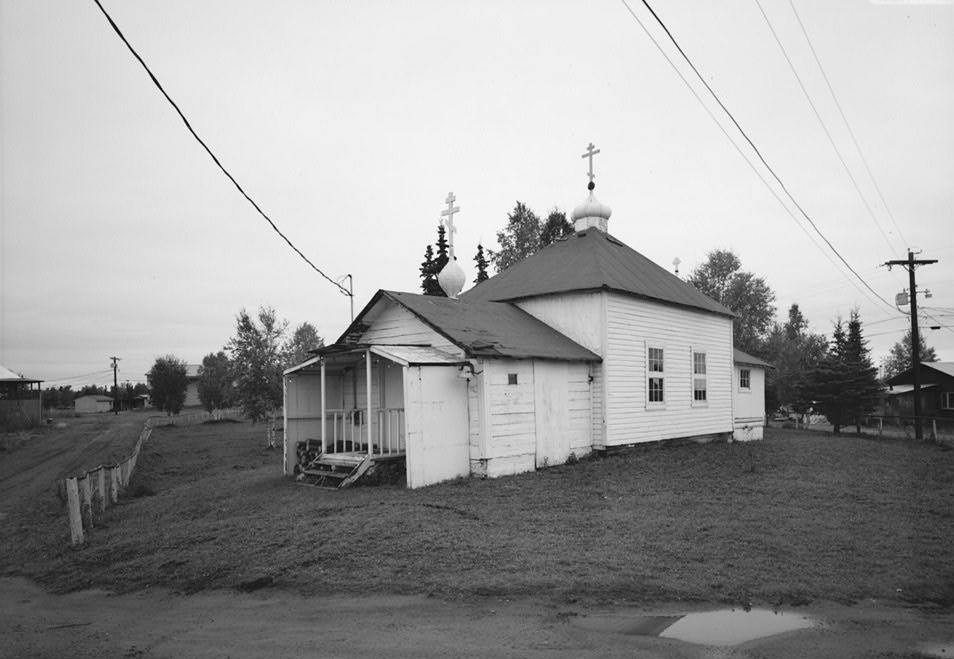

- Location within Alaska
- Location: Along Telida Trail, Nikolai, Alaska
- Coordinates: 63°00′45″N 154°22′35″W
- Area: less than one acre
- Built: 1929
- Built by: Multiple
- MPS: Russian Orthodox Church Buildings and Sites TR
- NRHP reference No.: 80004584
- AHRS No.: MCG-002

Significant dates
- Added to NRHP: June 6, 1980
- Designated AHRS: May 18, 1973

The Presentation of Our Lord Chapel is a historic chapel in Nikolai, Alaska. The church parish is believed to have been started long before 1915, in the Old Nikolai area, and moved because of flooding of the old area.

It was built in 1929 as a replacement to a log building that had been constructed on the site in 1915. One source asserts that in 1918 a different church was moved a few miles to this site in 1918; the 1929 rebuilding could incorporate that.

It was added to the National Register of Historic Places in 1980.

Now it is the St. Peter the Apostle Church under the Diocese of Alaska of the Orthodox Church in America.

== See also ==
- National Register of Historic Places listings in Yukon–Koyukuk Census Area, Alaska
