= Sourdough Inn =

Former historic building in Fort Yukon, Alaska

- U.S. National Register of Historic Places
- Alaska Heritage Resources Survey
- Location within Alaska
- Location: Northwest corner of First Avenue and Sled Road, Fort Yukon, Alaska
- Coordinates: 66°33′49″N 145°16′20″W
- Area: less than one acre
- Built: 1926
- NRHP reference No.: 97001585
- AHRS No.: FYU-006
- Added to NRHP: December 30, 1997

The Sourdough Inn, at First and Sled Streets in Fort Yukon, Alaska, was built in 1926, by moving a disused Army building from Fort Egbert near Eagle, Alaska. It was then modified and opened as a hotel. It has also been known as the New Sourdough Hotel and has served as a restaurant, a hotel, a post office and, briefly in the 1940s, as a school.

The Sourdough Inn was a three-story gable-roofed building approximately 24-by-48-foot (7.3 m × 14.6 m) in size, with a two-story addition in the back.

The building was listed on the National Register of Historic Places in 1997. Following its NRHP listing, it was the only frame building and the only hotel in the community of Fort Yukon.

The building no longer stands at its original location, which was in an area subjected to heavy floods. It is unclear whether it was destroyed or relocated elsewhere in Fort Yukon. (Note: Compare modern satellite imagery with Old Mission House NRHP form containing a sketch map, this 1950 aerial image and this 1972 aerial image where the building is visible)

== See also ==
- National Register of Historic Places listings in Yukon–Koyukuk Census Area, Alaska
