= George McGregor Cabin =

Historic house in Alaska, United States

- U.S. National Register of Historic Places
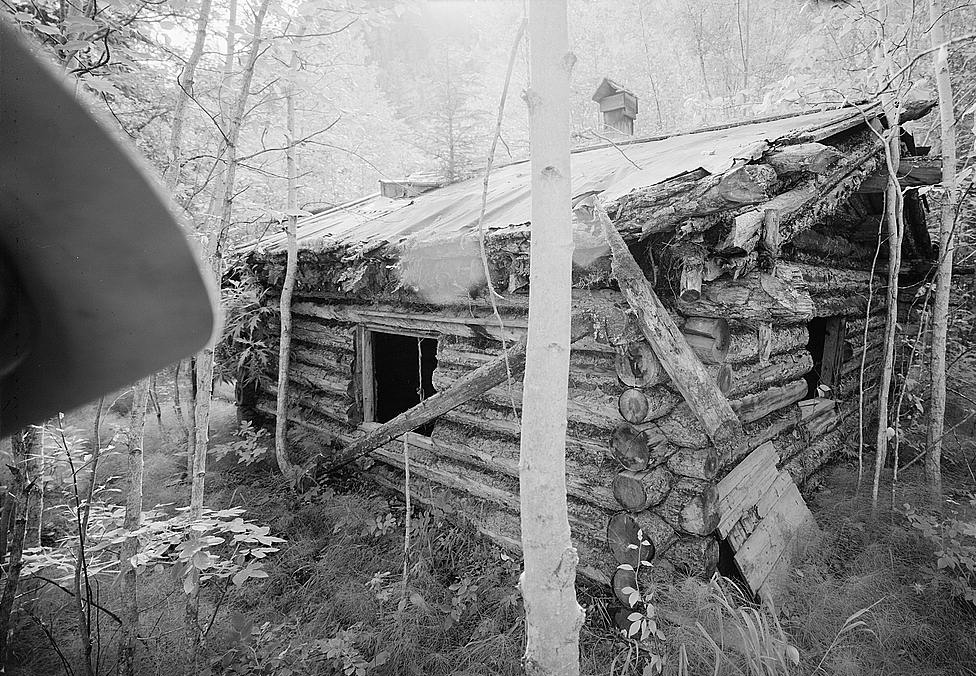

- Location within Alaska
- Location: About 2 miles (3.2 km) west of Coal Creek
- Nearest city: Eagle, Alaska
- Coordinates: 65°21′11″N 143°11′48″W
- Area: 1.5 acres (0.61 ha)
- Built: 1938
- Built by: George McGregor
- Architectural style: Cabin
- MPS: Yukon River Lifeways TR
- NRHP reference No.: 87001199
- Added to NRHP: July 21, 1987

The George McGregor Cabin on the Yukon River, about two miles downstream from Coal Creek, in the Yukon-Charley Rivers National Preserve of Alaska is a historic Log cabin built in 1938 that was listed on the U.S. National Register of Historic Places in 1987.

George McGregor was a successful gold miner, who staked multiple gold claims including the "discovery claim" on Mineral Creek, a tributary of Woodchopper Creek, which he worked for about 10 years and then sold these in the mid-1930s. Then he switched to trapping for furs; in 1938 he built this cabin and developed a trapline. As the trapline would be operated in the winter, by dogsled visits, he fished in the summer for food for his dogs using a fishwheel. The cabin is a one-roomed saddle-notched log cabin which is representative of what trappers used.

== See also ==
- National Register of Historic Places listings in Yukon-Charley Rivers National Preserve
- National Register of Historic Places listings in Yukon–Koyukuk Census Area, Alaska
