= Yukon Flats School District =

School district in Alaska, United States

Coordinates: 66.8691°N 145.3113°W

Address
- 123 Hill Street Fort Yukon, Alaska, 99740; United States

District information
- Grades: Pre-K–12
- Superintendent: Lance Bowie
- Schools: 6
- NCES District ID: 0200775

Students and staff
- Students: 175
- Teachers: 20.0
- Staff: 29.71
- Student–teacher ratio: 8.75

Other information
- Website: www.yfsd.org

Yukon Flats School District (YFSD) is a school district headquartered in Fort Yukon, Alaska.

== Schools ==
They are:

- Arctic Village School (Arctic Village)
- Cruikshank School (Beaver)
- John Fredson School (Venetie)
- Fort Yukon School (Fort Yukon)
- Tsuk Taih School (Chalkyitsik)
- Circle School (Circle)

Closed schools:

- Birch Creek
- Central

== School Board ==
The Yukon Flats School Board is governed by a seven-member school board composed of:

Yukon Flats School Board
Position	Name	Section and Seat	Term Expires
President	Laurie Thomas	II-E	October 2022
Vice President	David Bridges	II-C	October 2020
Board Member	Rhonda Pitka	I-A	October 2022
Board Member	Eugenia Grammer	I-B	October 2021
Board Member	Melinda Peter	II-D	October 2021
Board Member	Tonya L. Carroll	III-F	October 2021
Board Member	Tamara Henry	III-G	October 2020
