= Old Mission House =

Historic church in Alaska, United States

- U.S. National Register of Historic Places
- Alaska Heritage Resources Survey
- Location within Alaska
- Location: Along Winter Trail, Fort Yukon, Alaska
- Coordinates: 66°33′57″N 145°16′36″W
- Area: 5 acres (2.0 ha)
- Built: 1925
- Built by: Multiple
- NRHP reference No.: 78000539
- AHRS No.: FYU-003

Significant dates
- Added to NRHP: November 7, 1978
- Designated AHRS: September 30, 1977

The Old Mission House was a historic Episcopal church mission house in Fort Yukon, Alaska. It was constructed in 1925 as part of a Native American mission. It was the third mission house built on the site, nearly duplicating one built in 1914 and destroyed by fire. The house is a 2 1/2-story log structure in an L shape, with interior rooms constructed by frame construction. The building was the center of the religious mission, which provided educational and health services to the local Native population. This building was used as a school, providing boarding space for students from distant areas. In 1957 the building was adapted for use as the medical clinic after the previous clinic building was closed and later torn down.

The building was added to the National Register of Historic Places in 1978.

The building is not standing anymore at its original location. It was located in an area subjected to heavy floods and it is unclear whether it has been destroyed or relocated elsewhere in Fort Yukon. (Note: Compare modern satellite imagery, where foundations and the house walkway seem still visible, with NRHP form, this 1950 aerial image and this 1972 aerial image where the house is still standing)

== See also ==
- National Register of Historic Places listings in Yukon–Koyukuk Census Area, Alaska
