= Stevens Village Airport =

Airport in Alaska, United States of America

- IATA: SVS; ICAO: none; FAA LID: SVS

Summary
- Airport type: Public
- Owner: Alaska DOT&PF - Northern Region
- Serves: Stevens Village, Alaska
- Elevation AMSL: 329 ft / 100 m
- Coordinates: 66°01′01″N 149°03′16″W

Map
- Location of airport in Alaska

Runways
Direction	Length		Surface
Direction	ft	m	Surface
5/23	4,000	1,219	Gravel

Statistics (2005)
- Aircraft operations: 750
- Source: Federal Aviation Administration

Stevens Village Airport (IATA: SVS, FAA LID: SVS) is a state-owned public-use airport serving Stevens Village, in the Yukon-Koyukuk Census Area of the U.S. state of Alaska.

== Facilities and aircraft ==
Stevens Village Airport has one runway designated 5/23 with a gravel surface measuring 4,000 by 75 ft (1,219 x 23 m). For the 12-month period ending December 31, 2005, the airport had 750 aircraft operations, an average of 62 per month: 67% general aviation and 33% air taxi.

The original Stevens Village Airport was located at 66°00.54′N 149°05.75′W and had a runway designated 7/25 which measured 2,120 by 60 feet.

== Airlines and destinations ==
Airlines	Destinations
Warbelow's Air Ventures	Fairbanks

== See also ==
- List of airports in Alaska
