= Christ Church Mission =

Historic church in Alaska, United States

- U.S. National Register of Historic Places
- Alaska Heritage Resources Survey
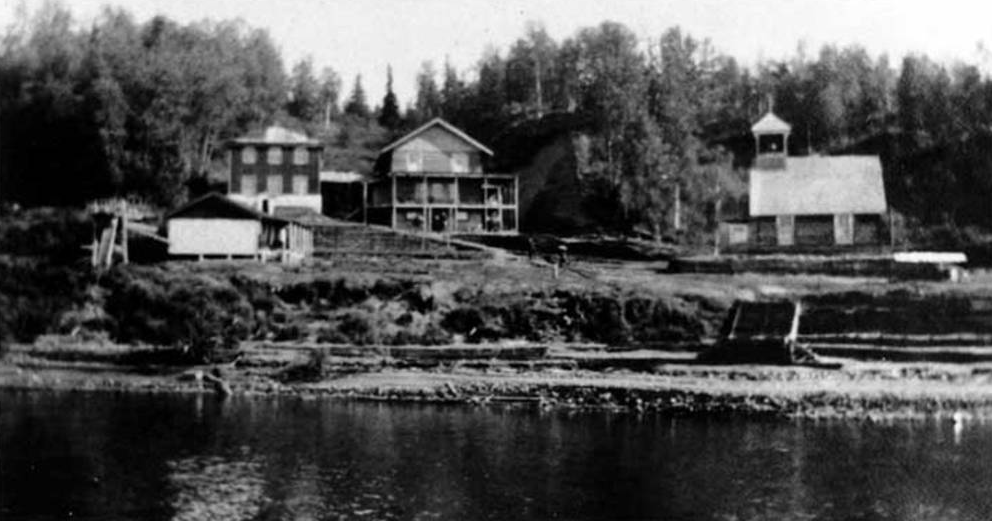
- The mission in 1921; it has since undergone some alteration

- Location within Alaska
- Location: Corner of Main Road and River Road, Anvik, Alaska
- Coordinates: 62°39′21″N 160°12′13″W
- Area: 2 acres (0.81 ha)
- Built: 1892
- Built by: Rev. John W. Chapman
- NRHP reference No.: 80004572
- AHRS No.: XHC-016

Significant dates
- Added to NRHP: May 8, 1980
- Designated AHRS: July 5, 1978

Christ Church Mission, also known as the Anvik Mission, is a historic Episcopal church mission in Anvik, Alaska. It is located near the former confluence of the Anvik and Yukon Rivers, about 2 miles (3.2 km) below the present confluence. There are four buildings that survive from what was once a larger complex. The largest is the main mission building, is a 36-by-72-foot (11 m × 22 m) structure built in 1932. The oldest building is the church, which was built in 1892, and was moved to the present site when river erosion threatened the previous one.

The mission site was added to the National Register of Historic Places in 1980.

== See also ==
- National Register of Historic Places listings in Yukon–Koyukuk Census Area, Alaska
