= Tolovana Roadhouse =

- U.S. National Register of Historic Places
- Alaska Heritage Resources Survey
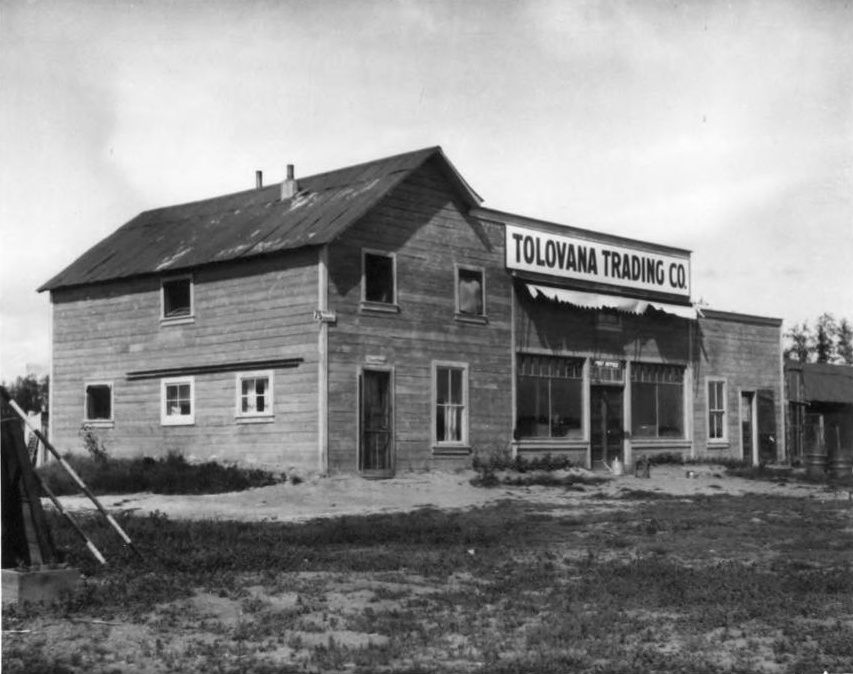

- Location within Alaska
- Location: At the confluence of Tanana and Tolovana Rivers, about 29 miles (47 km) northwest of Nenana, Alaska
- Nearest city: Nenana, Alaska
- Coordinates: 64°51′13″N 149°49′29″W
- Area: 5 acres (2.0 ha)
- Built: 1924
- Built by: Henry Martin; Ida Martin
- Architectural style: Pioneer log construction
- NRHP reference No.: 88000402
- AHRS No.: FAI-241
- Added to NRHP: October 7, 1988

The Tolovana Roadhouse is a historic roadhouse in the Yukon-Koyukuk borough of Alaska. It is located near the confluence of the Tanana and Tolovana Rivers near Nenana, Alaska. Four buildings survive from what was once a more extensive complex of buildings. The extant roadhouse was built in 1924, after both a 1901 roadhouse and 1921 trading post were destroyed by fire. The other three buildings that were in good condition in 1988 included a storage building, outhouse, and power plant; seven other structures were then deemed to be in a state of collapse, while three other documented buildings had been washed away by the erosive force of the Tanana River.

The roadhouse was listed on the National Register of Historic Places in 1988.

== See also ==
- National Register of Historic Places listings in Yukon–Koyukuk Census Area, Alaska
