= Mission Church (Arctic Village, Alaska) =

Historic church in Alaska, United States

- U.S. National Register of Historic Places
- Alaska Heritage Resources Survey
- Location within Alaska
- Location: Main Street, Arctic Village, Alaska
- Coordinates: 68°07′44″N 145°32′18″W
- Area: less than one acre
- Built: 1917
- Built by: Rev. Albert E. Tritt
- Architectural style: Log & sod construction
- NRHP reference No.: 77001578
- AHRS No.: ARC-056

Significant dates
- Added to NRHP: April 11, 1977
- Designated AHRS: February 25, 1976

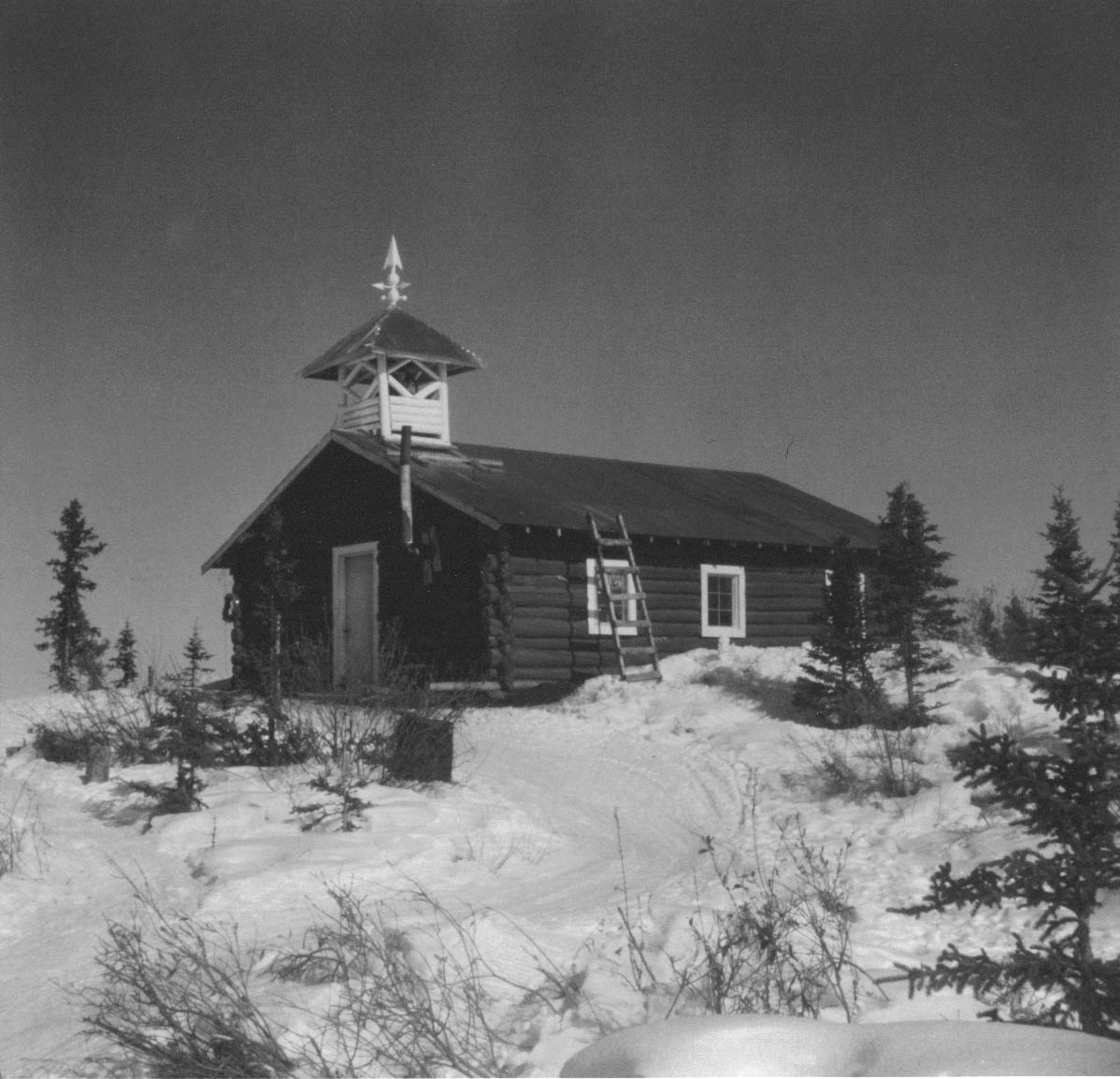
Episcopal Church at Arctic Village.jpg

The Mission Church is a historic Episcopal log church building on the eastern fork of the Chandalar River in Arctic Village, Alaska, inside the Arctic National Wildlife Refuge. Known also as Old Missionary Church and as Old Log Church, it was built in 1917. It was one of numerous mission churches established in Alaska by the Episcopal Church in the early 20th century.

The building is significant as a mission church and for association with Reverend Albert E. Tritt. A native of Arctic Village, Tritt was converted to Christianity by gospel preaching of Episcopal missionaries at Fort Yukon, about 100 miles (160 km) to the south. He returned with a Takudh-language Bible and sought to bring others into the Episcopal church. He became a deacon of the Episcopal Church in 1925. He helped with the building of a newer church in the village in 1939.

The church was added to the National Register of Historic Places in 1977.

== See also ==
- National Register of Historic Places listings in Yukon–Koyukuk Census Area, Alaska
