= Bettles Lodge =

- U.S. National Register of Historic Places
- Alaska Heritage Resources Survey
- Location within Alaska
- Location: 1 Airline Drive, Bettles Field, Bettles, Alaska
- Coordinates: 66°55′05″N 151°31′06″W
- Area: less than one acre
- Built: 1951
- Built by: Killen, Warren; Evans, Wilfred
- NRHP reference No.: 97000401
- AHRS No.: BET-100
- Added to NRHP: May 8, 1997

Bettles Lodge, located a few miles from Bettles, Alaska on the south bank of the Koyukuk River in the Brooks Range, was built in 1951 by Warren Killen and Wilfred Evans. It has served as a hotel and restaurant and was listed on the National Register of Historic Places in 1997. The listing included two contributing buildings: a first lodge built in 1948 and a second built in 1951. The lodge buildings are significant because it is the oldest (and first) in the community, and it served as an air transportation hub for the northern interior area of Alaska.

It is about 25 miles (40 km) north of the Arctic Circle, just south of the Brooks Range.

== See also ==
- National Register of Historic Places listings in Yukon–Koyukuk Census Area, Alaska
