= Beaver, Alaska =

Beaver Ts'aahudaaneekk'onh Denh
- CDP
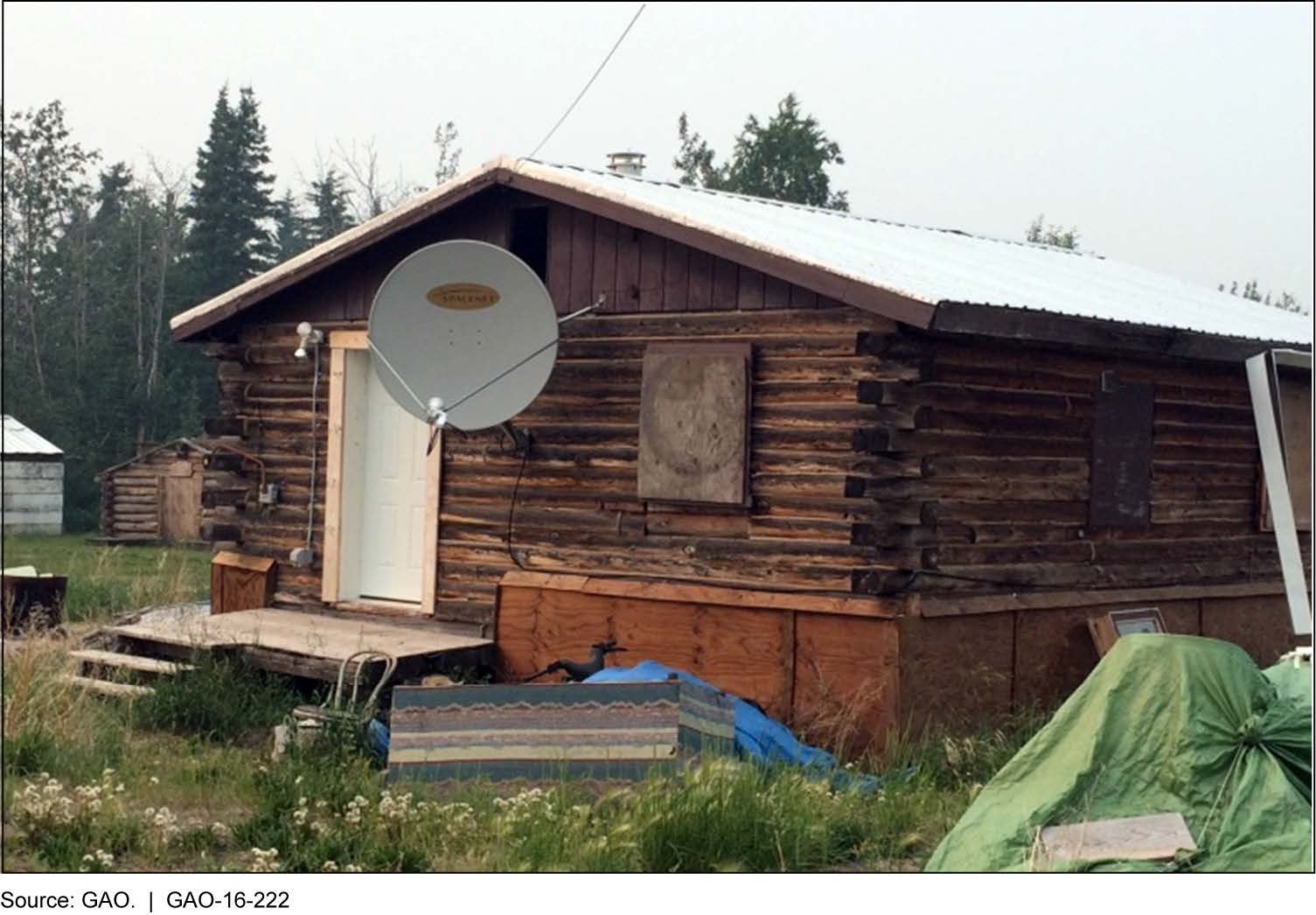
- A house in Beaver, February 2016

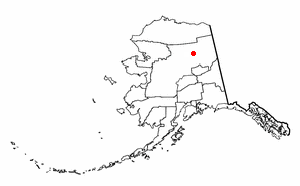
- Location of Beaver, Alaska
- Coordinates: 66°21′35″N 147°23′51″W
- Country: United States
- State: Alaska
- Census Area: Yukon-Koyukuk

Government
  - State senator: Click Bishop (R)
  - State rep.: Mike Cronk (R)

Area
  - Total: 21.05 sq mi (54.51 km^{2})
  - Land: 20.52 sq mi (53.14 km^{2})
  - Water: 0.53 sq mi (1.36 km^{2})

Population (2020)
  - Total: 48
  - Density: 2.3/sq mi (0.9/km^{2})
- Time zone: UTC-9 (Alaska (AKST))
  - Summer (DST): UTC-8 (AKDT)
- ZIP code: 99724
- Area code: 907
- FIPS code: 02-05750

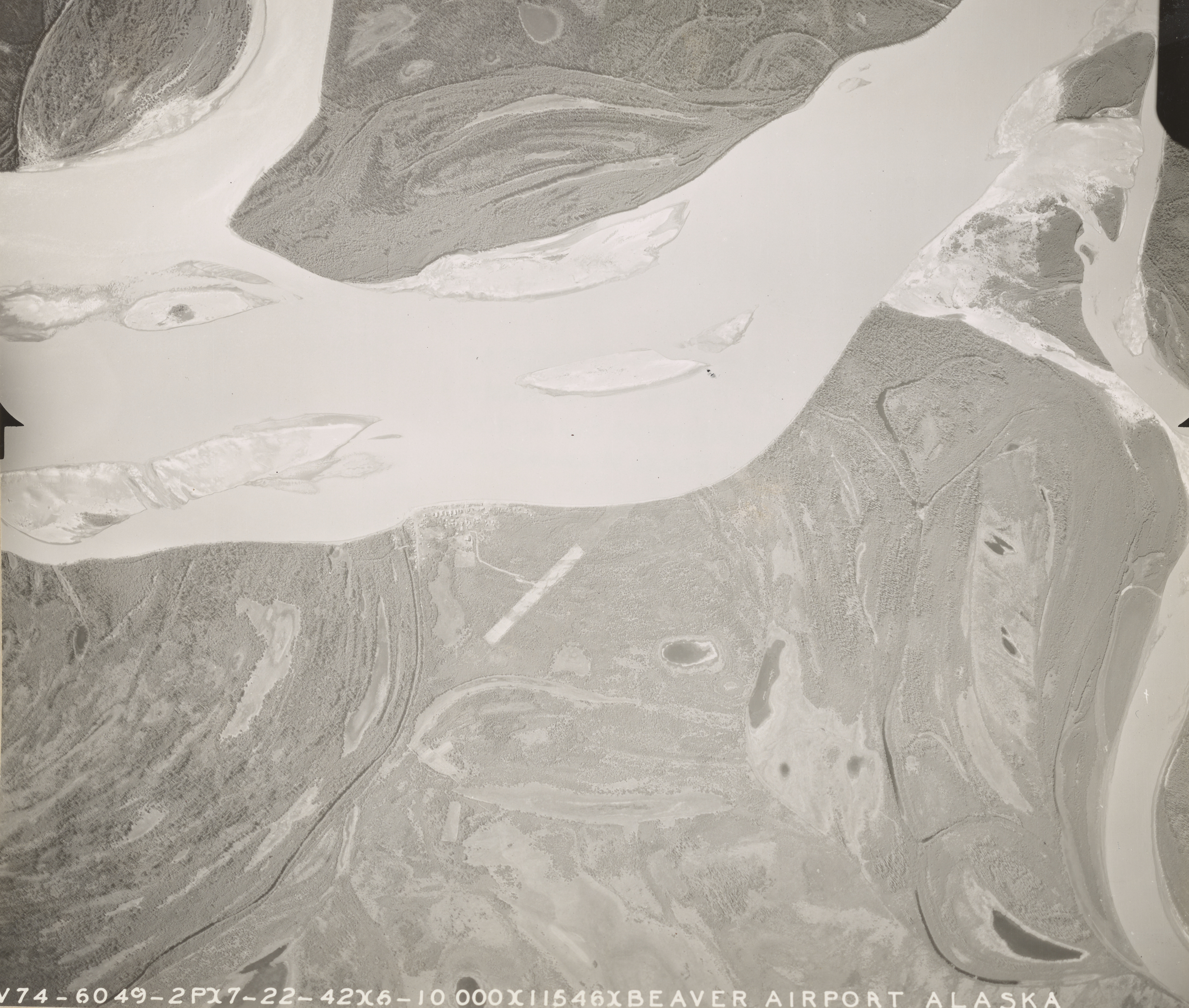
Beaver airstrip, 1944

Beaver (Ts'aahudaaneekk'onh Denh in Koyukon) is a census-designated place (CDP) in Yukon-Koyukuk Census Area, Alaska, United States. At the time of the 2010 census the population was 84, unchanged from 2000, however the 2020 census reported a total population of 48.

== Geography ==
Beaver is located at 66°21′35″N 147°23′51″W.

According to the United States Census Bureau, the CDP has a total area of 21.6 square miles (56 km^{2}), of which, 20.5 square miles (53 km^{2}) of it is land and 1.1 square miles (2.8 km^{2}) of it (5.05%) is water.

== Demographics ==
Historical population
Census	Pop.	Note	%±
1930	103		—
1940	88		−14.6%
1950	101		14.8%
1960	101		0.0%
1970	101		0.0%
1980	66		−34.7%
1990	103		56.1%
2000	84		−18.4%
2010	84		0.0%
2020	48		−42.9%
U.S. Decennial Census

Beaver first appeared on the 1930 U.S. Census as an unincorporated village. It is unusual for having had just three different population figures on 7 out of 9 censuses (103 in 1930 & 1990; 101 in 1950-70 & 84 in 2000–10) and an identical (unchanged) population on 5 different censuses (101 in 1950, 1960 & 1970 and 84 in 2000 and 2010). Beaver became a census-designated place (CDP) in 1980.

=== 2020 Census ===
As of the 2020 Census, there were a reported 48 inhabitants across 41 households and 57 housing units within the CDP. The population density was 2.34 inhabitants per square mile (0.90 inhabitants/km^{2}). The racial makeup was 95.83% Native American, 2.08% White, and 2.08% Hispanic or Latino.

The median household income was $36,964 and the median incomes for families was $46,250, both of which remained far below the Alaska median household income of $88,121. The poverty rate was 26.2%, including 61.1% of people under 18 years old and 24.4% of those aged 18 to 64 years.

The employment rate was 72.7%, with 70.8% of workers being in local, state, or federal employees, 22.9% being employees of private companies, and 6.3% being employed by private not-for-profits. As for transportation, 100% of workers 16 years old and over walked to work, with the average commute time being 5.6 minutes.

=== 2000 Census ===
As of the census of 2000, there were 84 people, 31 households, and 19 families residing in the CDP. The population density was 4.1 inhabitants per square mile (1.6/km^{2}). There were 54 housing units at an average density of 2.6 units per square mile (1.0 units/km^{2}). The racial makeup of the CDP was 4.76% White, 85.71% Native American, and 9.52% from two or more races.

There were 31 households, out of which 41.9% had children under the age of 18 living with them, 12.9% were married couples living together, 32.3% had a female householder with no husband present, and 38.7% were non-families. 29.0% of all households were made up of individuals, and 6.5% had someone living alone who was 65 years of age or older. The average household size was 2.71 and the average family size was 3.42.

In the CDP, the population was spread out, with 40.5% under the age of 18, 4.8% from 18 to 24, 32.1% from 25 to 44, 15.5% from 45 to 64, and 7.1% who were 65 years of age or older. The median age was 29 years. For every 100 females, there were 154.5 males. For every 100 females age 18 and over, there were 163.2 males.

The median income for a household in the CDP was $28,750, and the median income for a family was $29,792. Males had a median income of $26,667 versus $16,875 for females. The per capita income for the CDP was $8,441. There were no families and 11.1% of the population living below the poverty line, including no under eighteens and none of those over 64.

== Education ==
Yukon Flats School District operates the Cruikshank School.

== Health ==
Sale, importation and possession of alcohol are banned in the village.

== Notable Legal Case ==
Beaver has figured in an Eighth Amendment case pending before the United States Supreme Court. Bush pilot Ken Jouppi was scheduled to fly a passenger from Fairbanks to Beaver, when his plane was searched by Alaska State Troopers before takeoff. In their search, the troopers discovered a six-pack of beer that the passenger was carrying to her husband in Beaver. Because of Beaver's ban on alcohol importations, Jouppi, the passenger, and Jouppi's company were charged with knowingly importing alcohol to a "dry" village. Jouppi was convicted and sentenced to three days in prison and a $1,500 fine.

Alaska separately sought forfeiture of Jouppi's airplane, valued at $95,000. Following an appeal by Jouppi, the Alaska Supreme Court held that the forfeiture was not in violation of the United States Constitution's Excessive Fines Clause.

On July 20, 2026, the United States Supreme Court agreed to hear Jouppi's appeal, Jouppi v. Alaska, on the question of whether courts should weigh the gravity of a defendant's conduct in assessing whether a fine is unconstitutionally excessive. Jouppi is represented by the Institute for Justice (IJ).

The case will be adjudicated in the 2026-2027 term of the United States Supreme Court, and arguments are expected in December 2026.

== See also ==
- List of census-designated places in Alaska
