= Stevens Village, Alaska =

Stevens Village Denyeet
- CDP
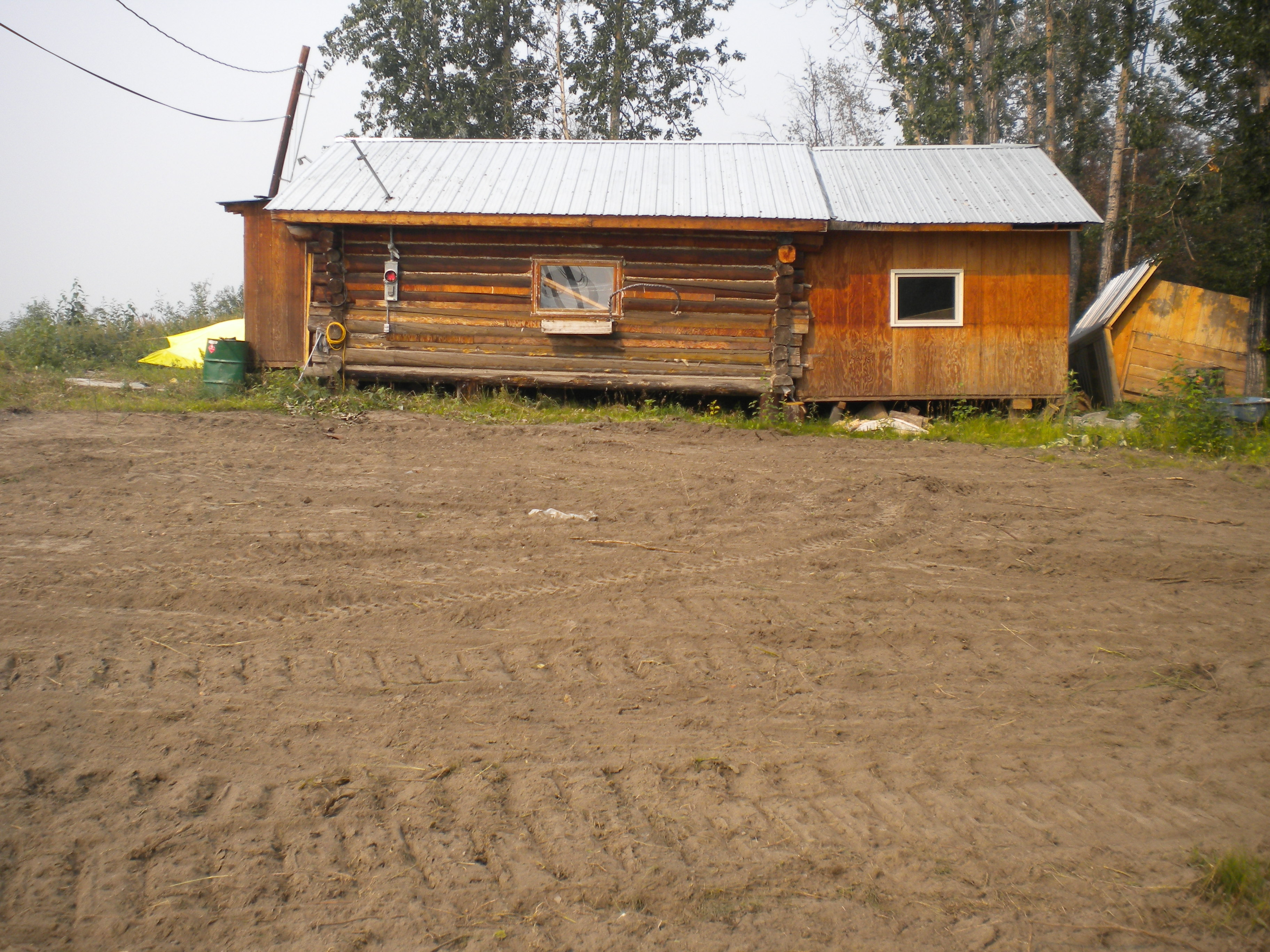
- Home in Stevens Village, 2009

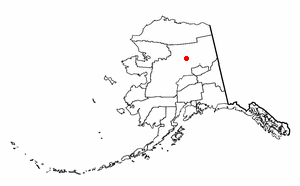
- Location of Stevens Village, Alaska
- Coordinates: 66°0′19″N 149°6′11″W
- Country: United States
- State: Alaska
- Census Area: Yukon-Koyukuk

Government
  - State senator: Click Bishop (R)
  - State rep.: Mike Cronk (R)

Area
  - Total: 13.29 sq mi (34.43 km^{2})
  - Land: 11.65 sq mi (30.17 km^{2})
  - Water: 1.64 sq mi (4.25 km^{2})

Population (2020)
  - Total: 37
  - Density: 3.2/sq mi (1.23/km^{2})
- Time zone: UTC-9 (Alaska (AKST))
  - Summer (DST): UTC-8 (AKDT)
- ZIP code: 99774
- Area code: 907
- FIPS code: 02-73290

Stevens Village (Denyeet in Koyukon) is a census-designated place (CDP) in Yukon-Koyukuk Census Area, Alaska, United States. The population was 37 at the 2020 census, down from 78 in the 2010 census.

The village is named for its first chief, Skidedlestalk “Old Steven” Stevens (1850-d. 1912~1920).

== Geography ==
Stevens Village is located at 66°0′19″N 149°6′11″W (66.005296, -149.103032), in the middle of the Yukon Flats.

According to the United States Census Bureau, the CDP has a total area of 11.0 square miles (28 km^{2}), of which, 10.4 square miles (27 km^{2}) of it is land and 0.6 square miles (1.6 km^{2}) of it (5.47%) is water.

== Demographics ==
Historical population
Census	Pop.	Note	%±
1910	100		—
1920	103		3.0%
1930	48		−53.4%
1940	54		12.5%
1950	84		55.6%
1960	102		21.4%
1970	74		−27.5%
1980	96		29.7%
1990	102		6.3%
2000	87		−14.7%
2010	78		−10.3%
2020	37		−52.6%
U.S. Decennial Census

Stevens Village originally had been “Stevens Camp,” and was so listed in the 1900 Census. It next appeared on the 1910 U.S. Census as the unincorporated village of Stevens. It returned again in 1920, and in 1930, it returned as "Stephens." From 1940–60, it returned again as "Stevens." In 1970, and in every successive census, it has returned as Stevens Village. It was made a census-designated place (CDP) in 1980.

As of the census of 2000, there were 87 people, 35 households, and 15 families residing in the CDP. The population density was 8.4 inhabitants per square mile (3.2/km^{2}). There were 43 housing units at an average density of 4.1 per square mile (1.6/km^{2}). The racial makeup of the CDP was 3.45% White, 95.40% Native American, 1.15% from other races. 6.90% of the population were Hispanic or Latino of any race.

There were 35 households, out of which 28.6% had children under the age of 18 living with them, 2.9% were married couples living together, 31.4% had a female householder with no husband present, and 54.3% were non-families. 45.7% of all households were made up of individuals, and 11.4% had someone living alone who was 65 years of age or older. The average household size was 2.49 and the average family size was 3.63.

In the CDP, the age distribution of the population shows 29.9% under the age of 18, 8.0% from 18 to 24, 31.0% from 25 to 44, 24.1% from 45 to 64, and 6.9% who were 65 years of age or older. The median age was 35 years. For every 100 females, there were 190.0 males. For every 100 females age 18 and over, there were 190.5 males.

The median income for a household in the CDP was $12,500, and the median income for a family was $11,563. Males had a median income of $11,250 versus $0 for females. The per capita income for the CDP was $7,113. There were 60.0% of families and 61.2% of the population living below the poverty line, including 70.8% of under eighteens and 25.0% of those over 64.
