= Central, Alaska =

- CDP
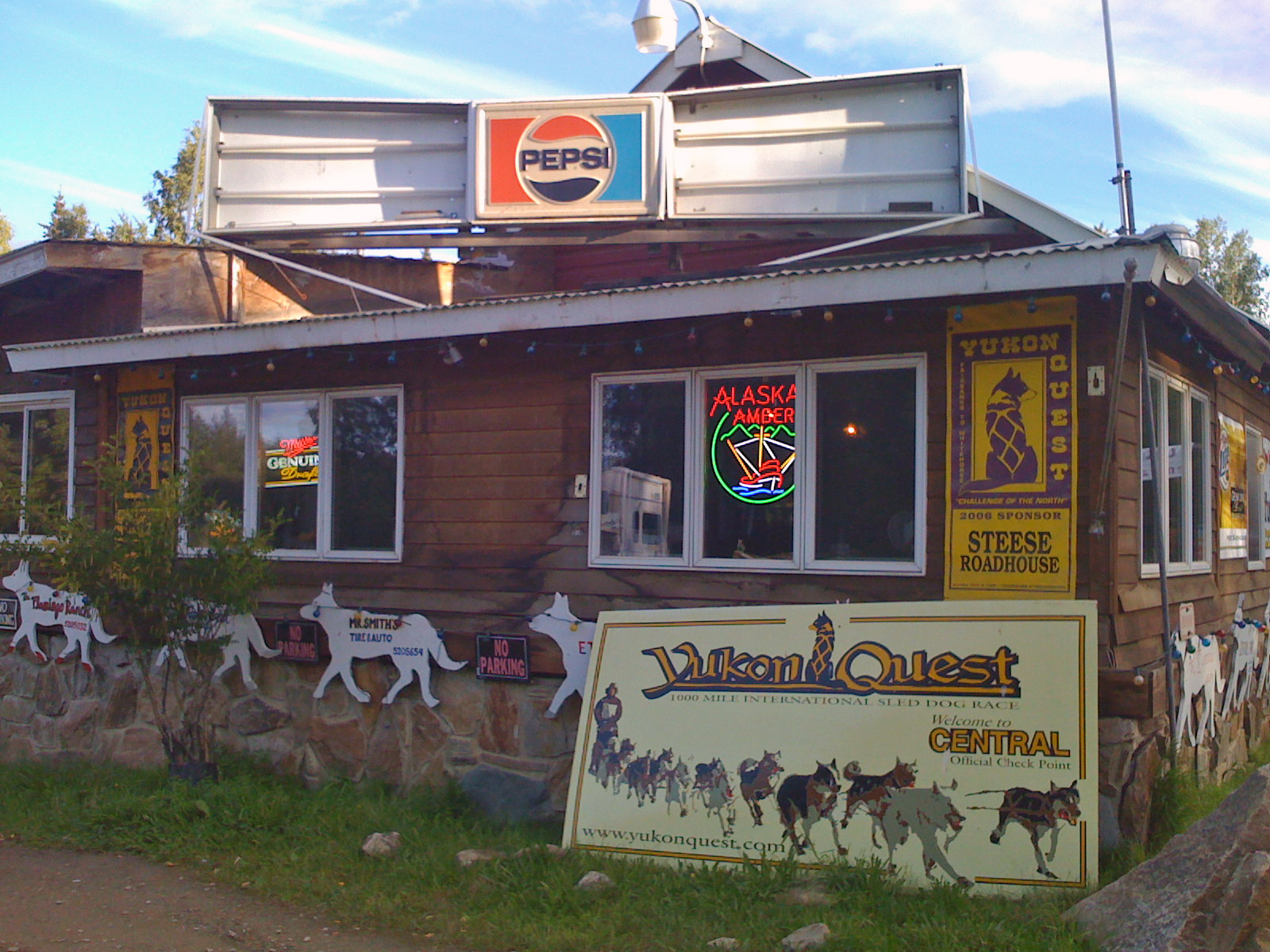
- The Steese Roadhouse is a bar, general store, and gas station in Central that serves as a midway point for the Yukon Quest.

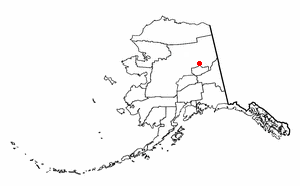
- Location of Central, Alaska
- Coordinates: 65°32′0″N 144°41′44″W
- Country: United States
- State: Alaska
- Census Area: Yukon-Koyukuk

Government
  - State senator: Click Bishop (R)
  - State rep.: Mike Cronk (R)

Area
  - Total: 249.39 sq mi (645.91 km^{2})
  - Land: 247.92 sq mi (642.11 km^{2})
  - Water: 1.46 sq mi (3.79 km^{2})
- Elevation: 942 ft (287 m)

Population (2020)
  - Total: 66
  - Density: 0.26/sq mi (0.1/km^{2})
- Time zone: UTC-9 (Alaska (AKST))
  - Summer (DST): UTC-8 (AKDT)
- ZIP code: 99730
- Area code: 907
- FIPS code: 02-11690
- GNIS feature ID: 1400106

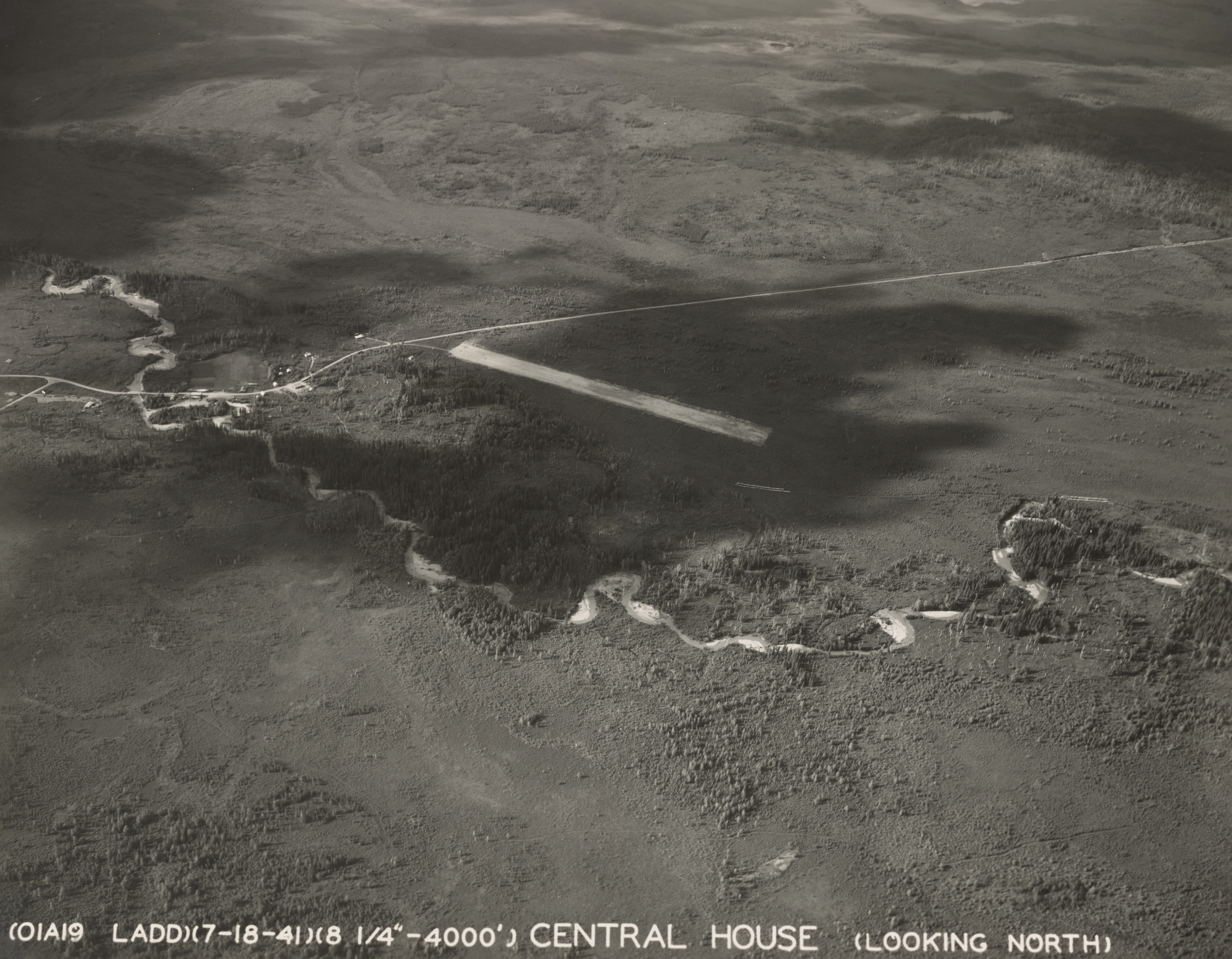
View of Central, 1941

Central is a census-designated place (CDP) in Yukon-Koyukuk Census Area, Alaska, United States. At the 2020 census the population was 66, down from 96 in 2010. Every February, Central hosts a checkpoint for the long-distance Yukon Quest sled dog race.

== Geography ==
Central is located at 65°32′0″N 144°41′44″W (65.533461, -144.695650). The elevation is 942 feet. The Steese Highway (Alaska Route 6) does pass through Central.

According to the United States Census Bureau, the CDP has a total area of 249.4 square miles (646 km^{2}), of which, 247.9 square miles (642 km^{2}) of it is land and 1.5 square miles (3.9 km^{2}) of it (0.60%) is water.

== Climate ==
Central has a continental subarctic climate (Köppen Dfc).

Climate data for Central #2, Alaska, 1991–2020 normals, 1905–2011 extremes: 920ft (280m)
Month	Jan	Feb	Mar	Apr	May	Jun	Jul	Aug	Sep	Oct	Nov	Dec	Year
Record high °F (°C)	48 (9)	50 (10)	53 (12)	69 (21)	85 (29)	92 (33)	91 (33)	90 (32)	80 (27)	68 (20)	50 (10)	51 (11)	92 (33)
Mean maximum °F (°C)	23.3 (−4.8)	32.1 (0.1)	38.5 (3.6)	58.1 (14.5)	76.3 (24.6)	84.0 (28.9)	86.3 (30.2)	82.3 (27.9)	68.8 (20.4)	46.7 (8.2)	26.9 (−2.8)	20.3 (−6.5)	86.4 (30.2)
Mean daily maximum °F (°C)	−7.4 (−21.9)	3.2 (−16.0)	16.5 (−8.6)	41.8 (5.4)	59.9 (15.5)	72.3 (22.4)	73.2 (22.9)	66.3 (19.1)	53.0 (11.7)	28.6 (−1.9)	4.9 (−15.1)	−1.4 (−18.6)	34.2 (1.2)
Daily mean °F (°C)	−15.7 (−26.5)	−7.8 (−22.1)	1.1 (−17.2)	26.7 (−2.9)	47.0 (8.3)	59.3 (15.2)	61.0 (16.1)	54.2 (12.3)	41.5 (5.3)	20.4 (−6.4)	−2.8 (−19.3)	−9.1 (−22.8)	23.0 (−5.0)
Mean daily minimum °F (°C)	−24.0 (−31.1)	−18.8 (−28.2)	−14.2 (−25.7)	11.6 (−11.3)	34.2 (1.2)	46.4 (8.0)	48.7 (9.3)	42.1 (5.6)	30.0 (−1.1)	12.1 (−11.1)	−10.4 (−23.6)	−16.7 (−27.1)	11.8 (−11.3)
Mean minimum °F (°C)	−49.3 (−45.2)	−42.6 (−41.4)	−33.4 (−36.3)	−14.5 (−25.8)	19.3 (−7.1)	32.7 (0.4)	36.6 (2.6)	27.5 (−2.5)	14.5 (−9.7)	−11.8 (−24.3)	−29.8 (−34.3)	−40.6 (−40.3)	−51.0 (−46.1)
Record low °F (°C)	−69 (−56)	−62 (−52)	−50 (−46)	−30 (−34)	−1 (−18)	19 (−7)	18 (−8)	13 (−11)	−2 (−19)	−38 (−39)	−55 (−48)	−61 (−52)	−69 (−56)
Average precipitation inches (mm)	0.53 (13)	0.34 (8.6)	0.27 (6.9)	0.32 (8.1)	0.74 (19)	1.84 (47)	2.57 (65)	1.76 (45)	1.30 (33)	0.87 (22)	0.71 (18)	0.90 (23)	12.15 (308.6)
Average snowfall inches (cm)	8.0 (20)	5.6 (14)	5.2 (13)	3.1 (7.9)	0.6 (1.5)	0.0 (0.0)	0.0 (0.0)	0.0 (0.0)	2.3 (5.8)	11.9 (30)	10.1 (26)	8.6 (22)	55.4 (140.2)
Source 1: NOAA (1981-2010 precipitation)
Source 2: XMACIS2 (records, 1996-2011 monthly max/mins & snowfall)

== Demographics ==
Historical population
Census	Pop.	Note	%±
1950	41		—
1960	28		−31.7%
1970	26		−7.1%
1980	36		38.5%
1990	52		44.4%
2000	134		157.7%
2010	96		−28.4%
2020	66		−31.2%
U.S. Decennial Census

Central first appeared on the 1950 U.S. Census as an unincorporated village. It was made a census-designated place (CDP) in 1980.

As of the census of 2000, there were 134 people, 67 households, and 33 families residing in the CDP. The population density was 0.5 inhabitants per square mile (0.19/km^{2}). There were 169 housing units at an average density of 0.7 per square mile (0.27/km^{2}). The racial makeup of the CDP was 84.33% White, 7.46% Native American, 0.75% Asian, 2.99% from other races, and 4.48% from two or more races. 0.75% of the population were Hispanic or Latino of any race.

There were 67 households, out of which 14.9% had children under the age of 18 living with them, 46.3% were married couples living together, 1.5% had a female householder with no husband present, and 50.7% were non-families. 43.3% of all households were made up of individuals, and 4.5% had someone living alone who was 65 years of age or older. The average household size was 2.00 and the average family size was 2.82.

In the CDP, the population was spread out, with 20.1% under the age of 18, 3.7% from 18 to 24, 27.6% from 25 to 44, 41.8% from 45 to 64, and 6.7% who were 65 years of age or older. The median age was 44 years. For every 100 females, there were 135.1 males. For every 100 females age 18 and over, there were 143.2 males.

The median income for a household in the CDP was $36,875, and the median income for a family was $41,250. Males had a median income of $60,750 versus $24,375 for females. The per capita income for the CDP was $22,593. There were 15.8% of families and 22.5% of the population living below the poverty line, including 34.6% of under eighteens and none of those over 64.

== Education ==
It was previously served by a school of the Yukon Flats School District.
