= Circle, Alaska =

Circle Danzhit Khànląįį (Gwichʼin)
- CDP
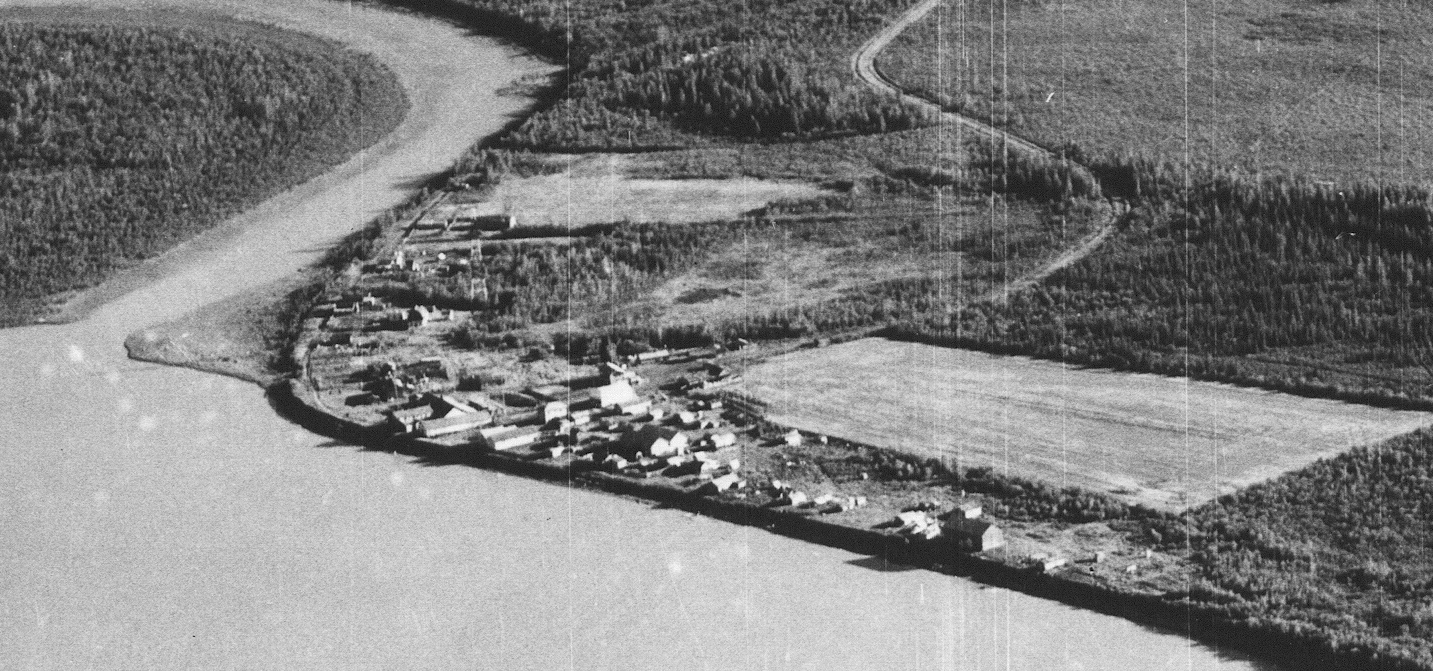
- View of Circle in 1941

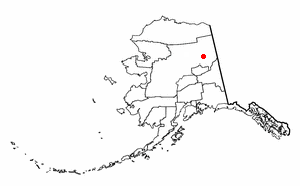
- Location of Circle, Alaska
- Coordinates: 65°49′31″N 144°03′43″W
- Country: United States
- State: Alaska
- Census Area: Yukon-Koyukuk

Government
  - State senator: Click Bishop (R)
  - State rep.: Mike Cronk (R)

Area
  - Total: 106.58 sq mi (276.04 km^{2})
  - Land: 106.04 sq mi (274.64 km^{2})
  - Water: 0.54 sq mi (1.40 km^{2})

Population (2020)
  - Total: 91
  - Density: 0.85/sq mi (0.33/km^{2})
- Time zone: UTC-9 (Alaska (AKST))
  - Summer (DST): UTC-8 (AKDT)
- ZIP code: 99733
- Area code: 907
- FIPS code: 02-14880

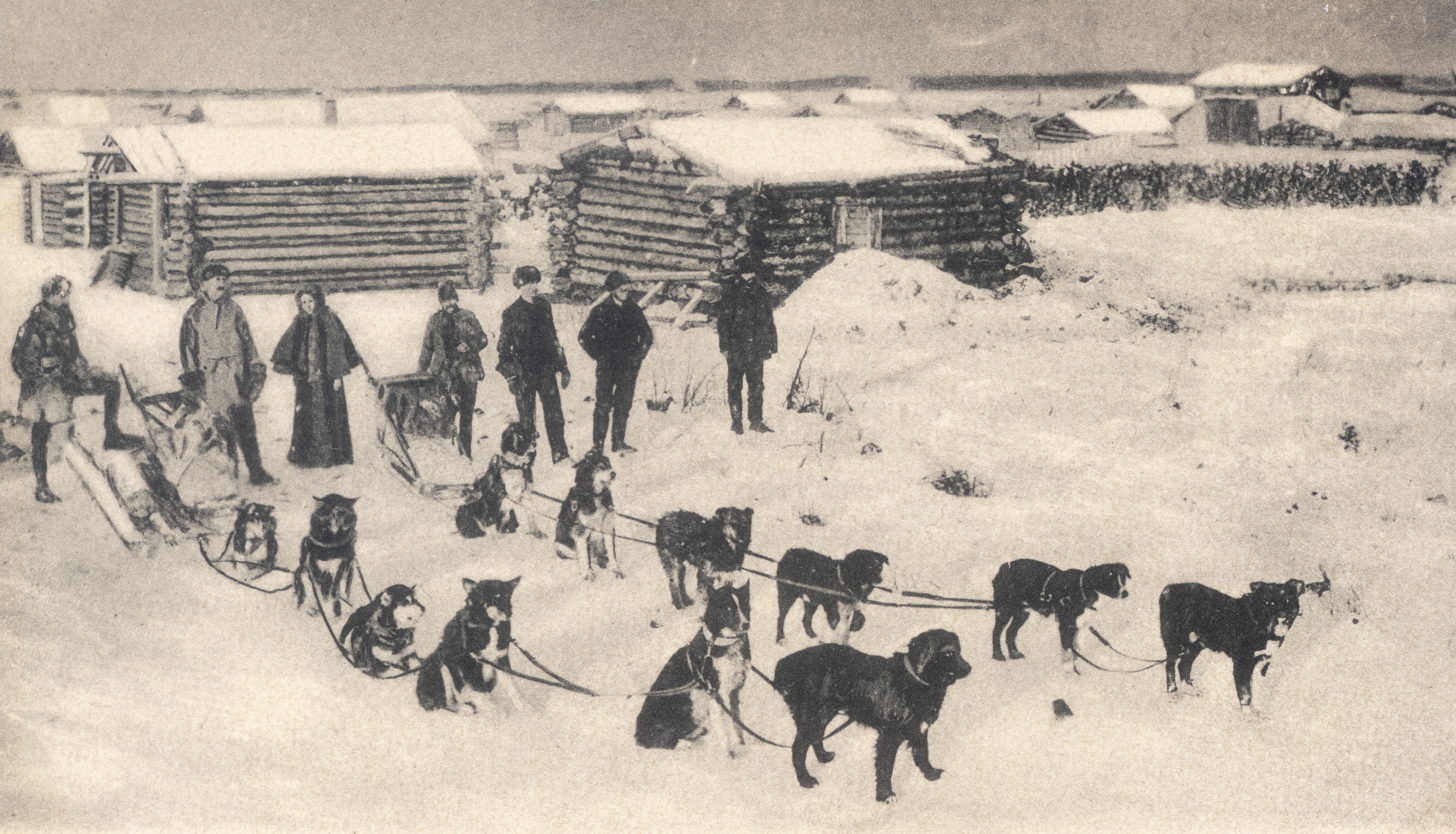
Early 20th century view of Circle City, as a sled dog team prepares to leave for Fort Gibbon with the mail.

Circle (also called Circle City; Gwichʼin: Danzhit Khànląįį) is a census-designated place (CDP) in Yukon-Koyukuk Census Area, Alaska, United States. At the 2020 census the population was 91, down from 104 in 2010.

Circle is 160 mi (260 km) northeast of Fairbanks at the end of the Steese Highway along the Yukon River. Circle was named by miners in the late 19th century who believed that the town was on the Arctic Circle, but the Arctic Circle is about 50 mi (80 km) north of Circle. Circle used to be an active freight hub for many villages along the Yukon.

Every February, Circle City hosts a checkpoint for the long-distance Yukon Quest sled dog race.

There is only one general store, Hutchinson Commercial, which also sells alcohol and houses the only fuel pump in town. The price of fuel is generally 35-40% higher than prices in Fairbanks.

Part of the events of The Golden Volcano (1906) by Jules Verne occur in Circle. Many of the events in John McPhee's 1976 non-fiction book Coming into the Country occur in Circle.

In Truman Capote's non-fiction book In Cold Blood, Perry Edward Smith mentions spending time with his father in Circle City.

== Geography ==
Circle is located at 65°50′4″N 144°4′35″W (65.834464, -144.076392).

According to the United States Census Bureau, the CDP has a total area of 108.2 square miles (280 km^{2}), of which 107.7 square miles (279 km^{2}) is land and 0.5 square miles (1.3 km^{2}) (0.50%) is water.

=== Climate ===
According to the Köppen Climate Classification system, Circle has a subarctic climate, abbreviated "Dfc" on climate maps. The hottest temperature recorded in Circle was 94 °F (34.4 °C) on July 25, 1955, and June 26, 2004, while the coldest temperature recorded was −60 °F (−51.1 °C) on December 15, 1946, January 23, 1951, January 19, 1952, December 24, 1961, December 28–20, 1961 and January 18, 1971.

Climate data for Circle, Alaska (Circle Hot Springs), 1991–2020 normals, extremes 1935–present
Month	Jan	Feb	Mar	Apr	May	Jun	Jul	Aug	Sep	Oct	Nov	Dec	Year
Record high °F (°C)	49 (9)	51 (11)	53 (12)	68 (20)	90 (32)	94 (34)	94 (34)	88 (31)	78 (26)	71 (22)	51 (11)	46 (8)	94 (34)
Mean maximum °F (°C)	24.9 (−3.9)	30.1 (−1.1)	35.9 (2.2)	57.5 (14.2)	75.3 (24.1)	83.4 (28.6)	83.9 (28.8)	78.9 (26.1)	67.2 (19.6)	48.8 (9.3)	26.6 (−3.0)	24.4 (−4.2)	85.9 (29.9)
Mean daily maximum °F (°C)	−8.6 (−22.6)	0.5 (−17.5)	14.7 (−9.6)	39.5 (4.2)	58.9 (14.9)	71.1 (21.7)	72.4 (22.4)	64.8 (18.2)	52.2 (11.2)	27.4 (−2.6)	3.9 (−15.6)	−4.5 (−20.3)	32.7 (0.4)
Daily mean °F (°C)	−15.6 (−26.4)	−9.2 (−22.9)	0.9 (−17.3)	25.3 (−3.7)	44.9 (7.2)	56.4 (13.6)	58.9 (14.9)	51.8 (11.0)	40.0 (4.4)	18.8 (−7.3)	−4.1 (−20.1)	−12.1 (−24.5)	21.3 (−5.9)
Mean daily minimum °F (°C)	−22.6 (−30.3)	−18.9 (−28.3)	−13.0 (−25.0)	11.0 (−11.7)	30.9 (−0.6)	42.6 (5.9)	45.4 (7.4)	38.9 (3.8)	27.9 (−2.3)	10.2 (−12.1)	−12.2 (−24.6)	−19.8 (−28.8)	10.0 (−12.2)
Mean minimum °F (°C)	−49.0 (−45.0)	−45.5 (−43.1)	−35.1 (−37.3)	−16.5 (−26.9)	16.7 (−8.5)	30.7 (−0.7)	32.7 (0.4)	24.6 (−4.1)	13.1 (−10.5)	−7.1 (−21.7)	−31.3 (−35.2)	−39.8 (−39.9)	−50.6 (−45.9)
Record low °F (°C)	−67 (−55)	−63 (−53)	−53 (−47)	−33 (−36)	−8 (−22)	19 (−7)	25 (−4)	19 (−7)	−5 (−21)	−41 (−41)	−49 (−45)	−60 (−51)	−67 (−55)
Average precipitation inches (mm)	0.44 (11)	0.32 (8.1)	0.17 (4.3)	0.25 (6.4)	0.71 (18)	2.64 (67)	2.61 (66)	1.80 (46)	1.35 (34)	0.84 (21)	0.44 (11)	0.48 (12)	12.05 (304.8)
Average snowfall inches (cm)	8.8 (22)	6.3 (16)	3.5 (8.9)	2.5 (6.4)	2.7 (6.9)	0.0 (0.0)	0.0 (0.0)	0.0 (0.0)	1.3 (3.3)	8.9 (23)	8.0 (20)	7.9 (20)	49.9 (126.5)
Average extreme snow depth inches (cm)	19.5 (50)	20.3 (52)	21.3 (54)	21.6 (55)	8.4 (21)	0.0 (0.0)	0.0 (0.0)	0.0 (0.0)	2.4 (6.1)	8.2 (21)	11.5 (29)	14.7 (37)	21.6 (55)
Average precipitation days (≥ 0.01 in)	7.0	4.0	3.6	2.7	5.7	9.2	13.0	11.9	10.3	8.4	6.2	7.1	89.1
Average snowy days (≥ 0.1 in)	9.8	6.7	5.5	3.1	1.2	0.0	0.0	0.0	1.2	7.6	9.6	8.7	53.4
Source 1: NOAA
Source 2: National Weather Service

== Demographics ==
Historical population
Census	Pop.	Note	%±
1900	242		—
1910	144		−40.5%
1920	96		−33.3%
1930	50		−47.9%
1940	98		96.0%
1950	83		−15.3%
1960	41		−50.6%
1970	54		31.7%
1980	81		50.0%
1990	73		−9.9%
2000	100		37.0%
2010	104		4.0%
2020	91		−12.5%
U.S. Decennial Census

Circle first appeared on the 1900 U.S. Census as "Circle City," although it was an unincorporated village. Its name was shortened to Circle for the 1910 census. It was made a census-designated place in 1980.

At the 2000 census, there were 100 people, 34 households and 22 families residing in the CDP. The population density was 0.9 inhabitants per square mile (0.35/km^{2}). There were 42 housing units at an average density of 0.4 per square mile (0.15/km^{2}). The racial makeup of the CDP was 14.00% White, 76.00% Native American, 1.00% from other races, and 9.00% from two or more races. 4.00% of the population were Hispanic or Latino of any race.

There were 34 households, of which 29.4% had children under the age of 18 living with them, 11.8% were married couples living together, 32.4% had a female householder with no husband present, and 32.4% were non-families. 23.5% of all households were made up of individuals, and 5.9% had someone living alone who was 65 years of age or older. The average household size was 2.94 and the average family size was 3.48.

29.0% of the population was under the age of 18, 10.0% from 18 to 24, 27.0% from 25 to 44, 30.0% from 45 to 64, and 4.0% who were 65 years of age or older. The median age was 34 years. For every 100 females, there were 100.0 males. For every 100 females age 18 and over, there were 115.2 males.

The median household income was $11,667, and the median family income was $11,250. Males had a median income of $0 versus $23,750 for females. The per capita income for the CDP was $6,426. There were 50.0% of families and 42.0% of the population living below the poverty line, including 57.9% of under eighteens and none of those over 64.

== History ==
Circle was established in 1893 when gold was discovered in Birch Creek; it served as an unloading point for supplies shipped up the Yukon River from the Bering Sea. The goods were sent overland to gold mining camps. In 1896, before the Klondike Gold Rush, Circle was the largest mining town on the Yukon River and had a population of 700. It had a store, a few dance halls, an opera house, a library, a school, a hospital, an American Episcopal church, a newspaper, a mill, and several federal officials: United States commissioner, marshal, customs inspector, tax collector and a postmaster.

Circle lost much of its population after gold discoveries in the Klondike in 1897, and Nome in 1899. A few miners stayed near Circle. Mining in the area has continued into the 21st century. Most of the residents of Circle today are Athabascan.

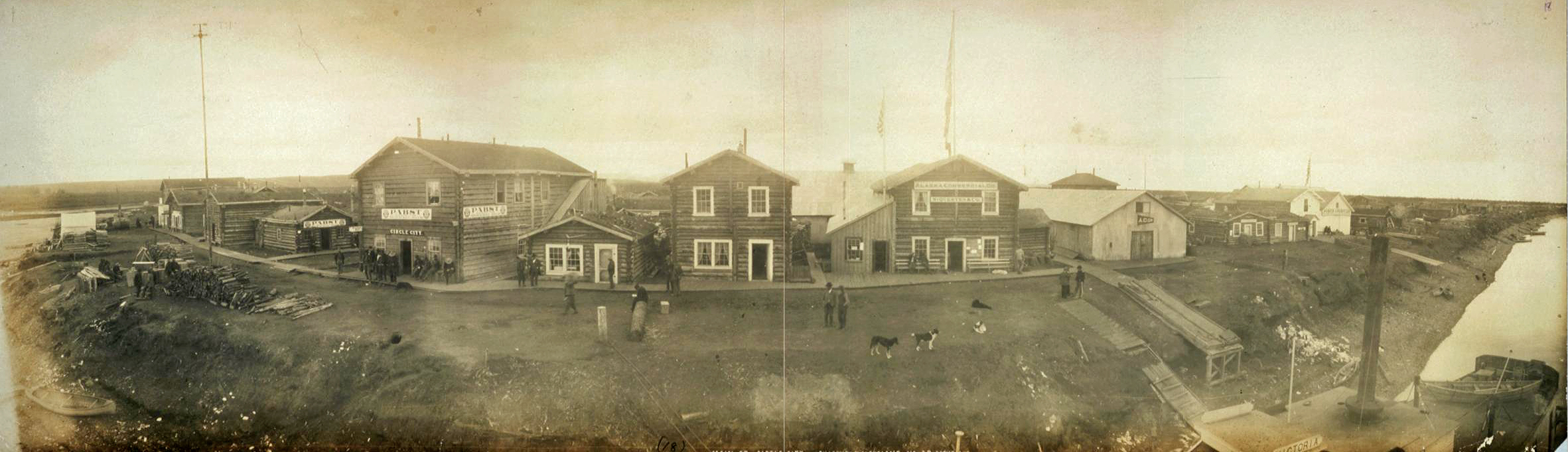
Panoramic view of Circle's main street, September 1899.

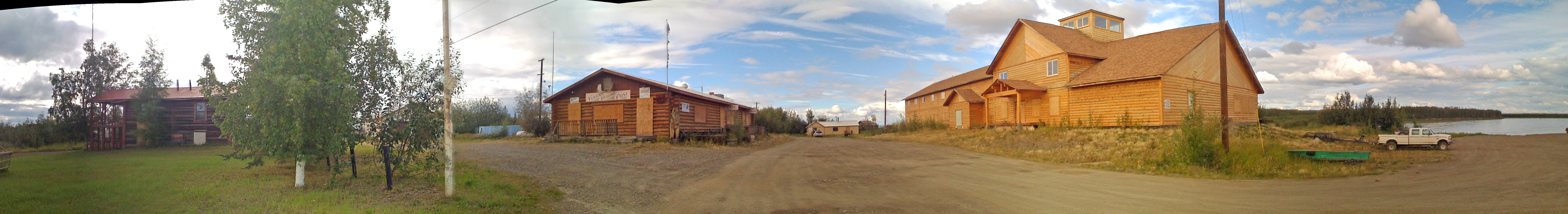
Panoramic view of Circle, Alaska, on August 6, 2008. At far right is the Yukon River.

== Education ==
Yukon Flats School District operates the Circle School.
