= Cascade Peak =

Mountain summit in Washington, US

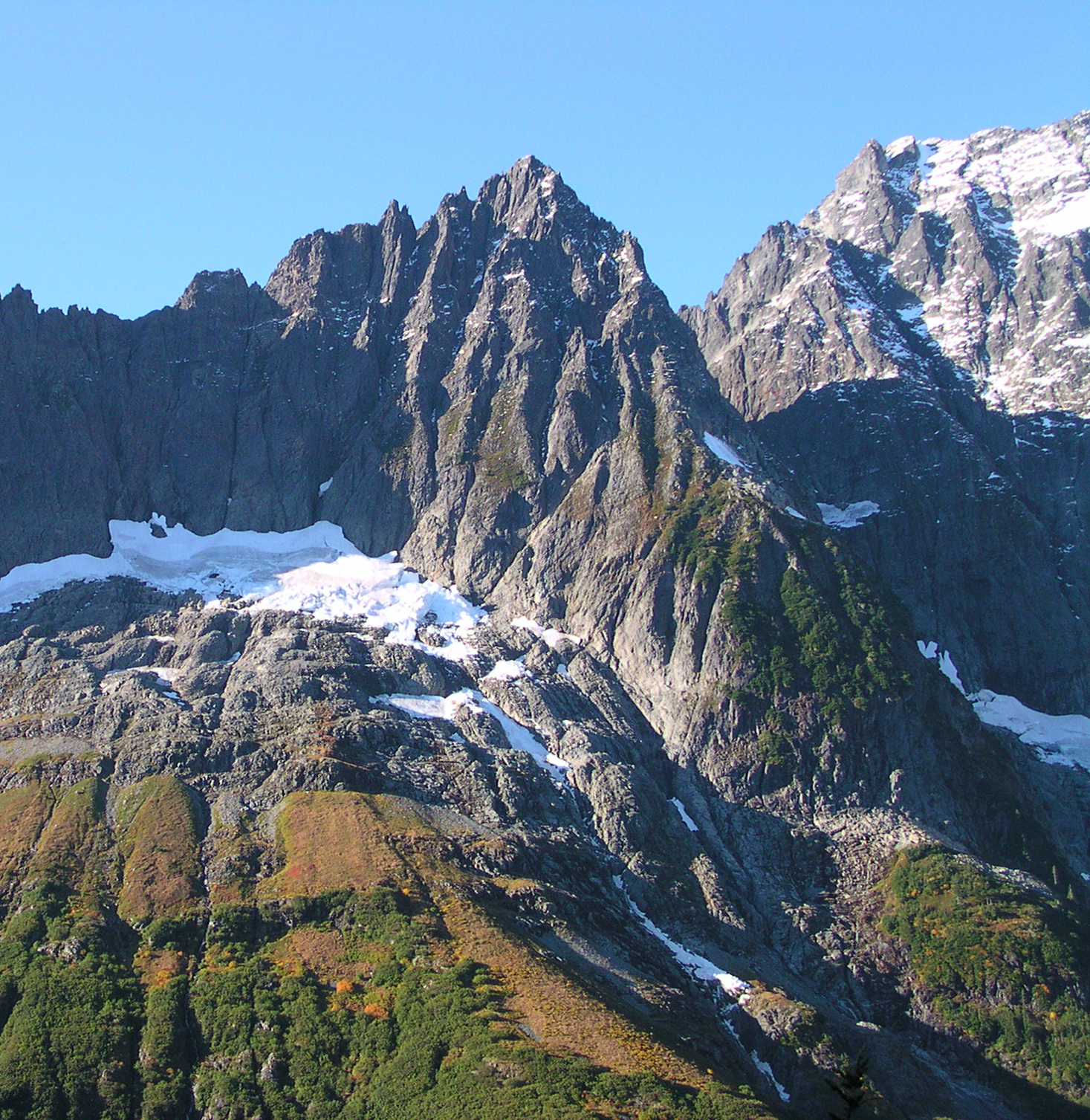
- Cascade Peak seen from Sahale Arm

Highest point
- Elevation: 7,428 ft (2,264 m)
- Prominence: 628 ft (191 m)
- Parent peak: Johannesburg Mountain (8200 ft)
- Isolation: 0.55 mi (0.89 km)
- Coordinates: 48°27′48″N 121°04′49″W

Geography
- Location within Washington (state) Location within the United States
- Country: United States
- State: Washington
- County: Skagit
- Protected area: North Cascades National Park; Glacier Peak Wilderness
- Parent range: North Cascades; Cascade Range
- Topo map: USGS Cascade Pass

Geology
- Rock type: Breccia

Climbing
- First ascent: July 23, 1950 by Fred Beckey, Pete Schoening, Phil Sharpe
- Easiest route: glacier travel, class 3-4 scrambling

Cascade Peak is a 7,428-foot (2,264-metre) mountain summit located in Skagit County of Washington state. It is in the North Cascades, which is a subrange of the Cascade Range. The peak is situated above Cascade Pass, on the shared border of North Cascades National Park and Glacier Peak Wilderness. The nearest higher peak is Johannesburg Mountain, 0.53 miles (0.85 km) to the west-southwest, and The Triplets stand guard 0.35 miles (0.56 km) to the east-southeast. Surface runoff from the mountain drains into the Cascade River.

== Climate ==
Cascade Peak is located in the marine west coast climate zone of western North America. Weather fronts originating in the Pacific Ocean travel northeast toward the Cascade Mountains. As fronts approach the North Cascades, they are forced upward by the peaks of the Cascade Range (orographic lift), causing them to drop their moisture in the form of rain or snowfall onto the Cascades. As a result, the west side of the North Cascades experiences high precipitation, especially during the winter months in the form of snowfall. Because of maritime influence, snow tends to be wet and heavy, resulting in high avalanche danger. During winter months, weather is usually cloudy, but due to high pressure systems over the Pacific Ocean that intensify during summer months, there is often little or no cloud cover during the summer.

== Geology ==
The North Cascades features some of the most rugged topography in the Cascade Range with craggy peaks and ridges, and deep glacial valleys. Geological events occurring many years ago created the diverse topography and drastic elevation changes over the Cascade Range leading to the various climate differences.

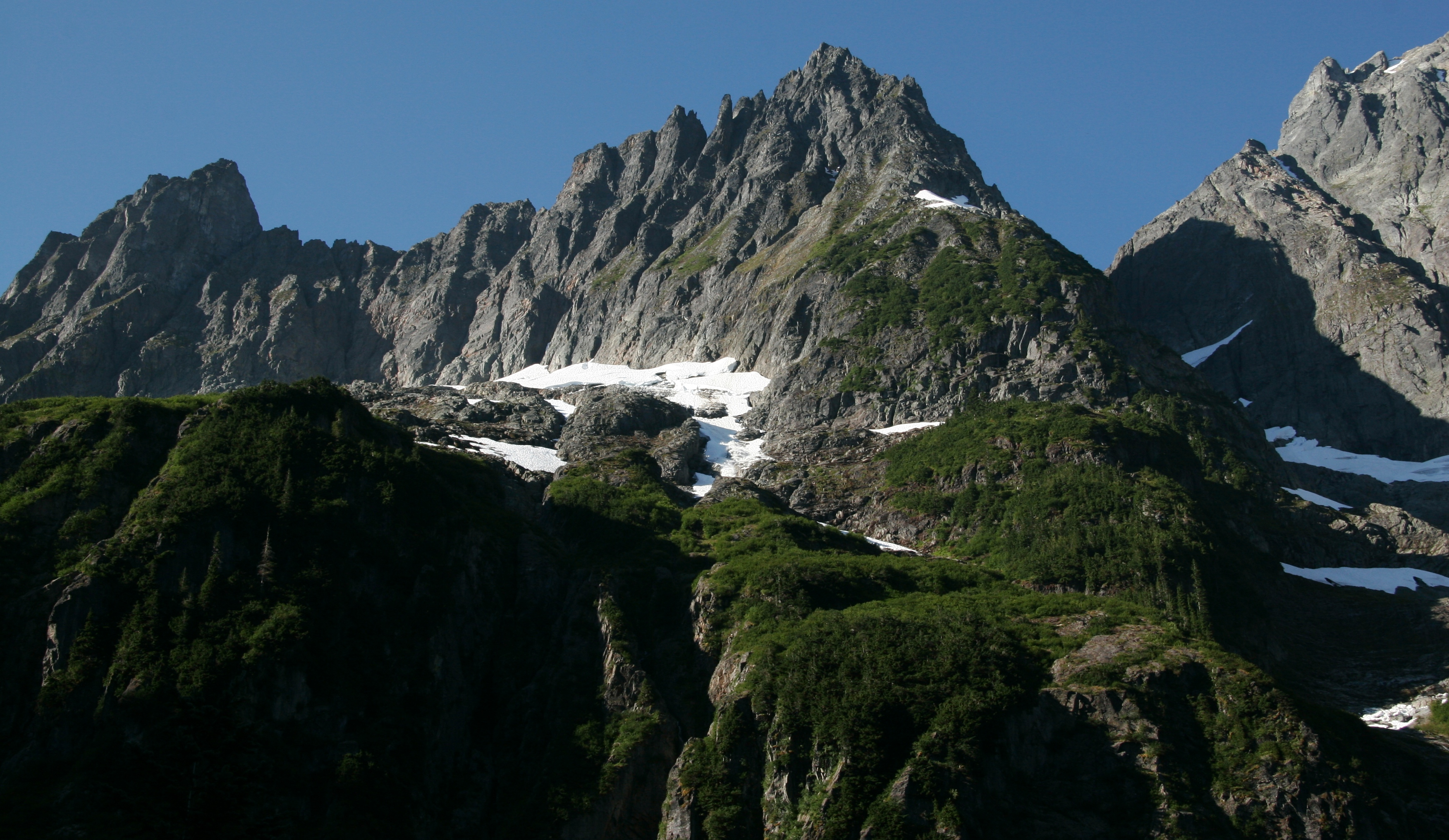
Cascade Peak from Cascade Pass trail

The history of the formation of the Cascade Mountains dates back millions of years ago to the late Eocene Epoch. With the North American Plate overriding the Pacific Plate, episodes of volcanic igneous activity persisted. In addition, small fragments of the oceanic and continental lithosphere called terranes created the North Cascades about 50 million years ago.

During the Pleistocene period dating back over two million years ago, glaciation advancing and retreating repeatedly scoured the landscape leaving deposits of rock debris. The U-shaped cross section of the river valleys is a result of recent glaciation. Uplift and faulting in combination with glaciation have been the dominant processes which have created the tall peaks and deep valleys of the North Cascades area. Small glacier remnants remain on the north side of Cascade Peak.

== See also ==
- Geography of the North Cascades
- Geology of the Pacific Northwest
