= Mount Seattle =

Mountain in Alaska and Yukon

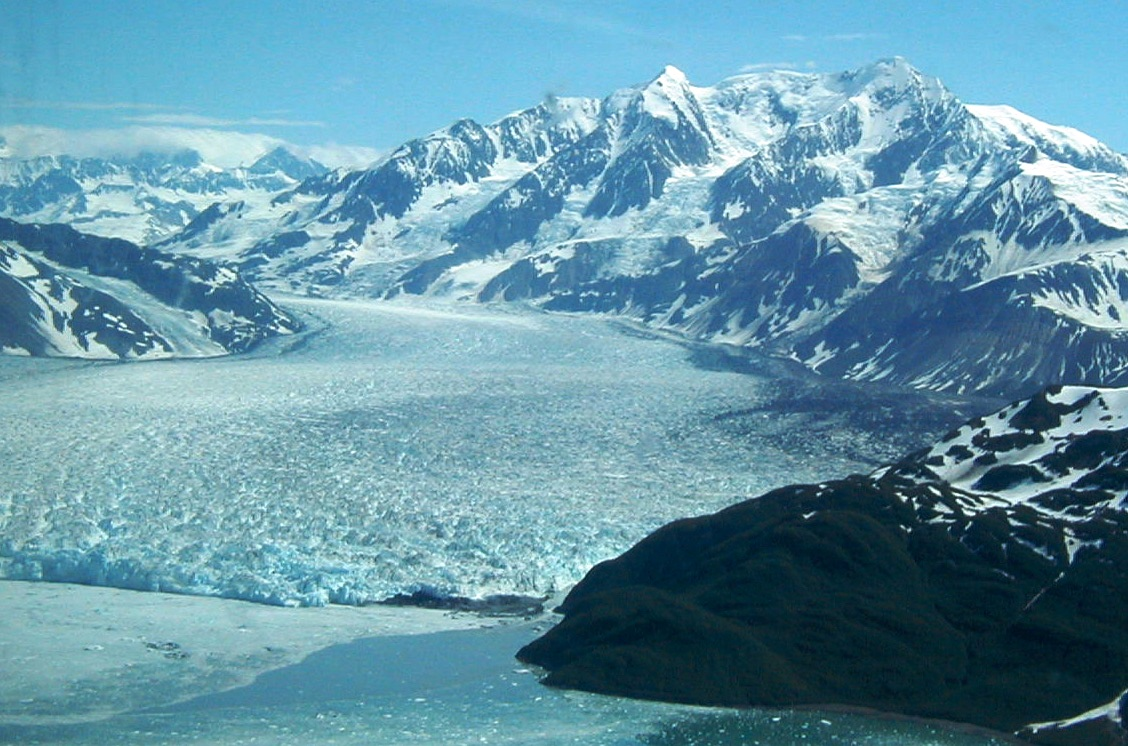
- Mount Seattle above Hubbard Glacier

Highest point
- Elevation: 10,350 ft (3,150 m)
- Prominence: 5,494 ft (1,675 m)
- Isolation: 18 km (11 mi)
- Listing: United States prominent peak 87th
- Coordinates: 60°05′19″N 139°11′54″W

Geography
- Location within Alaska Location within Yukon
- Location: Yakutat, Alaska, U.S.; Yukon, Canada
- Parent range: Saint Elias Mountains
- Topo map(s): USGS Mount Saint Elias A-4; Canada NTS 115B3 Mount Seattle

Climbing
- First ascent: Fred Beckey team, 1966

Mount Seattle is a 10,350-foot (3,150 m) peak in the Saint Elias Mountains on the border of Alaska, United States and Yukon, Canada. It was named for the city of Seattle, home of the "camp hands" of a 19th-century National Geographic Society–United States Geological Survey scientific expedition to the Hubbard Glacier and Mount Saint Elias. It is called the "most prominent Alaskan coastal peak" and blocks sight of larger inland peaks, even Mount Logan nearly twice its height.

It was first ascended in May 1966 by Fred Beckey, Eric Bjornstad and four other climbers.

== Gallery ==
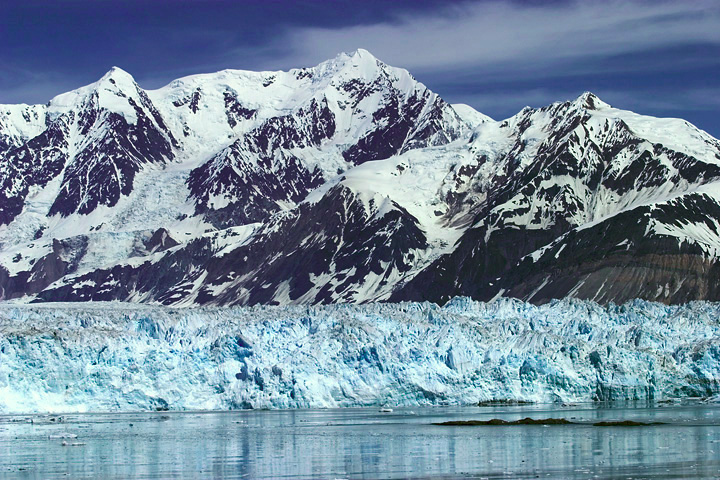
Mount Seattle and Hubbard Glacier

== See also ==
- List of mountain peaks of North America
  - List of mountain peaks of the United States
    - List of Ultras of the United States
