= Tinayguk River =

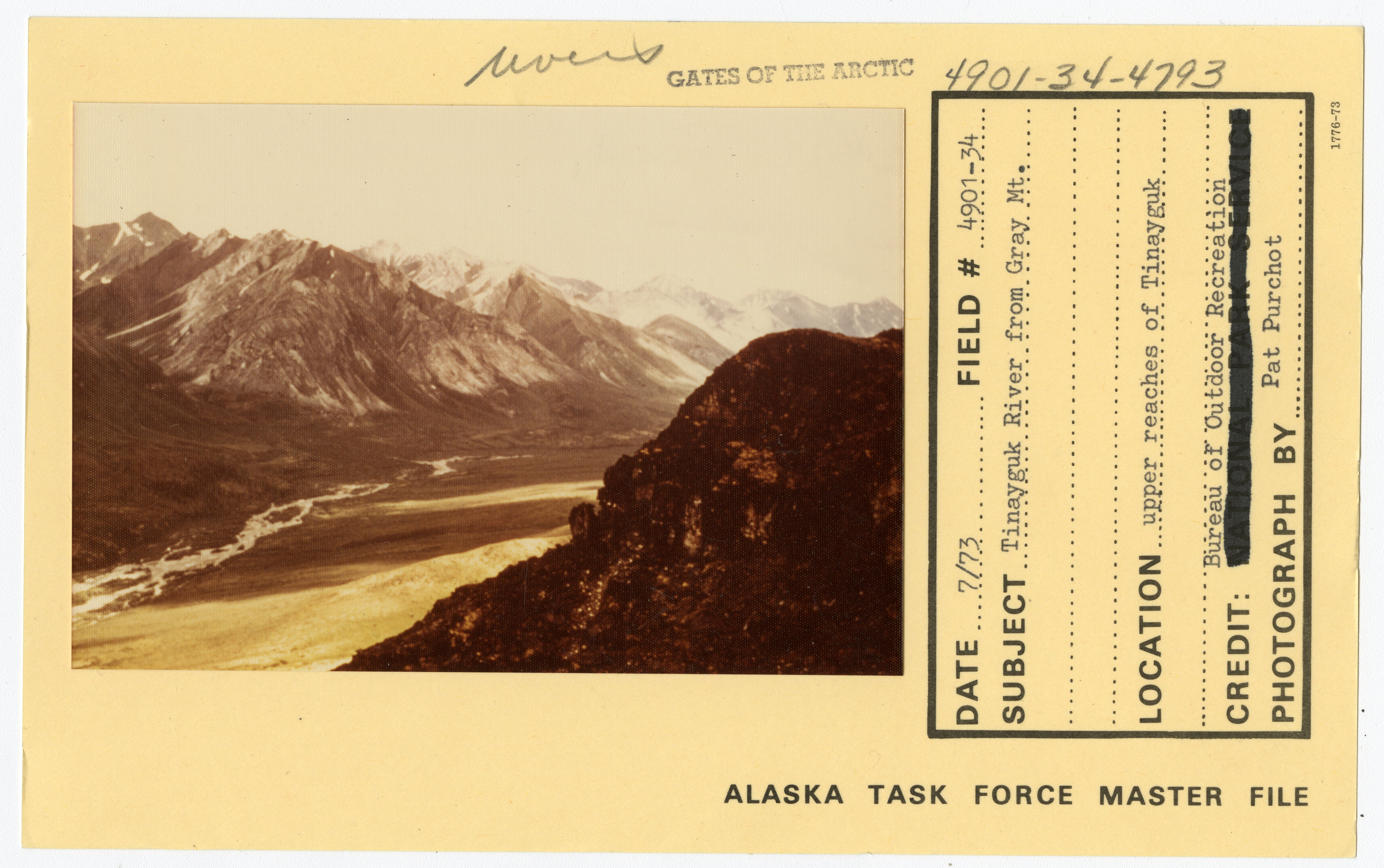
- Tinayguk River from Gray Mountain

- Location of the mouth of the Tinayguk River in Alaska

Location
- Country: United States
- State: Alaska
- Census Area: Yukon–Koyukuk

Physical characteristics
- Source: Brooks Range
  - location: Endicott Mountains
  - coordinates: 67°57′04″N 151°00′34″W
  - elevation: 4,619 ft (1,408 m)
- Mouth: North Fork Koyukuk River
  - location: 27 miles (43 km) northwest of Wiseman
  - coordinates: 67°34′08″N 151°02′30″W
  - elevation: 1,161 ft (354 m)
- Length: 44 mi (71 km)

National Wild and Scenic River
- Type: Wild
- Designated: December 2, 1980

The Tinayguk River is a 44-mile (71 km) tributary of the North Fork Koyukuk River in the U.S. state of Alaska. Heading in the Endicott Mountains of the Brooks Range, the river flows generally west then south to meet the larger river about 80 miles (130 km) north of Bettles.

In 1980, the entire river was designated "wild" and added to the National Wild and Scenic Rivers System. The designation means that the Tinayguk is unpolluted, free-flowing and generally inaccessible except by trail and that its watershed is essentially primitive.

The river's name means Moose in Inupiat. In 1930, forester Robert "Bob" Marshall recommended it as an alternative to West Fork, a local name that Marshall considered over-used.

== Boating ==
Although whitewater enthusiasts sometimes run the river in small rafts or inflatable canoes or kayaks, it is remote, hazardous, and difficult to reach. It is a small one-channel river that drops 80 feet per mile (15 m/km) over its first 12 miles (19 km) and an average of 25 feet per mile (4.7 m/km) over the rest of its course. The upper reaches are rated Class III (difficult) on the International Scale of River Difficulty, while the rest of the river varies between Class II (medium) and Class III. Hazards include swift current, shallow water, sharp bends, logjams, boulders, and aufeis.

== See also ==
- List of National Wild and Scenic Rivers
- List of rivers of Alaska
