= Mount Kiev =

Mountain in Alaska, United States

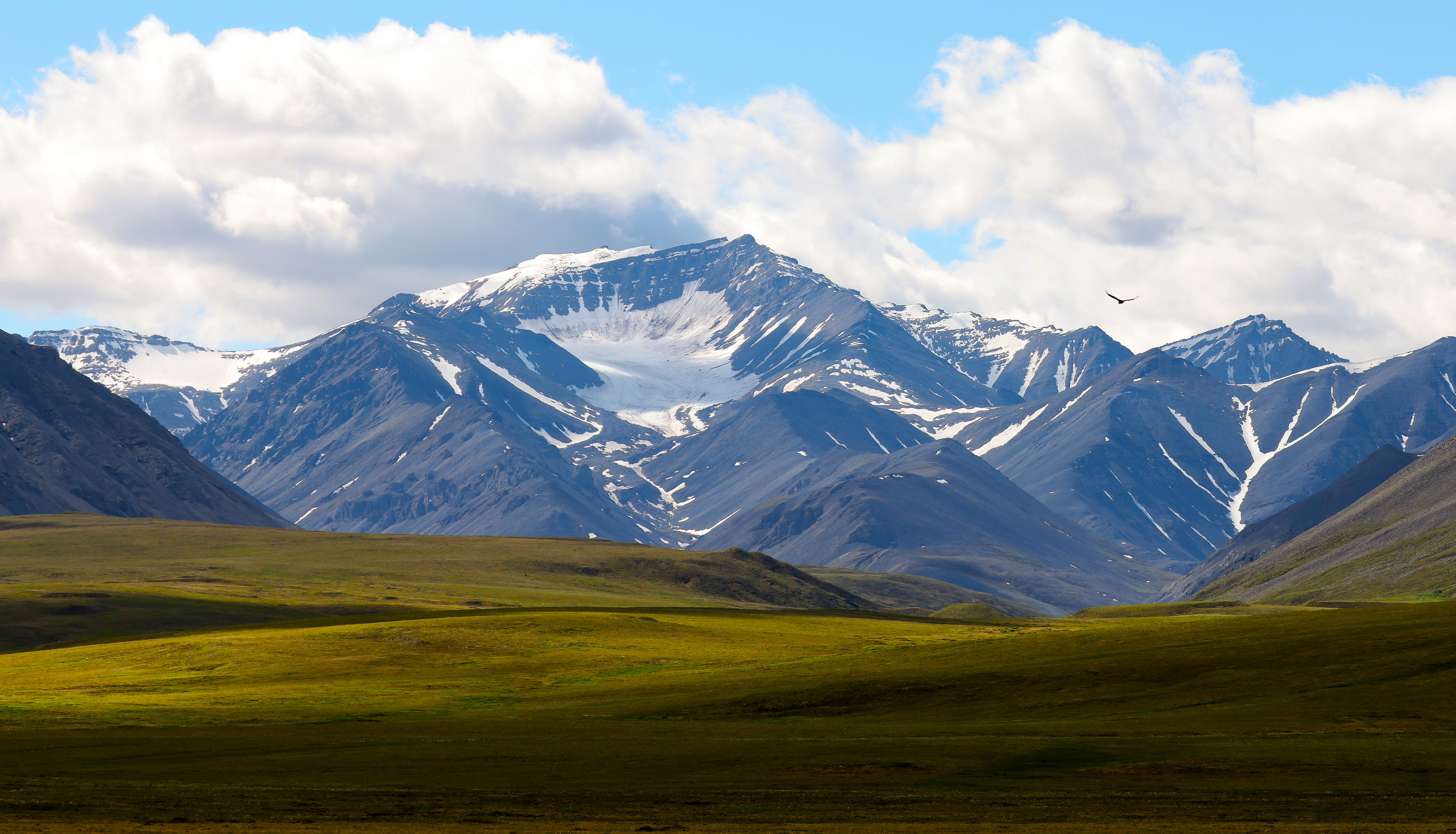
- North aspect in summer

Highest point
- Elevation: 7,775 ft (2,370 m)
- Prominence: 3,123 ft (952 m)
- Parent peak: Cloud Peak (7,920 ft)
- Isolation: 28.1 mi (45.2 km)
- Coordinates: 68°19′52″N 149°32′49″W

Geography
- Location within Alaska
- Country: United States
- State: Alaska
- Borough: North Slope
- Protected area: Gates of the Arctic National Park and Preserve
- Parent range: Endicott Mountains; Brooks Range
- Topo map: USGS Philip Smith Mountains B-5

Mount Kiev is a 7,775-foot-elevation (2,370-meter) mountain summit located in Alaska, United States.

== Description ==
Mount Kiev is the highest point in the Endicott Mountains which are a subrange of the Brooks Range. It is set five miles (8.0 km) west of the Dalton Highway on the northeast boundary of Gates of the Arctic National Park and Preserve. Precipitation runoff from the mountain drains east into tributaries of the Atigun River and west into tributaries of the Itikmalac River which in turn flows into the Itkillik River. Topographic relief is significant as the summit rises approximately 4,775 feet (1,455 meters) above the Atigun Valley in four miles (6.4 km) and 4,275 feet (1,303 meters) above the Itikmalac Valley in three miles (4.8 km). Galbraith Lake is eight miles (13 km) to the north-northeast, whereas the Continental Divide and Atigun Pass are 15 miles (24 km) to the south. The nearest community is Prudhoe Bay, 250 miles (400 km) to the north. The mountain's toponym has not been officially adopted by the United States Board on Geographic Names.

== Climate ==
According to the Köppen climate classification system, Mount Kiev is located in a subarctic climate zone with cold, snowy winters, and cool summers. Winter temperatures can drop below −20 °F with wind chill factors below −30 °F. This climate supports a small unnamed glacier on the peak's north slopes.

== See also ==
- List of mountain peaks of Alaska
