= Agnes Mountain =

Mountain in Washington (state), United States

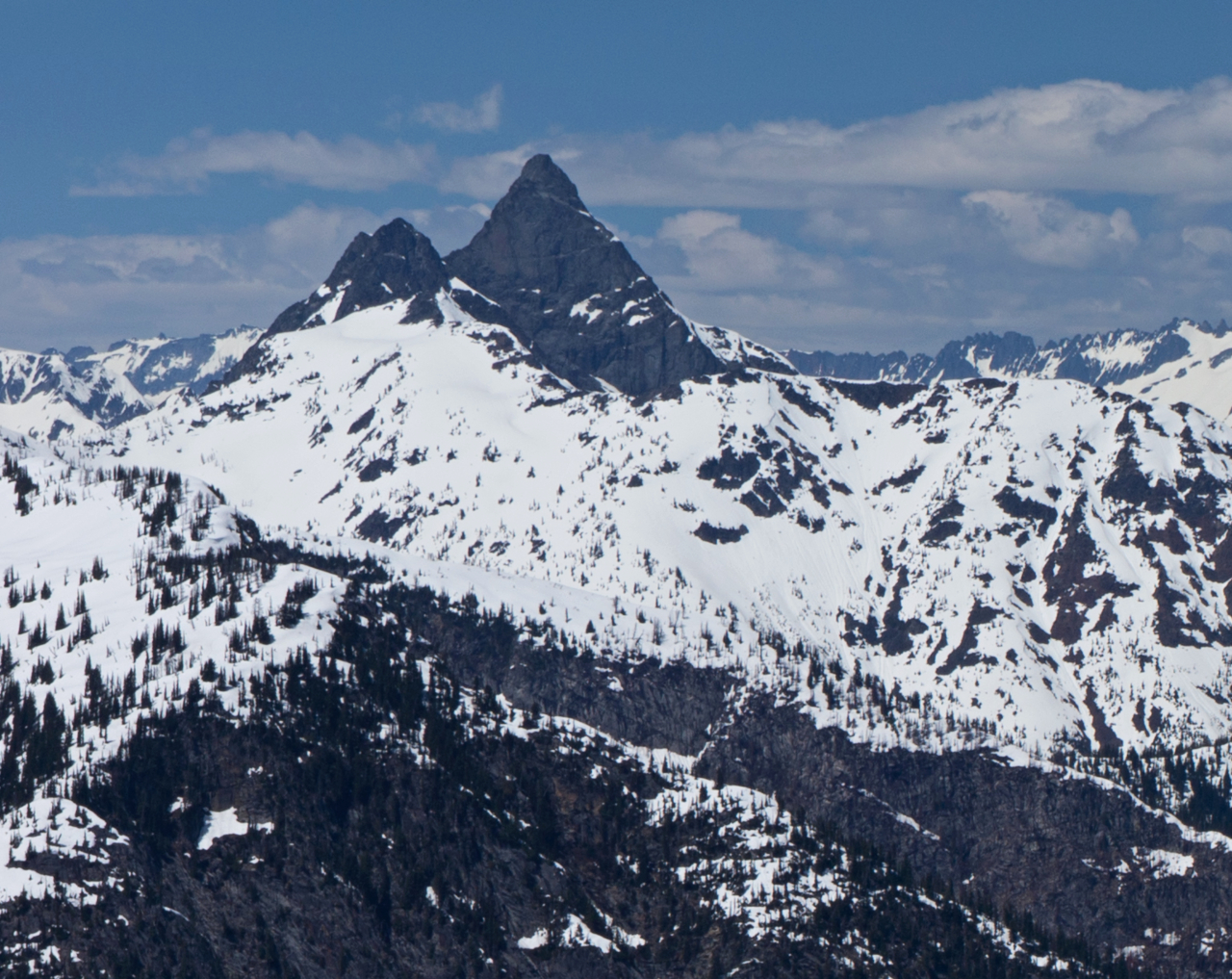
- Agnes Mountain

Highest point
- Elevation: 8,119 ft (2,475 m) NAVD 88
- Prominence: 1,355 ft (413 m)
- Coordinates: 48°19′03″N 120°58′03″W

Geography
- Location within Washington (state)
- Interactive map of Agnes Mountain
- Location: Chelan County, Washington, U.S.
- Parent range: North Cascades
- Topo map: USGS Agnes Mountain

Climbing
- First ascent: 1936 by W. Ronald Frazier and Dan O'Brien
- Easiest route: Northeast/South Ridge Route, class 5.6

Agnes Mountain is a dramatic, but relatively unknown, peak in the North Cascades of the US state of Washington. It is not of regionally high elevation, but it rises steeply from low footings; Beckey calls it "an immense Matterhorn-shaped massif." For example, its north face drops 1,800 feet (549 m) from the summit to Agnes Creek in only 1.5 miles (2.4 km).

Agnes Mountain was climbed first in 1936, by W. Ronald Frazier and Dan O'Brien. They ascended from the West Fork of Agnes Creek. The second ascent was not until 1969. The recommended route in Beckey's guide first follows the Northeast Ridge of nearby Asa Peak, then traverses to the south ridge of Agnes, which involves some short technical sections (up to class 5.6).

Due to its location deep in the North Cascades, its difficult approaches, and the fact that it is not particularly high, Agnes is seldom climbed. Beckey notes that "only fourteen parties succeeded by 1987."

== Geology ==
The North Cascades features some of the most rugged topography in the Cascade Range with craggy peaks, ridges, and deep glacial valleys. Geological events occurring many years ago created the diverse topography and drastic elevation changes over the Cascade Range leading to the various climate differences.

The history of the formation of the Cascade Mountains dates back millions of years ago to the late Eocene Epoch. With the North American Plate overriding the Pacific Plate, episodes of volcanic igneous activity persisted. In addition, small fragments of the oceanic and continental lithosphere called terranes created the North Cascades about 50 million years ago.

During the Pleistocene period dating back over two million years ago, glaciation advancing and retreating repeatedly scoured the landscape leaving deposits of rock debris. The U-shaped cross section of the river valleys is a result of recent glaciation. Uplift and faulting in combination with glaciation have been the dominant processes which have created the tall peaks and deep valleys of the North Cascades area.

== Gallery ==
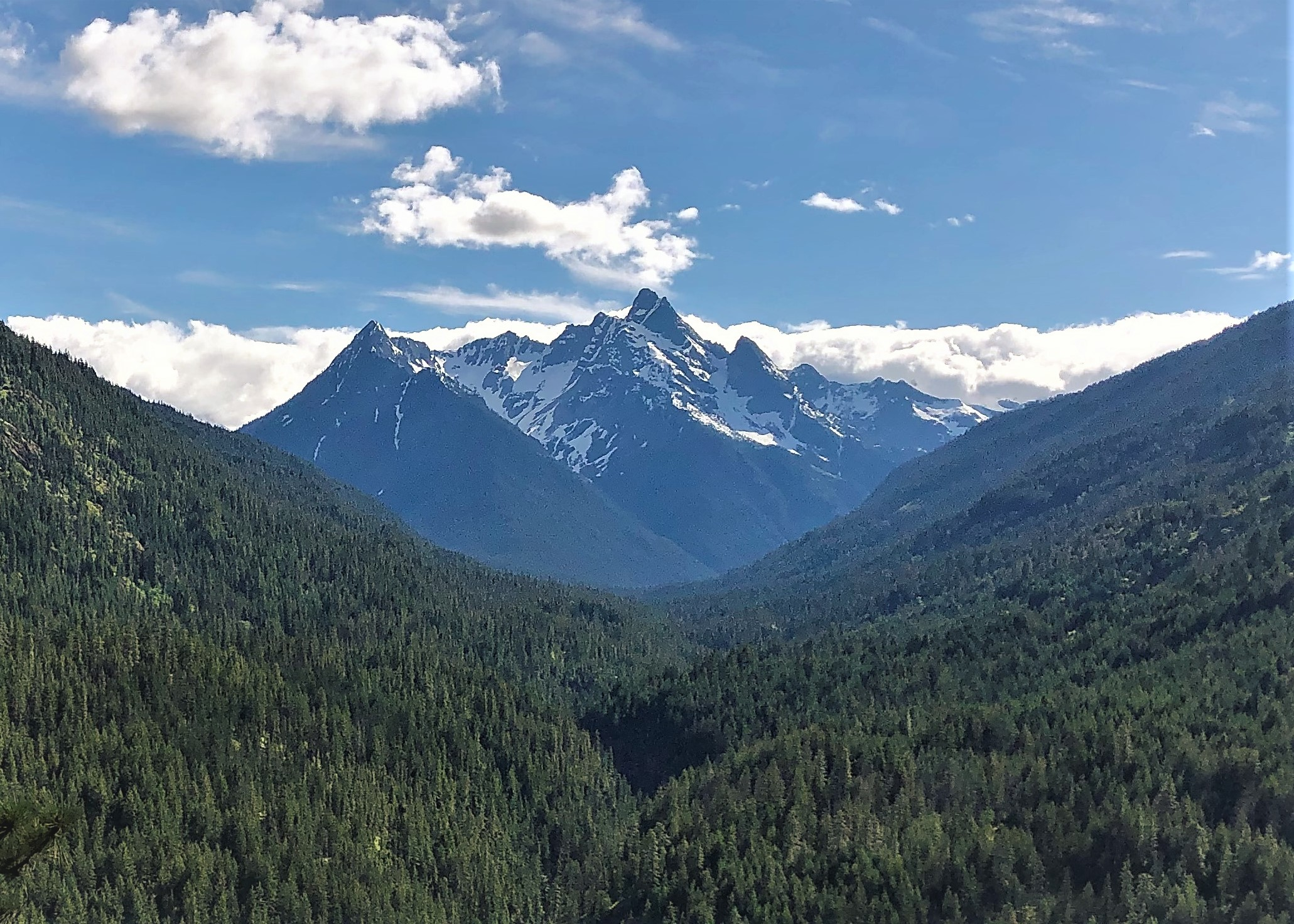
Agnes Mountain from Howard Lake Trail
