= Zeus and Moses =

Rock formations in Utah, United States

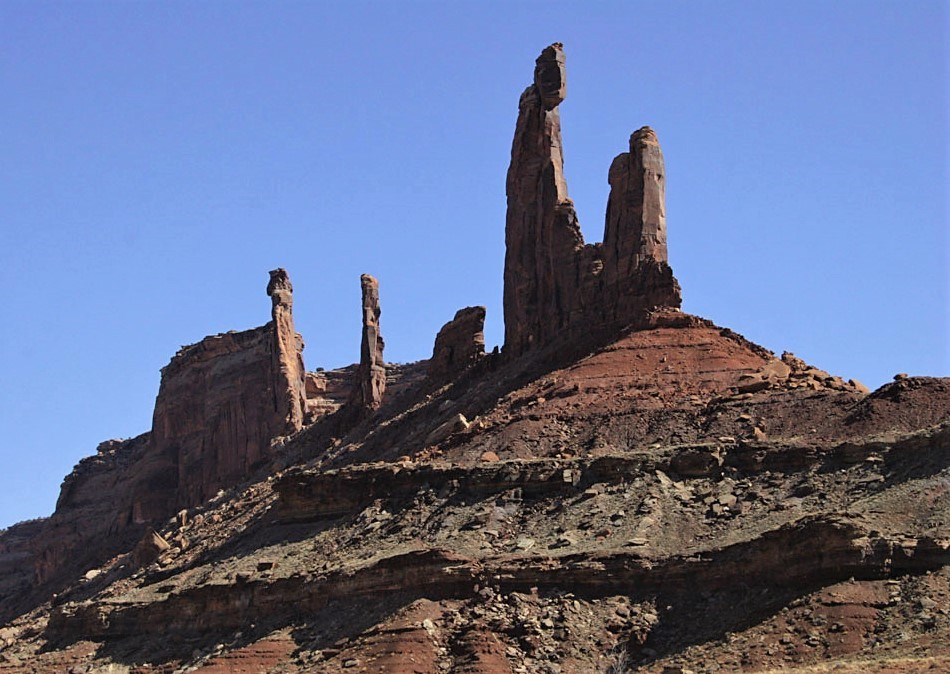
- Zeus and Moses from the west (Aphrodite, Zeus, The Ark, Moses, Thracian Mare)

Highest point
- Elevation: 5,132 ft (1,564 m)
- Prominence: 372 ft (113 m)
- Parent peak: Aphrodite (5,151 ft)
- Isolation: 0.26 mi (0.42 km)
- Coordinates: 38°28′32″N 109°54′38″W

Geography
- Location within Utah Location within the United States
- Country: United States
- State: Utah
- County: San Juan
- Protected area: Canyonlands National Park
- Parent range: Colorado Plateau
- Topo map: USGS Upheaval Dome

Geology
- Rock age: Late Triassic
- Rock type: Wingate Sandstone

Climbing
- First ascent: Zeus 1970. Moses 1972.
- Easiest route: class 5.11a Climbing

Zeus and Moses (also known as Moses and Zeus) are a pair of 500-foot-tall (150 m) sandstone formations located in the Island in the Sky District of Canyonlands National Park, in San Juan County, Utah, United States. These rock towers' names refer to Zeus, a god in Greek mythology, and Moses, an important prophet in several religious traditions. Zeus and Moses are composed of Wingate Sandstone, which is the remains of wind-borne sand dunes deposited approximately 200 million years ago in the Late Triassic. This formation is situated in Taylor Canyon, 3 mi (4.8 km) north-northeast of Upheaval Dome. Access to the towers is via the four-wheel-drive White Rim Road, and a spur road into Taylor Canyon (Canyonlands National Park backcountry permit required for access). The top of this geological formation rises 900 feet above the canyon floor at road's end, approximately one-half mile away. Precipitation runoff from Zeus and Moses drains into the nearby Green River via Taylor Canyon.

== Climbing ==
The first ascent of Zeus was made in September 1970 by Fred Beckey and Eric Bjornstad via the class 5.7 A0 East Ridge. This climbing route no longer exists as the bolts have been removed. Sisyphus is a class 5.11 route up dihedrals on the south face.

The first ascent of Moses was made in 1972 by Eric Bjornstad, Fred Beckey, Jim Galvin, Tom Nephew, and Gregory Markov, via the class 5.8 A3 north face. The second ascent of Moses was made in March 1973 by Stewart Green, Jim Dunn, Doug Snively, and Kurt Rasmussen via the (class 5.11) Dunn Route. Free climbing routes on Moses include class 5.12c Pale Fire, first climbed by Chip Chase and Charlie Fowler in 1981, along with the classic Primrose Dihedrals route, class 5.11 on the south face, first climbed by Ed Webster and Steve Hong in 1979.

== Climate ==
Spring and fall are the most favorable seasons to visit Zeus and Moses. According to the Köppen climate classification system, it is located in a Cold semi-arid climate zone, which is defined by the coldest month having an average mean temperature below −0 °C (32 °F) and at least 50% of the total annual precipitation being received during the spring and summer. This desert climate receives less than 10 inches (250 millimetres) of annual rainfall, and snowfall is generally light during the winter.

== Gallery ==
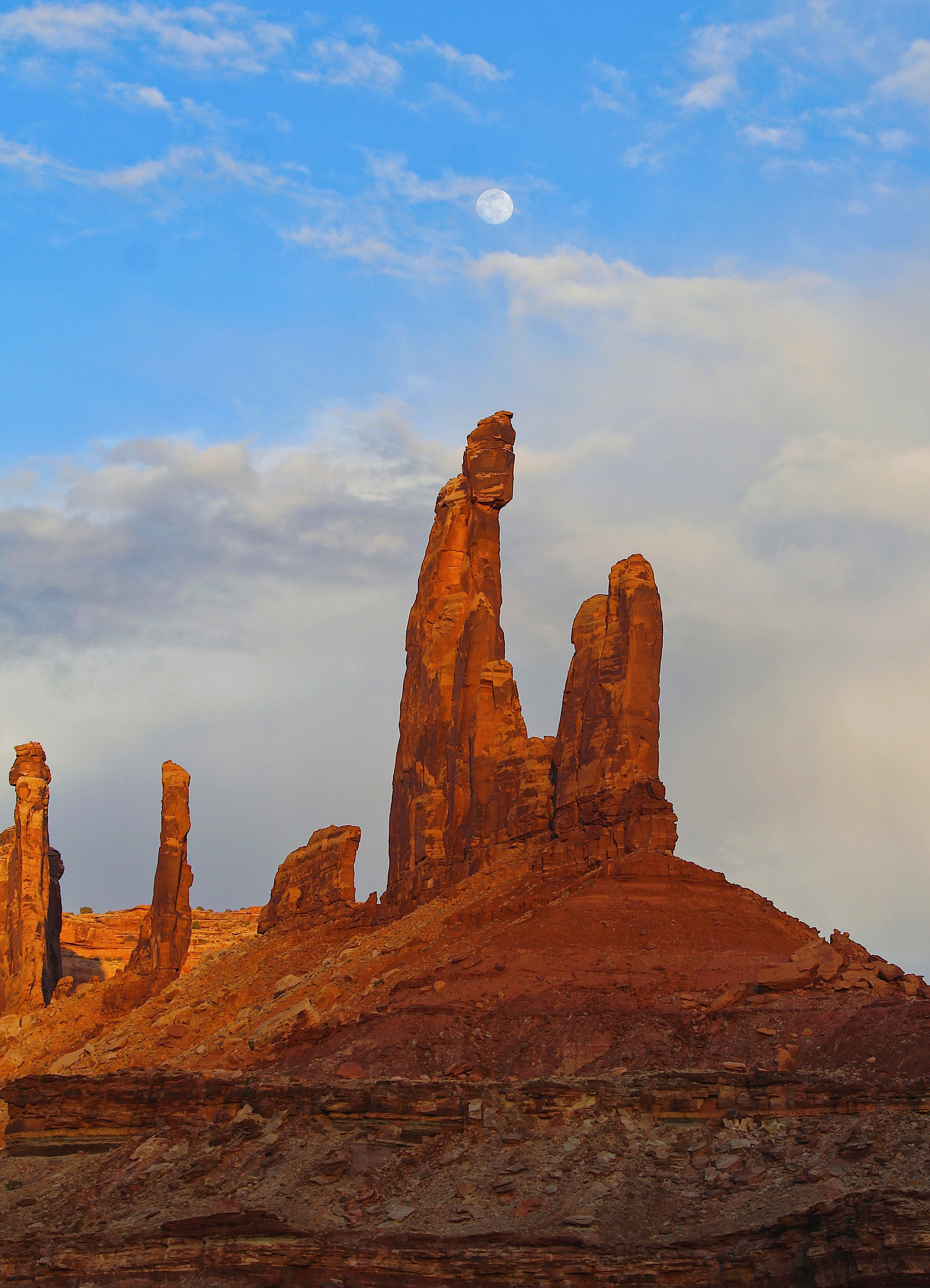
Moses and Zeus

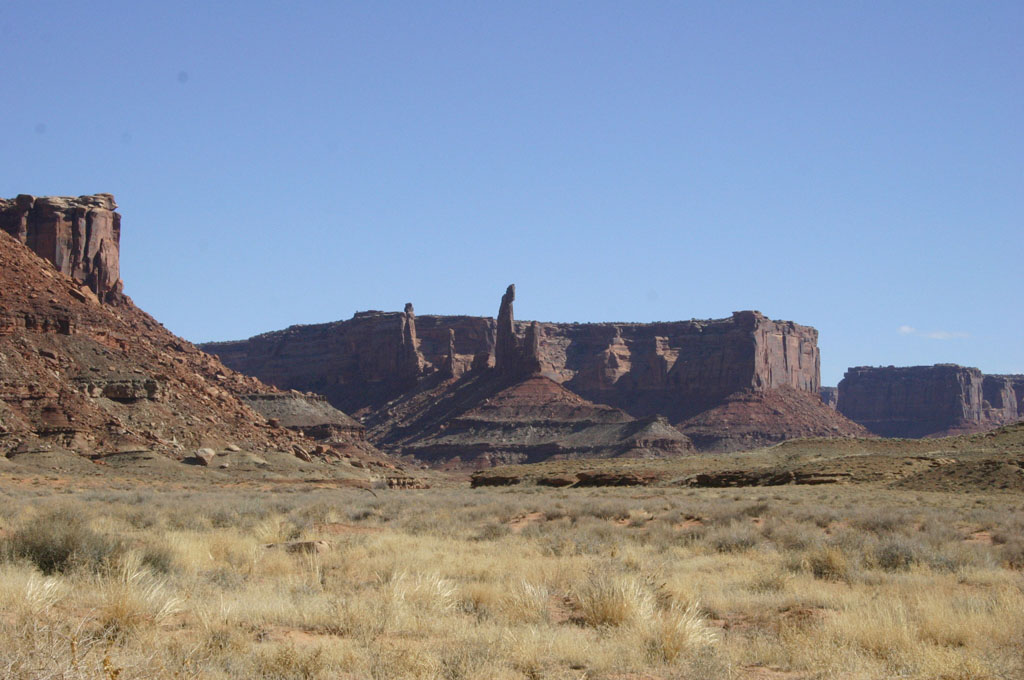

== See also ==
- Colorado Plateau
- Geology of the Canyonlands area
