= The Triplets (Washington) =

Mountain in Washington, United States

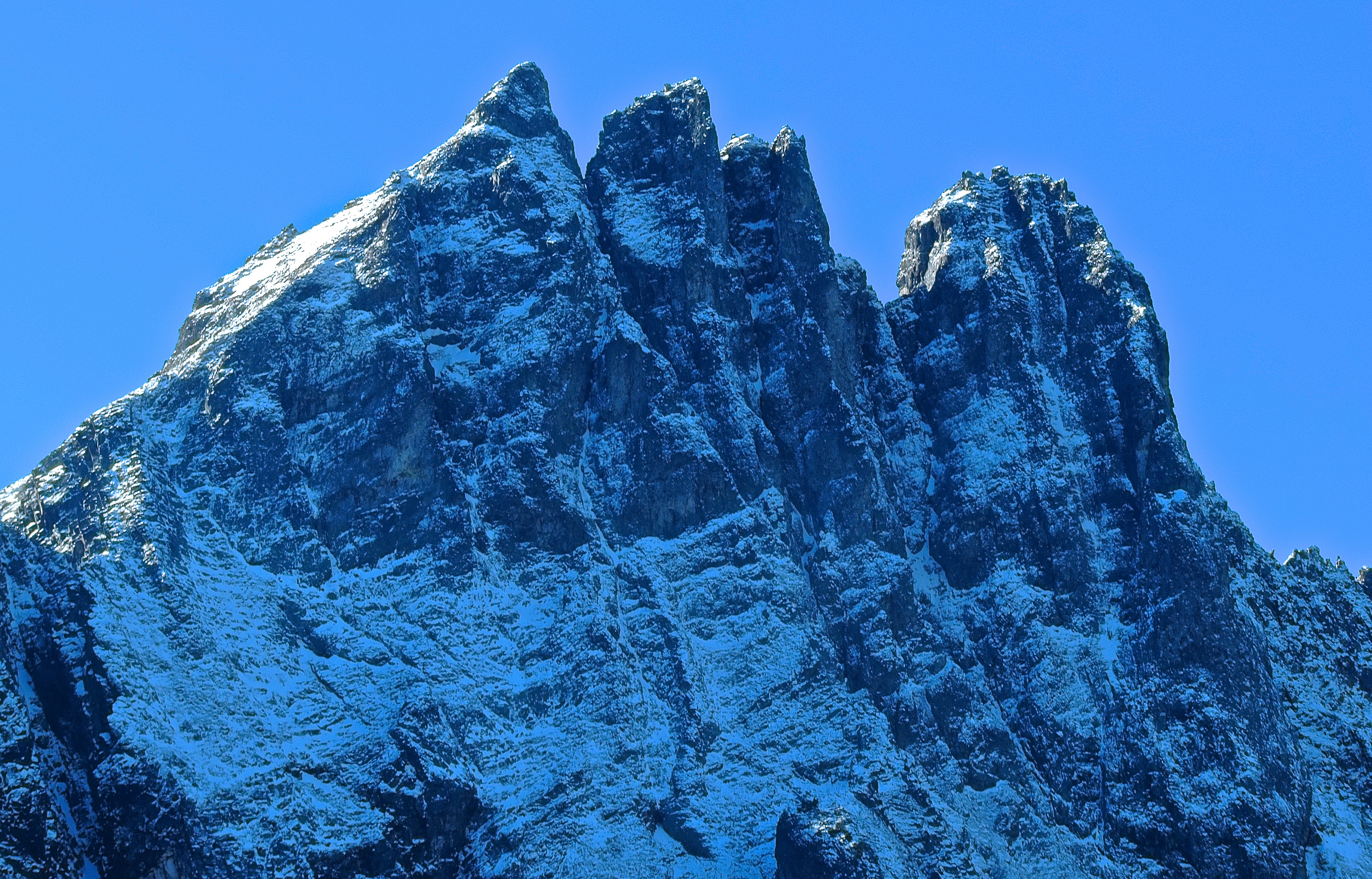
- The Triplets

Highest point
- Elevation: 7,240 ft (2,210 m)
- Prominence: 360 ft (110 m)
- Parent peak: Cascade Peak (7,428 ft)
- Isolation: 0.37 mi (0.60 km)
- Coordinates: 48°27′40″N 121°04′23″W

Geography
- Location within Washington (state) Location within the United States
- Interactive map of The Triplets
- Country: United States
- State: Washington
- County: Skagit
- Protected area: North Cascades National Park; Glacier Peak Wilderness
- Parent range: North Cascades
- Topo map: USGS Cascade Pass

Geology
- Rock type: Breccia

Climbing
- First ascent: 1945; Fred Beckey, Jack Schwabland
- Easiest route: class 4 climbing

The Triplets is a 7,240+ ft (2,210+ m) summit located in Skagit County of Washington state. This breccia triple pinnacle is part of the North Cascades. The Triplets is situated above Cascade Pass on the shared border of North Cascades National Park and Glacier Peak Wilderness. The nearest higher neighbor is Cascade Peak, 0.35 miles (0.56 km) to the west-northwest. Surface runoff from the mountain drains into the Cascade River.

== Climate ==
The Triplets is located in the marine west coast climate zone of western North America. Most weather fronts coming off the Pacific Ocean travel northeast toward the Cascade Mountains. As fronts approach the North Cascades, they are forced upward by the peaks of the Cascade Range (orographic lift), causing them to drop their moisture in the form of rain or snow onto the Cascades. As a result, the west side of the North Cascades experiences high precipitation, especially during the winter months in the form of snowfall. Because of maritime influence, snow tends to be wet and heavy, resulting in high avalanche danger. During winter months, weather is usually cloudy, but, due to high pressure systems over the Pacific Ocean that intensify during summer months, there is often little or no cloud cover during the summer.

== Geology ==
The North Cascades features some of the most rugged topography in the Cascade Range with craggy peaks and ridges, and deep glacial valleys. Geological events occurring many years ago created the diverse topography and drastic elevation changes over the Cascade Range leading to the various climate differences. These climate differences lead to vegetation variety defining the ecoregions in this area.

The history of the formation of the Cascade Mountains dates back millions of years ago to the late Eocene Epoch. With the North American Plate overriding the Pacific Plate, episodes of volcanic igneous activity persisted. In addition, small fragments of the oceanic and continental lithosphere called terranes created the North Cascades about 50 million years ago.

During the Pleistocene period dating back over two million years ago, glaciation advancing and retreating repeatedly scoured the landscape leaving deposits of rock debris. The U-shaped cross section of the river valleys is a result of recent glaciation. Uplift and faulting in combination with glaciation have been the dominant processes which have created the tall peaks and deep valleys of the North Cascades area.

== Gallery ==
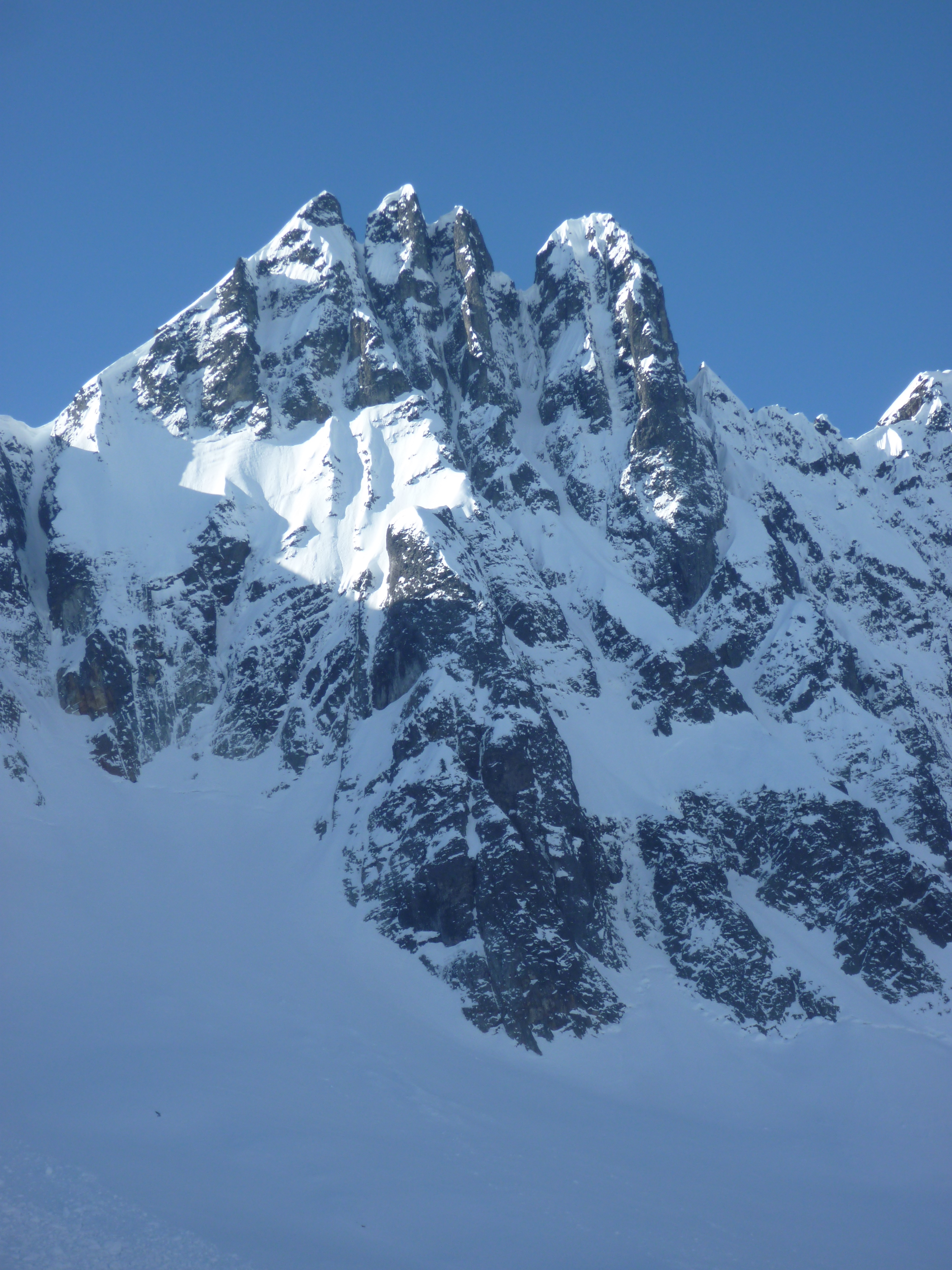
In winter

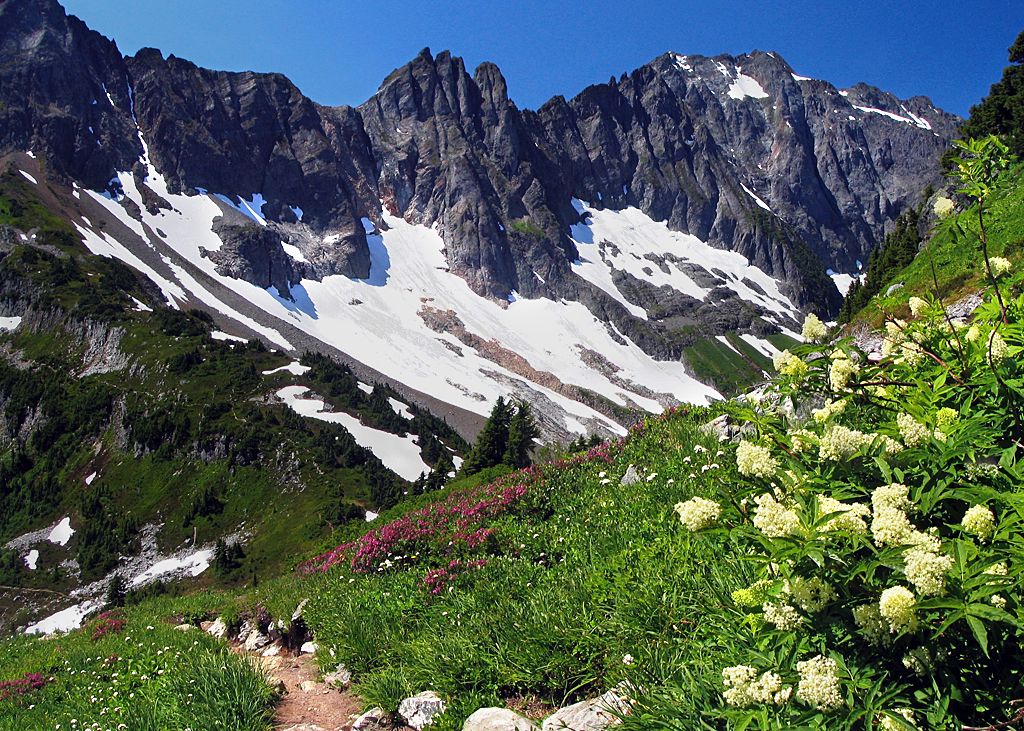
The Triplets from Sahale Arm

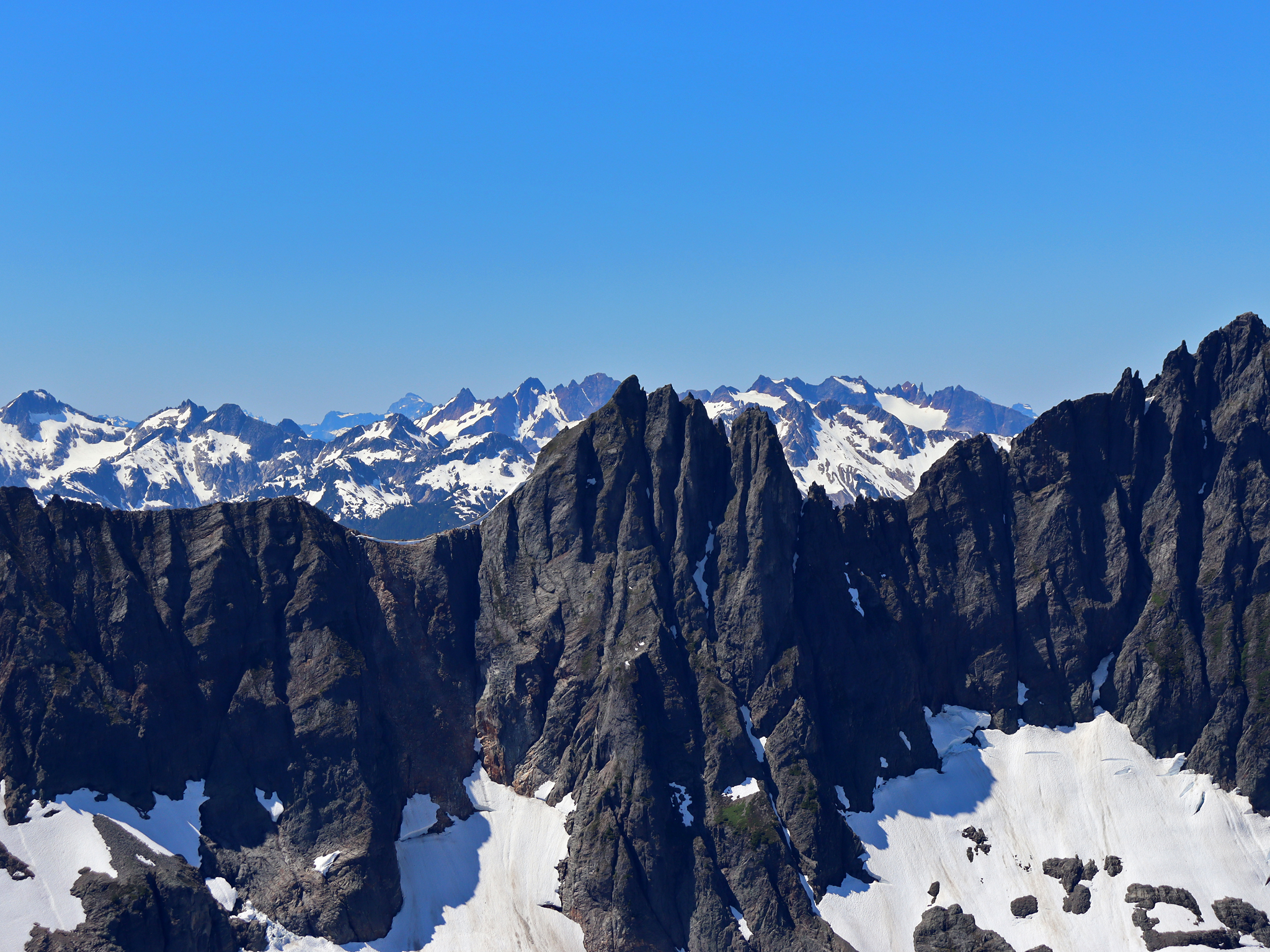
The Triplets centered

== See also ==
- Geography of the North Cascades
