= Alfred Tissières =

Swiss molecular biologist (1917–2003)

- Born: 14 October 1917; Martigny, Switzerland
- Died: 7 June 2003 (aged 85)
- Education: Lausanne; Molteno Institute for Research in Parasitology; Harvard University, Pasteur Institute
- Known for: Elucidating the role of ribosomes in protein biosynthesis
- Awards: Marcel Benoist Prize
- Scientific career
- Fields: Molecular biology
- Institutions: California Institute of Technology; King's College, Cambridge; University of Geneva
- Academic advisors: David Keilin, Herschel K. Mitchell, James Watson, François Gros

Alfred Tissières (October 14, 1917 – June 7, 2003) was a Swiss molecular biologist, a pioneer in highlighting the role of ribosomes in protein biosynthesis and the initiator of studies on heat shock proteins synthesized by cells subjected to stress. He shared the Marcel Benoist Prize with Edouard Kellenberger in 1966.

== Early life and education ==
Tissières was born on October 14, 1917 in Martigny. He comes from the neighboring town of Orsières.

After studying medicine in Lausanne, where he obtained a doctorate in 1946, Tissières left to do a PhD in England at Cambridge, at the Molteno Institute for Research in Parasitology in the laboratory of David Keilin.

== Professional and scientific career ==
From 1951 to 1952, he carried out a postdoctoral internship in the laboratory of Max Delbrück at the California Institute of Technology. He worked there on the respiration of enterobacteria with Herschel K. Mitchell. In 1953 he returned to Cambridge as a research fellow at King's College.

From 1957 to 1961, he was a research associate at Harvard with James Watson. There he carried out pioneering work on the ribosomes of Escherichia coli, these structures had just been described by microscopy by George Palade. Tissières showed that they are formed of two subunits and that they are linked to messenger RNAs.

Next, during a short stay at the Pasteur Institute in the laboratory of Jacques Monod in 1959 he showed, with François Gros he met at Harvard, that ribosomes are capable of incorporating amino acids into proteins. In his Nobel Prize lecture in 1968, Marshall Warren Nirenberg cited this work as having been decisive for his own discoveries. In 1963, Tissières was appointed professor at the University of Geneva where he created a laboratory dedicated to the study of ribosomes.

In 1972, he completed a sabbatical stay in the laboratory of Herschel K. Mitchell at the California Institute of Technology. There he discovered that fly cells subjected to heat shock type stress synthesize particular proteins. This synthesis was linked to the “puffs” described in 1962 by Ferruccio Ritossa on polytene chromosomes from fly salivary glands subjected to the same stresses. These “puffs” were an indication of transcription from DNA to RNA, which suggested that stresses triggered gene expression. Thus this work by Tissières established the correspondence between the “puffs” and the synthesis of a group of proteins which were called heat shock proteins. Since then, numerous studies in very varied fields of biology have been devoted to these proteins which are at the origin of the concept of chaperone protein. From 1973, his laboratory devoted itself to the characterization of heat shock proteins and the regulation of messenger RNA transcription of the corresponding genes.

== Awards ==
- Marcel Benoist Prize shared with Edouard Kellenberger in 1966

== Learned societies ==
Member of the council of the European Molecular Biology Organization (EMBO) from 1968 to 1973

== Personal life ==
His father, Jules Tissières was a catholic conservative conseiller national for the Parti démocrate-chrétien (Suisse) from 1911 to 1918. Tissières married Virginia Wachob, an American national.

An experienced mountaineer, Tissières was among the first to climb the south face of the Täschhorn and the north ridge of the Dent Blanche. He is credited with the 1952 first ascent of Mount Doonerak in the Brooks Range of Alaska. In 1954, with the Cambridge University Mountaineering Club, he unsuccessfully attempted the ascent of Rakaposhi (7780 m) in Pakistan with George Band, one of the members of the team that had conquered Everest in 1953, a contemporary film of the expedition is in the public domain. Tissières campaigned for peace and nuclear disarmament by participating in several meetings of the Pugwash movement from 1990 to 2000.

== Legacy ==
The Cell Stress Society International, has offered since 2005 an annual award (biennial until 2019) in memory of Tissières to a young researcher, the Alfred Tissières Young Investigator Award.

== Main scientific contributions ==
- Localization of the heat shock-induced proteins in Drosophila melanogaster tissue culture cells (1980) A P Arrigo, S Fakan, A Tissières Dev Biol 1980 Jul;78(1):86-103. doi: 10.1016/0012-1606(80)90320-6.
- Protein synthesis in salivary glands of Drosophila melanogaster: relation to chromosome puffs (1974) A Tissières, H K Mitchell, U M Tracy; J Mol Biol Apr 15;84(3):389-98. doi: 10.1016/0022-2836(74)90447-1.
- Amino acid incorporation into proteins by Escherichia coli ribosomes (1960) Tissières A, Schlessinger D, Gros F. Proc Natl Acad Sci U S A. Nov;46(11):1450-63. doi:10.1073.
- Ribonucleoprotein particles from Escherichia coli. Tissières, A; Watson, JD; Schlessinger, D; Hollingworth, BR. J Mol Biol Volume 1 Issue 3 Page 221-233 (1959)
- Ribonucleoprotein particles from Escherichia Coli, Tissières, A and Watson, JD. Nature 182 (4638) (1958), pp. 778–780
