= Itkillik River =

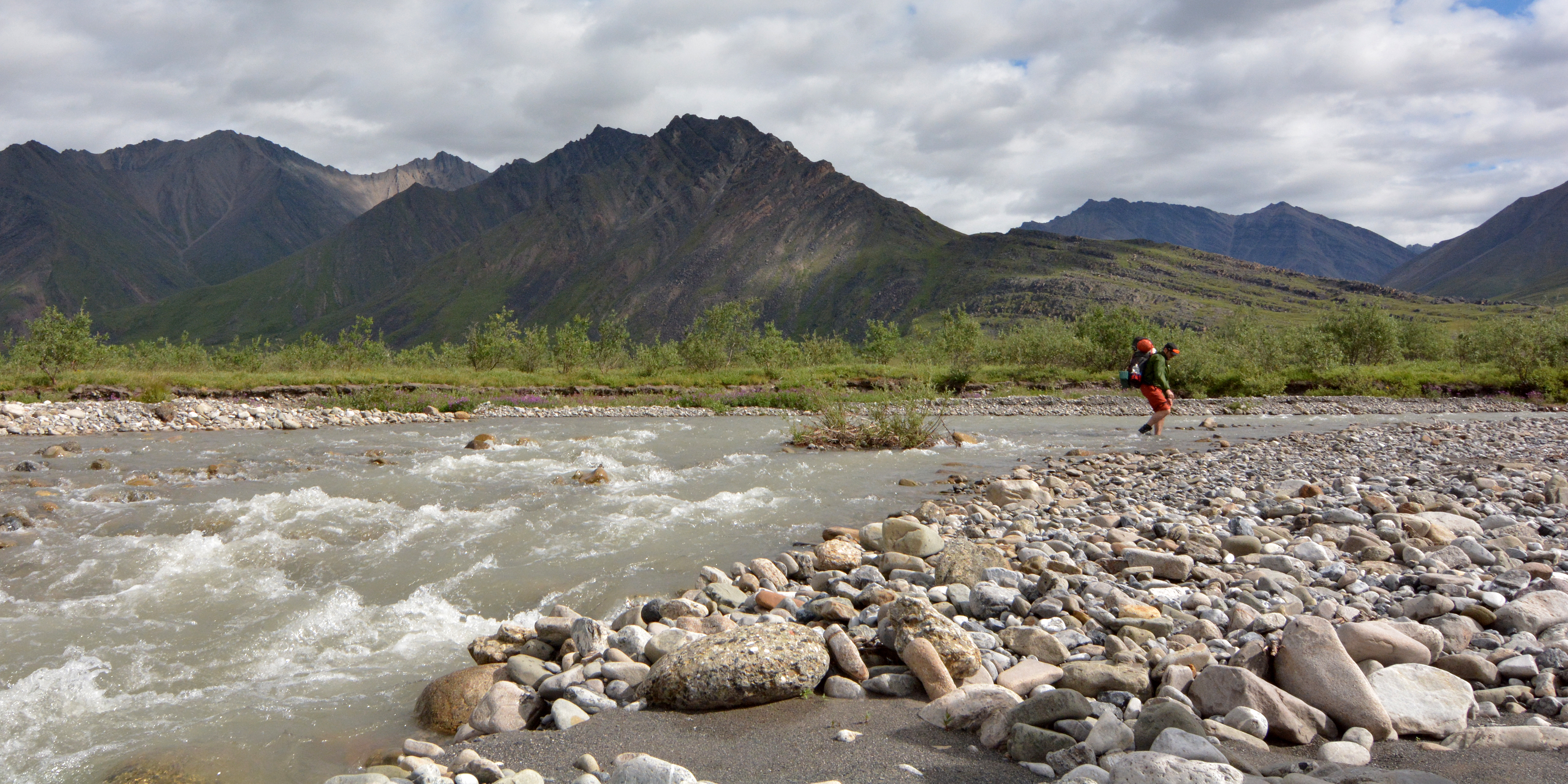

- Location of the mouth of the Itkillik River in Alaska

Location
- Country: United States
- State: Alaska
- Borough: North Slope

Physical characteristics
- Source: Endicott Mountains
  - location: Near Oolah Pass, Brooks Range
  - coordinates: 68°05′18″N 150°00′22″W
  - elevation: 5,276 ft (1,608 m)
- Mouth: Colville River
  - location: 25 miles (40 km) southwest of Harrison Bay on the Beaufort Sea
  - coordinates: 70°09′00″N 150°56′20″W
  - elevation: 7 ft (2.1 m)
- Length: 220 mi (350 km)

The Itkillik River is a 220-mile (350 km) tributary of the Colville River in the North Slope Borough of the U.S. state of Alaska. The river flows northeast then northwest out of the Endicott Mountains near Oohlah Pass to meet the larger stream about 25 miles (40 km) southwest of Harrison Bay on the Beaufort Sea. An Iñupiaq map, drawn in about 1900, identifies the river as It-kil-lik, meaning Indian.

A melting permafrost formation exposed along the Itkillik River is the largest known yedoma in Alaska. The formation, deposited between 50,000 and 10,000 years ago, contains remains of bison, muskoxen, mammoths, and other animals embedded in an ice cliff that is 100 feet (30 m) high and 1,200 feet (370 m) long. The ice is rich in methane. Odors emitted by the gasses released when the ice thaws have led to the site's nickname, the Stinking Hills or Stinky Bluffs.

== See also ==
- List of rivers of Alaska
