= North Fork Koyukuk River =

Coordinates: 67°02′49″N 151°04′26″W

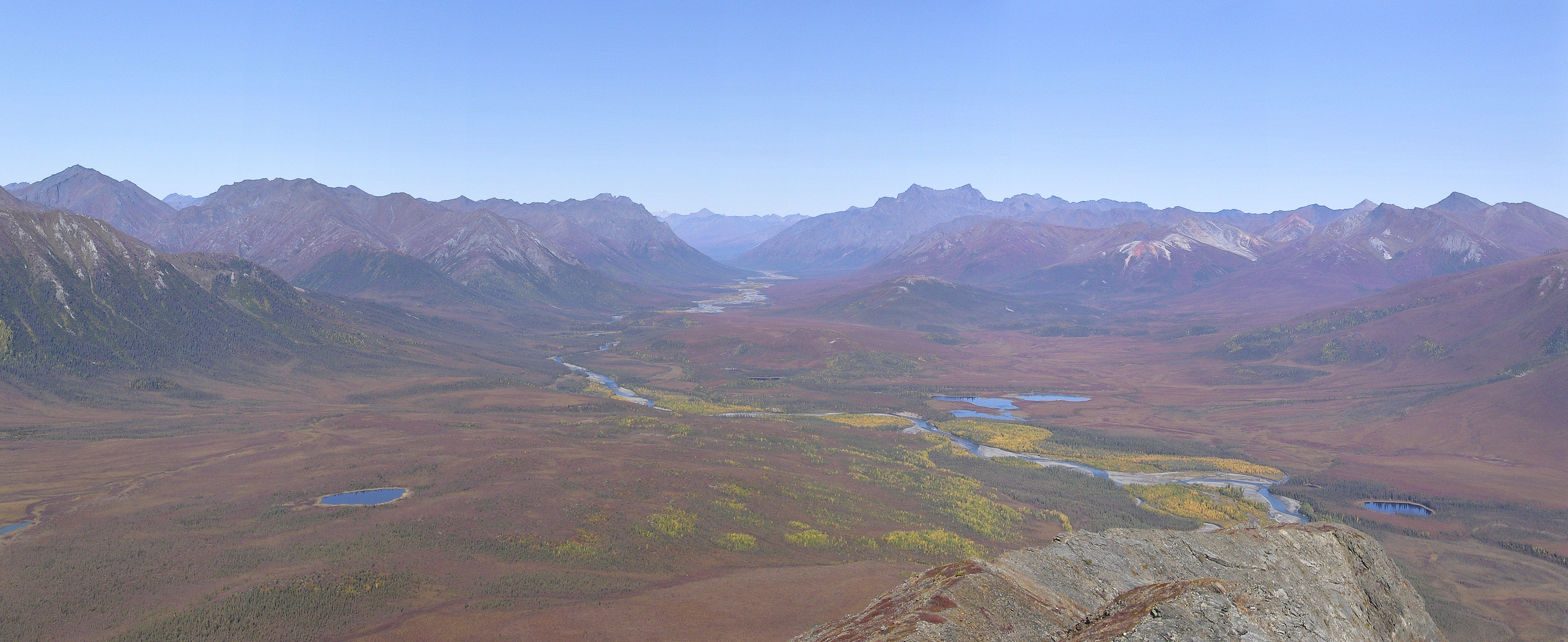
- North Fork Koyukuk River as it passes through The Gates of the Arctic

- Location within Alaska

National Wild and Scenic River
- Type: Wild
- Designated: December 2, 1980

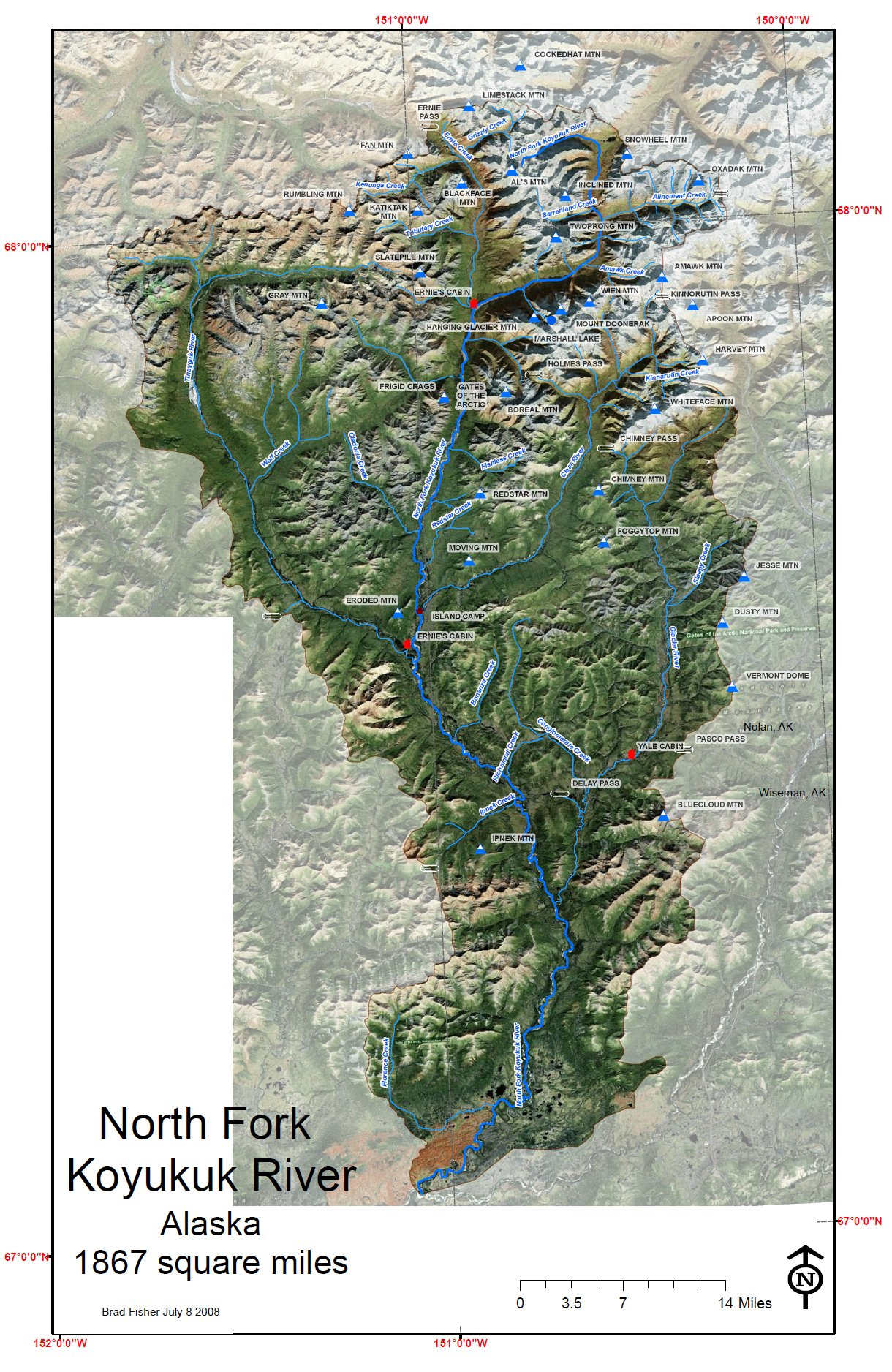
Watershed map of the North Fork Koyukuk River

The North Fork of the Koyukuk River is one of the principal forks of the Koyukuk River, approximately 105 mi (160 km) long, in northern Alaska in the United States. It has a watershed area of 1,850 square miles (4,800 km^{2}). It rises on the south slopes of the Continental Divide in the Brooks Range.

It is located in the Gates of the Arctic National Park and Preserve and is part of the Koyukuk Wild and Scenic River as designated by the United States Congress in 1980.

The major tributaries include the Glacier River, Tinayguk River, Clear River and joins the Middle Fork Koyukuk River to form the Koyukuk main stem.

Robert Marshall thoroughly explored the system in 1929, naming many of the major peaks such as Mount Doonerak, Frigid Crags, and Boreal Mountain, the later two forming the Gates of the Arctic.

== See also ==
- List of rivers of Alaska
- List of National Wild and Scenic Rivers
