= Mount Doonerak =

Mountain in Alaska, United States

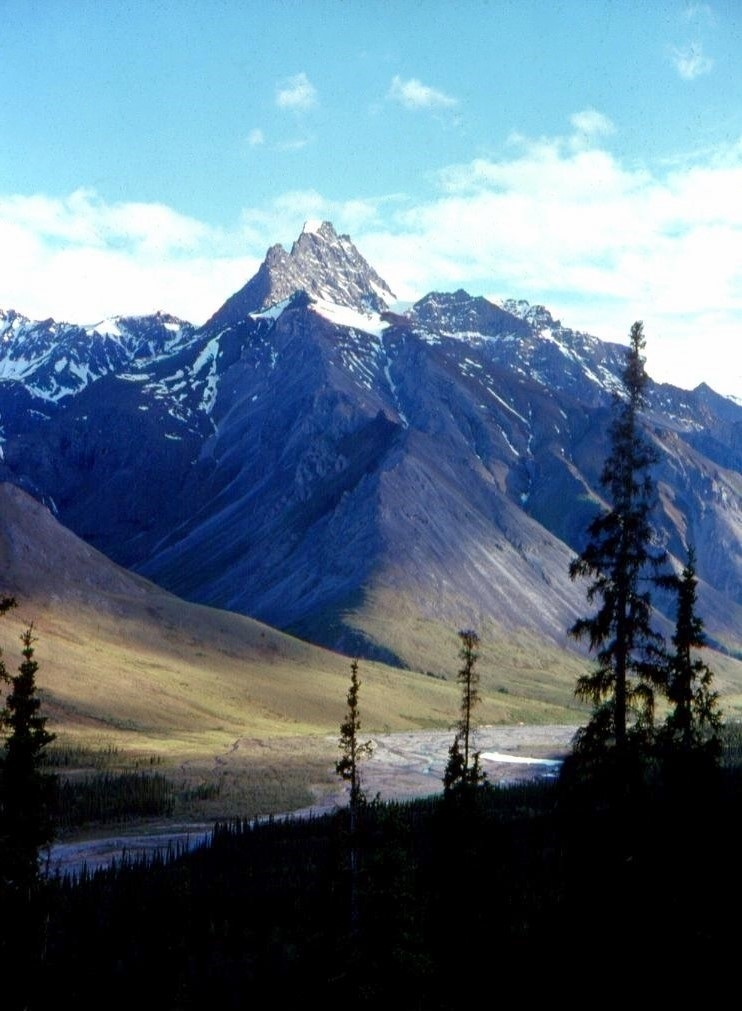
- Northeast aspect

Highest point
- Elevation: 7,457 ft (2,273 m)
- Prominence: 3,557 ft (1,084 m)
- Parent peak: Peak 7510
- Isolation: 27.19 mi (43.76 km)
- Coordinates: 67°54′17″N 150°37′38″W

Geography
- Location within Alaska
- Interactive map of Mount Doonerak
- Country: United States
- State: Alaska
- Census Area: Yukon–Koyukuk
- Protected area: Gates of the Arctic National Park and Preserve
- Parent range: Endicott Mountains; Brooks Range
- Topo map: USGS Wiseman D-2

Geology
- Rock age: Paleozoic
- Rock type(s): Metavolcanic rock and argillite

Climbing
- First ascent: 1952
- Easiest route: Southeast Ridge class 4

Mount Doonerak is a 7,457-foot-elevation (2,273-meter) mountain summit in Alaska, United States.

== Description ==
Mount Doonerak is the third-highest point in the Endicott Mountains which are a subrange of the Brooks Range. It is set 32 miles (51 km) southeast of Anaktuvuk Pass in Gates of the Arctic National Park and Preserve. It ranks as the fourth-highest summit within the park, and is one of the most popular climbing areas in the park. Precipitation runoff from the mountain drains north into the North Fork Koyukuk River. Topographic relief is significant as the summit rises approximately 5,457 feet (1,663 meters) above the North Fork Koyukuk in two miles (3.2 km). The nearest city is Fairbanks, 225 miles (362 km) to the south-southeast.

== History ==
The mountain was discovered and named in 1929 by Bob Marshall who called it "Matterhorn of the Koyukuk." Later, he renamed it Doonerak after miscalculating the elevation as more than 10,000 feet and believing it was the tallest peak in the Arctic of Alaska. Marshall described the mountain as, a "towering, black, unscalable-looking giant, the highest peak in this section of the Brooks Range." The name Doonerak is taken from an Iñupiat word which means "a spirit" or "a devil." The mountain's toponym was officially adopted in 1932 by the United States Board on Geographic Names.

The first ascent of the summit was made on June 30, 1952, by George W. Beadle, Alfred Tissières and Gunnar Bergman via the Southeast Ridge.

== Climate ==
According to the Köppen climate classification system, Mount Doonerak is located in a tundra climate zone with cold, snowy winters, and cool summers. Winter temperatures can drop below −20 °F with wind chill factors below −30 °F. This climate supports a small glacial remnant on the peak's north slope.

== See also ==
- List of mountain peaks of Alaska
- Geography of Alaska
