= Price Lake (Whatcom County, Washington) =

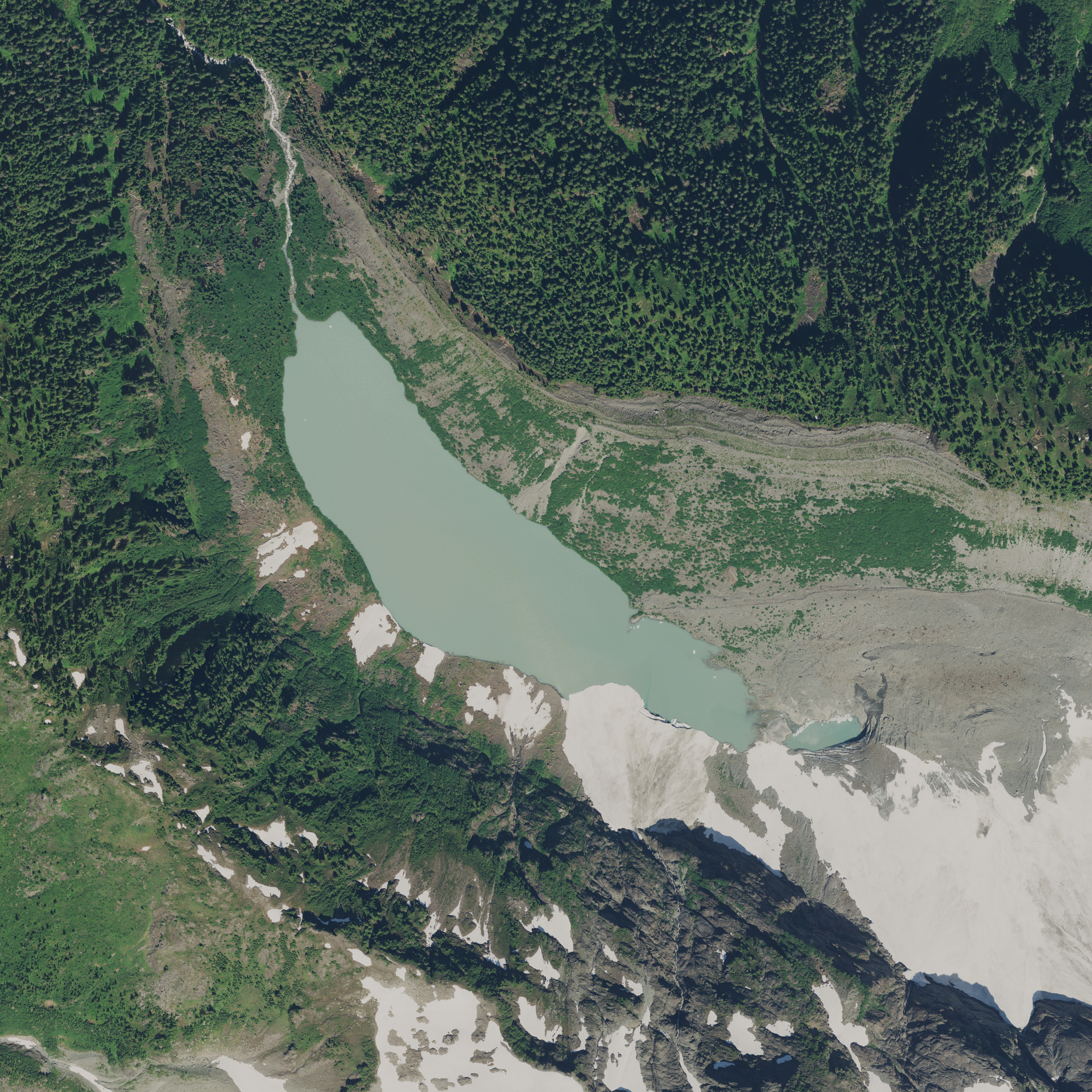
- Aerial shot of Price Lake in 2021
- Interactive map of Price Lake
- Location: North Cascades National Park, Whatcom County, Washington, United States
- Coordinates: 48°51′12″N 121°36′15″W
- Type: Proglacial lake
- Basin countries: United States
- Max. length: .65 mi (1.05 km)
- Max. width: .20 mi (0.32 km)
- Surface area: 40 acres (16 ha)
- Surface elevation: 3,914 ft (1,193 m)

Price Lake is located in North Cascades National Park, in the U. S. state of Washington. Price Lake was formed by the retreat of Price Glacier, which descends from the north slopes of Mount Shuksan. Price Glacier is broken into an upper and lower section and the lower section sometimes calves small icebergs into Price Lake.

Price Lake was named for Price Glacier, which was named by The Mountaineers for William M. Price, who climbed Mount Shuksan in 1906 and 1915.
