= Snafflehound =

Common name for various rodents

Snafflehounds are any of various rodents that inhabit the alpine zone, so called for gnawing on gear left at the base of an alpine climb. The sodium left on boots by the wearers' perspiration is their primary goal, but backpacks containing food detectable by smell may be raided, and numerous cases have also been reported of them gnawing holes in sleeping bags while climbers slept inside them. The term may have been first popularized by Fred Beckey.

"Snafflehound Spire" in The Bugaboos, and "Snafflehound Ledge" on the Beckey-Davis Route of Prusik Peak in The Enchantments refer to these animals.
