= Fred Beckey =

American rock climber and mountaineer

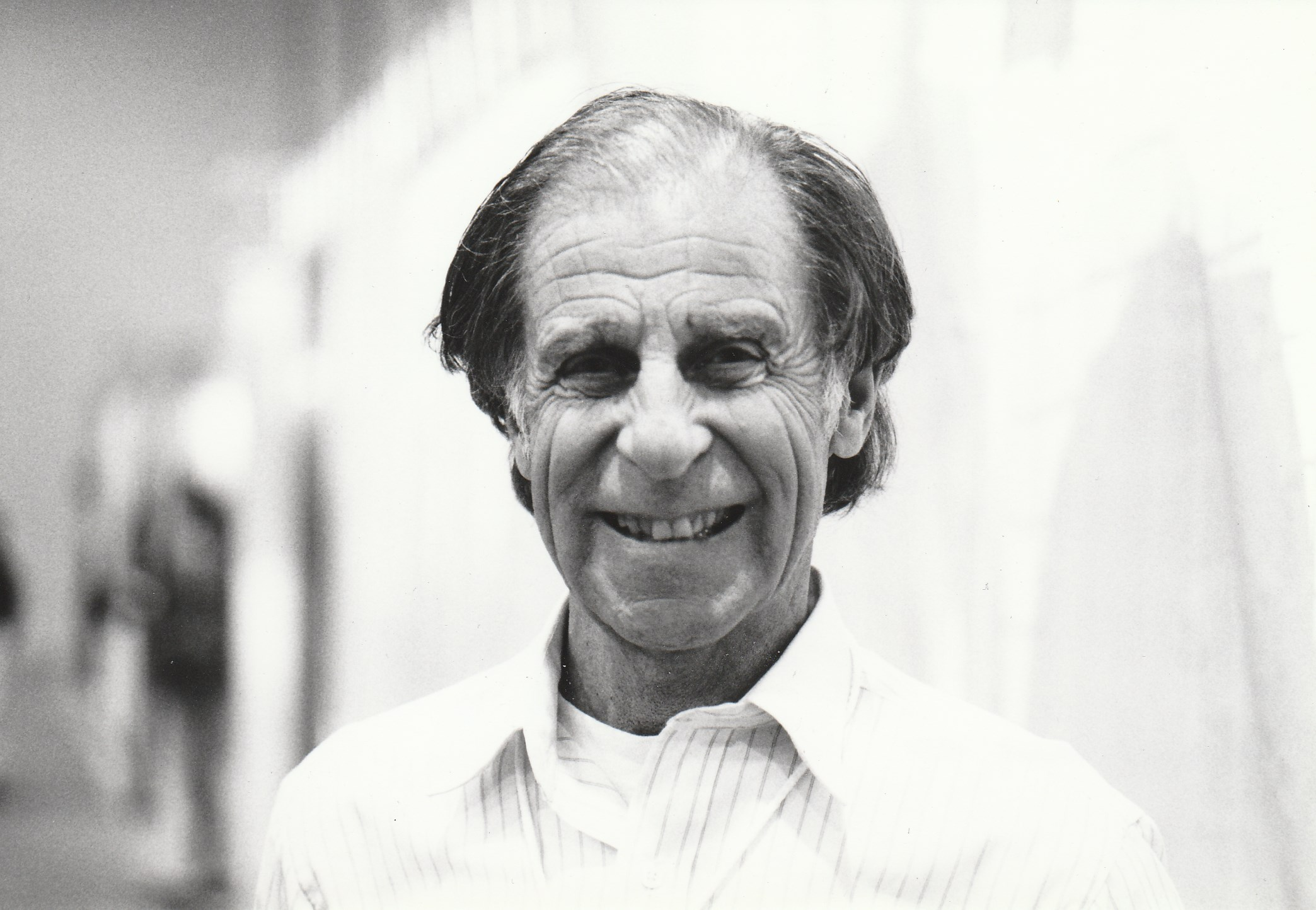
- Fred Beckey, circa 1990
- Born: Friedrich Wolfgang Beckey; 14 January 1923; Düsseldorf, Germany
- Died: 30 October 2017 (aged 94); Seattle, Washington, U.S.
- Education: University of Washington
- Occupations: Rock climber, mountaineer, guidebook author

Signature
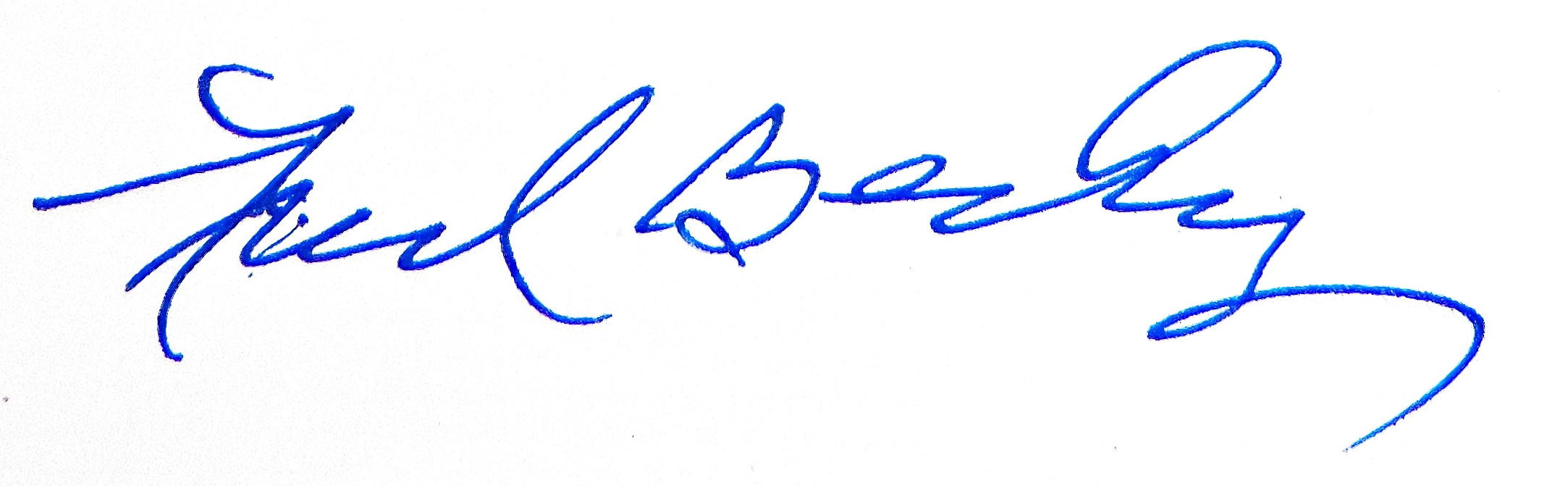

Friedrich Wolfgang Beckey (14 January 1923 – 30 October 2017), known as Fred Beckey, was an American rock climber, mountaineer and book author, who in seven decades of climbing achieved hundreds of first ascents of some of the tallest peaks and most important routes throughout Alaska, the Canadian Rockies and the Pacific Northwest. Among the Fifty Classic Climbs of North America, seven were established by Beckey, often climbing with some of the best known climbers of each generation.

== Early years ==
Beckey was born in 1923 near Düsseldorf, Germany to Klaus Beckey, a surgeon, and Marta Maria Beckey who was an opera singer. In 1925 economic hardships due to hyperinflation in the Weimar Republic forced his family to emigrate to the United States, settling in Seattle, Washington. His brother, Helmut "Helmy" Beckey, was born in Seattle in 1926 and would later become Fred's frequent climbing partner. At age twelve, Fred Beckey climbed Boulder Peak in the Cascades by himself, after wandering off on a family camping trip. Afterwards, his family signed him up with the Boy Scouts where he learned the basic concepts of climbing. Later he joined The Mountaineers. In 1939, at sixteen, Fred and two friends climbed 7,292-foot Mount Despair in the North Cascades, which was considered unclimbable at the time. In 1942, the teenage Beckey brothers snatched a second ascent of Mount Waddington, which was then considered the most difficult climb in North America. Beckey followed that with many more first ascents of summits in the Olympic and North Cascade ranges. In 1942 he joined 10th Mountain Division, based in Colorado, and served as an instructor.

After the war, Beckey studied business administration at the University of Washington, while still spending a lot of time climbing mountain ranges in the Northwest and desert rock formations in the Southwest. After graduation in 1949 he worked for the Seattle Post-Intelligencer and became a print shop sales representative. However, he soon discovered that his work interfered with his climbing. For a time, he worked as a delivery truck driver, which left him time for climbing. As time went on, he decided that climbing was his life's focus. He never married or had children, he never pursued a professional career, he never sought money or financial security as a goal—his goal was to climb mountains.

In 1955 Beckey joined the International Himalayan Expedition to climb the world’s fourth-highest peak, Lhotse. During the expedition his tentmate developed cerebral edema at 23,000 feet on the night before they were to attempt the summit. Beckey descended in a blizzard to get help, but was later blamed by his teammates for abandoning his partner, who was rescued by others. Consequently although Beckey seemed a likely choice as a member for first American Everest Expedition in 1963, he was never invited by his ex-teammates. Afterwards Beckey shied away from the large team efforts abroad, preferring smaller alpine-style undertakings alone or with a few companions seeking out America's last unclimbed peaks or striking routes considered too difficult to climb. He often climbed 40 or 50 different summits a year, and over the decades managed to achieve nearly one thousand first ascents.

== Guidebook author ==
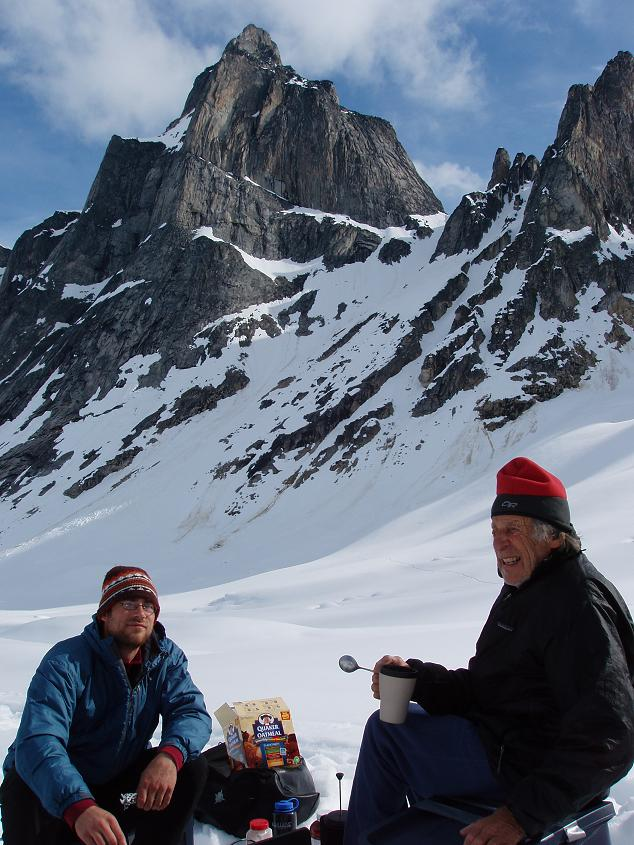
Fred Beckey (right) in Alaska, 2005

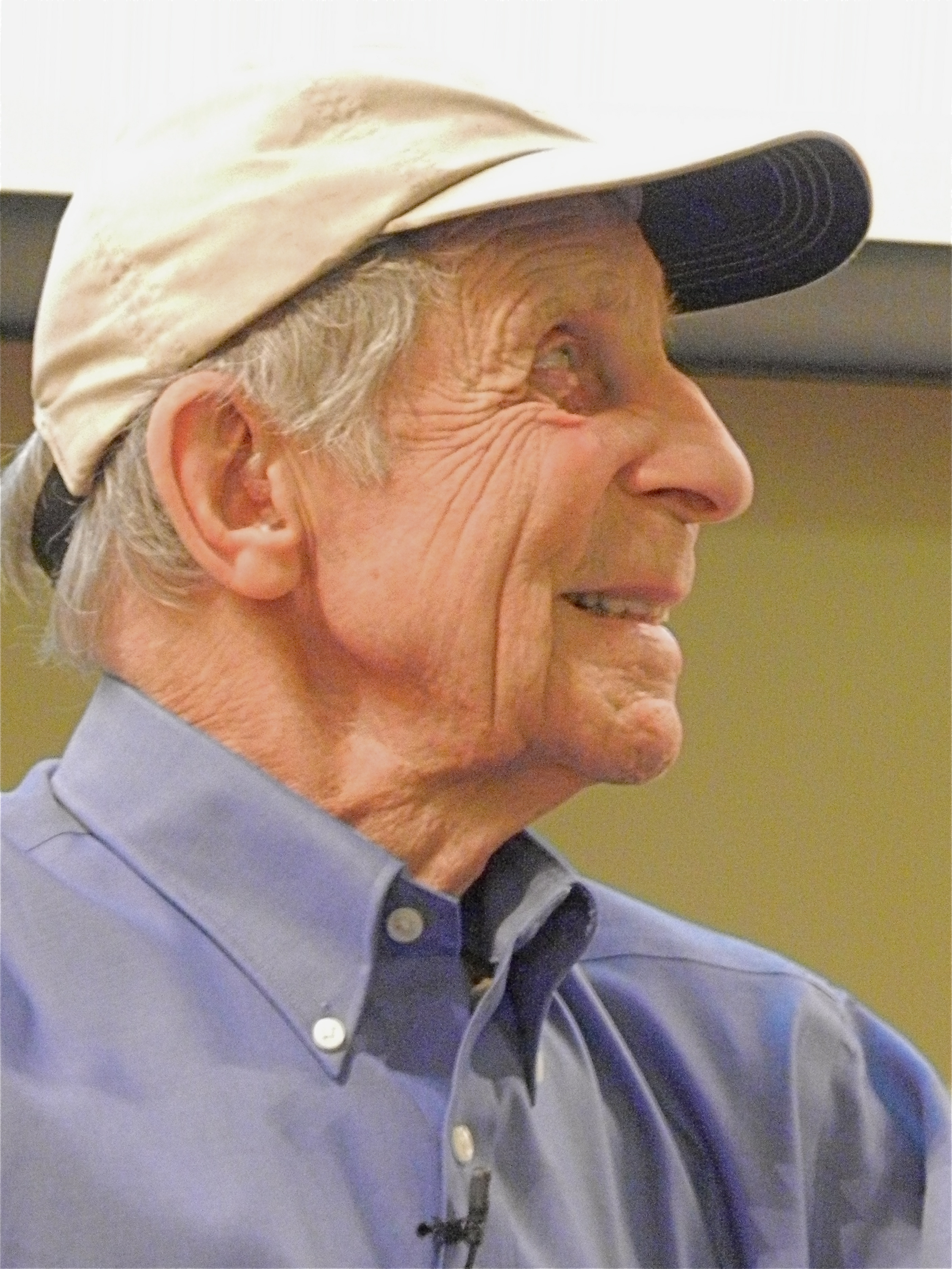
Fred Beckey in 2012

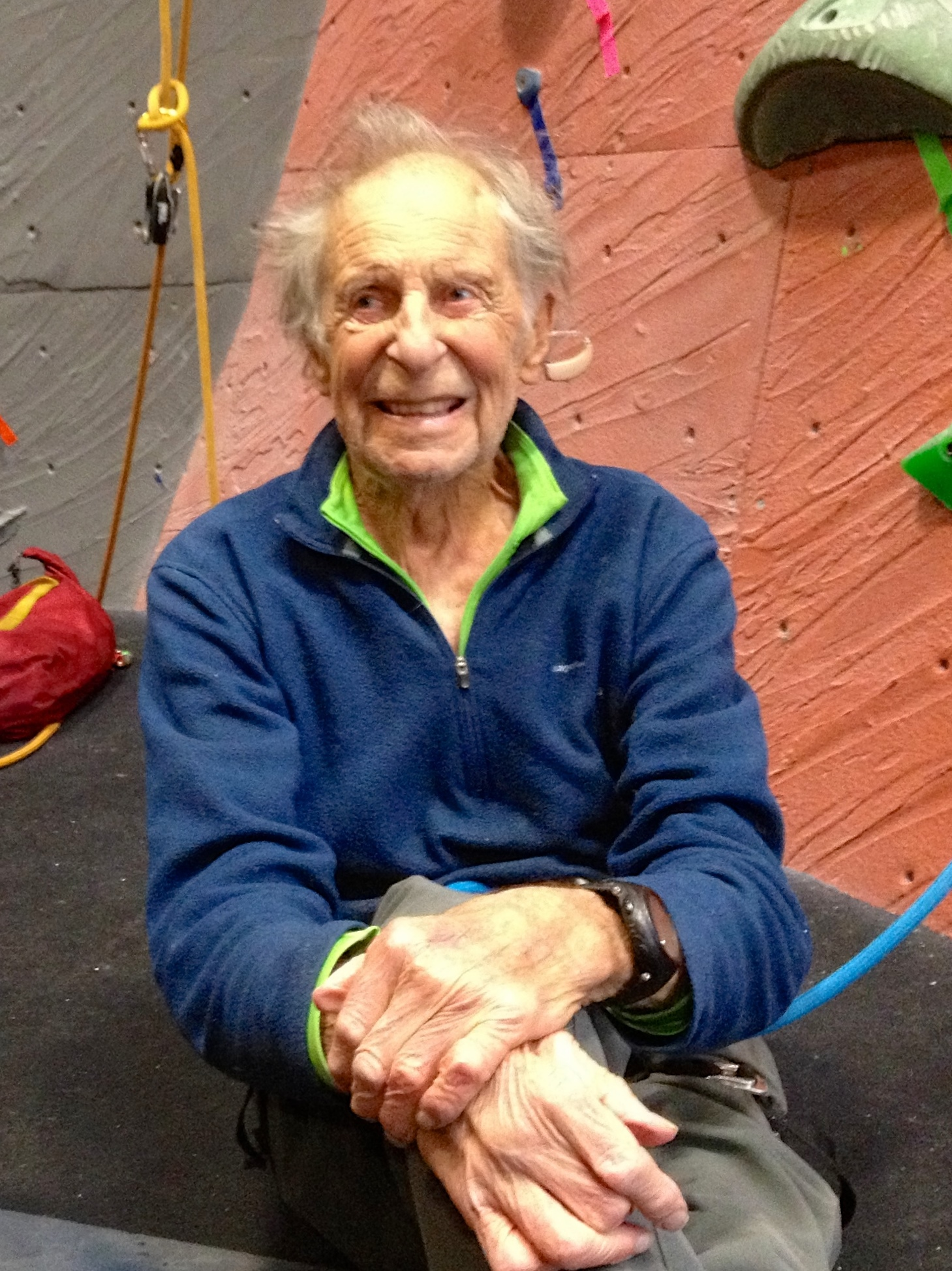
Fred Beckey in a climbing gym in 2014

In the late 1940s, he asked The Mountaineers of Seattle to publish his first climbing guidebook for the local peaks. They turned him down, and the American Alpine Club agreed to print a few thousand copies for a flat fee. Between climbs, he wrote several books, most notably the Cascade Alpine Guide, the definitive three-volume description of the Cascades from the Columbia River to the Fraser River, now in its third edition, published by The Mountaineers.

== Later accomplishments ==
In 2003, his 563-page book on the history of the region, Range of Glaciers, was published by the Oregon Historical Society Press. According to a reviewer, he did much of the research for the volume in Washington, D.C., at the Library of Congress and the National Archives, scouring files of the State Department, U.S. Geological Survey and other agencies. Beckey also perused the Canadian archives in Ottawa, Ontario; Hudson's Bay Co. archives in Winnipeg, Manitoba; British Columbia archives in Victoria, British Columbia; records of the Northwest Boundary Survey at Yale University; and records of the Northern Pacific and Great Northern railroads in Minneapolis.

Beckey continued climbing when over 90 years old. His life was the subject of a 2017 documentary, directed by David O'Leske and produced by Patagonia, called Dirtbag: The Legend of Fred Beckey. The film won over 26 international awards, including: the Best Feature Mountain Film at the 2017 Banff Mountain Film Festival; the Best Mountaineering Film at the 2017 Kendal Mountain Film Festival; and, the People's Choice Award at the 2017 Banff Mountain Book Festival.

Mount Beckey, a previously unnamed, 8,500-foot peak in remote West-Central Alaska Range (62°51′20″N 152°8′15″W), was named after Beckey, after he, Calvin Hebert and John Middendorf climbed it in 1996.

== Death ==
Fred Beckey died of congestive heart failure, in Seattle, on October 30, 2017 at the age of 94.

== First ascents ==
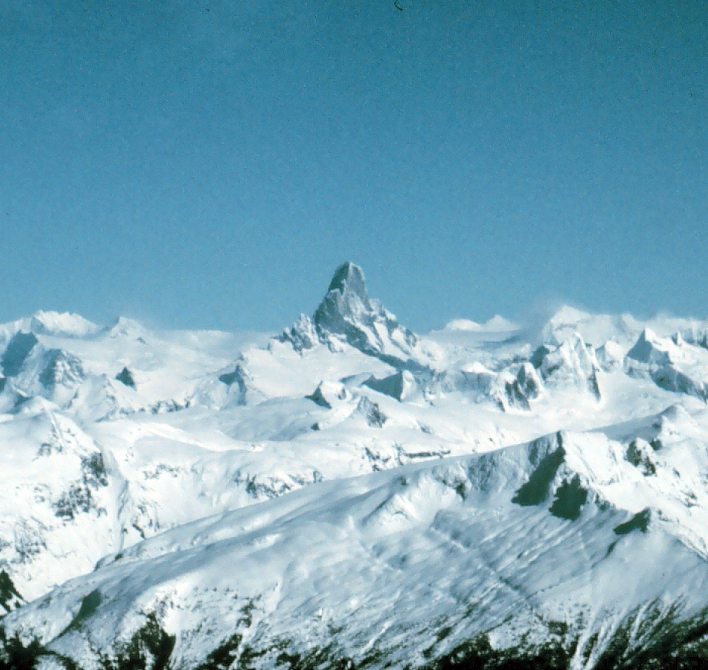
Devils Thumb, Alaska

Partial list of notable first ascents:

- 1939 Mount Despair, North Cascades
- 1940 Forbidden Peak, North Cascades - with brother Helmy, Lloyd Anderson, Jim Crooks, and Dave Lind.
- 1945 Price Glacier, Mount Shuksan, North Cascades with Jack Schwabland and Bill Granston
- 1946 East Ridge Devils Thumb, Alaska with Bob Craig and Clifford Schmidtke (Aug 25)
- 1946 Liberty Bell, North Cascades, Washington
- 1947 Mount Hozomeen's South Peak
- 1947 North Peak, Liberty Bell, North Cascades - 1947
- 1948 North Ridge of Mount Baker, North Cascades Fred Beckey, Ralph and Dick Widrig (August 1948)
- 1948 Prusik Peak, North Cascades with Art Holben
- 1954 Northwest Buttress to North Peak, Denali, Alaska (May 27) with Donald McLean, Charles Wilson, Henry Meybohm and Bill Hackett.
- 1954 South Ridge, Mount Deborah with Heinrich Harrer and Henry Meybohm
- 1954 West Ridge Mount Hunter (Alaska) - with Heinrich Harrer and Henry Meybohm
- 1959 Crescent Arete, Mount Owen, Tetons, with Yvon Chouinard
- 1959 Yocum Ridge, Mount Hood, Oregon, with Leo Scheiblehner
- 1960 Outer Space, Leavenworth, Washington with Ron Niccoli
- 1961 North Face of Mount Edith Cavell, Canadian Rockies, Canada with Yvon Chouinard and Dan Doody
- 1961 North Face, Mount Sir Donald, Rogers Pass, British Columbia with Yvon Chouinard
- 1961 Beckey-Chouinard Route on South Howser Tower, Bugaboos, Canada with Yvon Chouinard
- 1961 The Priest, Castle Valley, Utah, with Layton Kor, Harvey Carter, and Annie Carter
- 1962 Question Mark Wall, Lone Peak Cirque, Wasatch Range, Utah
- 1963 Complete North Ridge, Mount Stuart, North Cascades, Washington with Steve Marts
- 1963 Northeast Buttress of Mount Slesse, British Columbia, Canada with Steve Marts and Eric Bjornstad
- 1963 West Buttress (IV 5.8 A1), Musembeah Peak, Wind River Range, Wyoming (September) with Layton Kor
- 1963 Beckey Route, Elephant's Perch, Sawtooth Mountains, Idaho
- 1964 Angel's Crest, The Chief, Squamish, British Columbia
- 1965 Mount Sir Donald, Rogers Pass, British Columbia, First Winter Ascent
- 1966 Mount Seattle, Saint Elias Mountains, Alaska
- 1967 El Matador (NCCS IV, A3), Devils Tower, Wyoming. FA with Eric Bjornstad
- 1968 Direct East Buttress (IV F8 A4), South Early Winter Spire, North Cascades, Washington. FA with Doug Leen
- 1968 South Face (III F8 A1), Cathedral Peak (Washington), North Cascades, Washington. FA with Dave Wagner, John Brottem and Doug Leen
- 1968 Northeast Face, Mount Hooker, Canadian Rockies, Canada. FA with John Rupley
- 1970 Beckey's Spire aka Christianity Spire, Sedona Arizona
- 1970, 1972 Zeus and Moses, Utah. FAs with Eric Bjornstad
- 1970 South Face of Charlotte Dome, III 5.7, FA with Galen Rowell, Chris Jones
- 1972 Moses, Canyonlands with Eric Bjornstad
- 1972 The Tusk, Alaska
- 1976 Mount Emmerich, Alaska
- 1989 South Buttress, Caliban Peak, Arrigetch Peaks, Alaska
- 1996 Mount Beckey, Cathedral Mountains, Alaska, with John Middendorf and Calvin Hebert
- 1997 Bomber Lake Arete, Wind River Range, Wyoming with Cameron Burns

== Other notable ascents ==
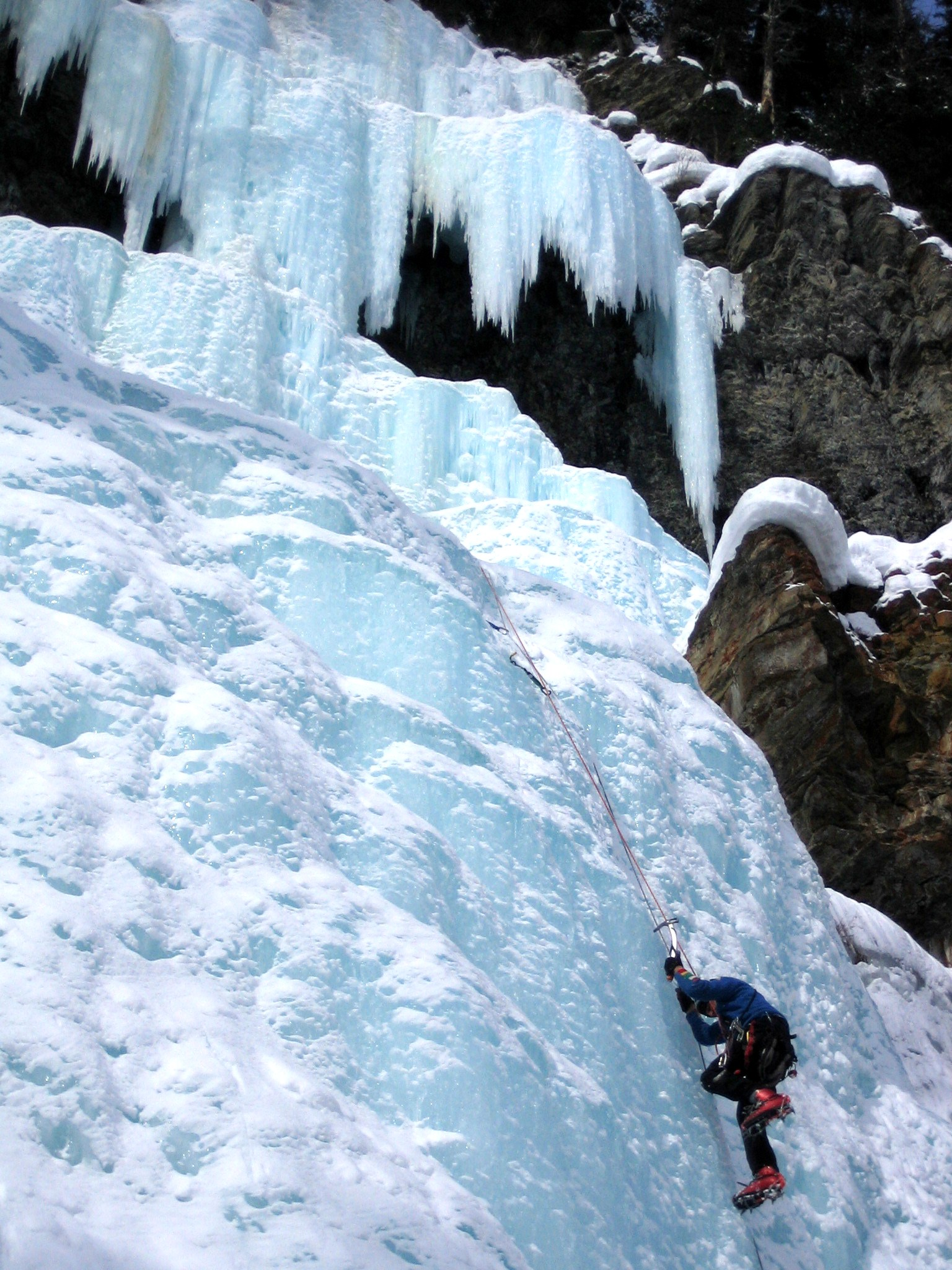
Fred Beckey on Louise Falls in 2006

- Second ascent Mount Waddington, British Columbia - 1942
- Triple ascent of Denali, Mount Deborah, and Mount Hunter - 1954
- 1989 South Face of Kedernath, India. Beckey is part of an expedition that makes a very close attempt.

== Personality ==
Timothy Egan captures Fred Beckey's personality in a chapter of The Good Rain. Beckey named Vasiliki Ridge, by Washington Pass, after his one true love. Beckey was a quintessential dirtbag climber, well captured by a classic portrait of him by Corey Rich from 2004 Patagonia's Fall catalog, where he is trying to hitchhike while holding a sign "Will belay for food". His reputation is well known among many climbers, captured in a T-shirt "Beware of Beckey: He will steal your woman, steal your route."

== Books ==
- Fred Beckey's 100 Favorite North American Climbs (Patagonia Inc., 2011, ISBN 978-0-9801227-1-8)
- Range of Glaciers: The Exploration and Survey of the Northern Cascade Range (Oregon Historical Society, 2003 ISBN 0-87595-243-7)
- Cascade Alpine Guide (3 vols.) (Mountaineers Books, 1973–2008)
  - Columbia River to Stevens Pass (1973, 3rd ed. 2000, ISBN 0-89886-577-8)
  - Stevens Pass to Rainy Pass (1977, 3rd ed. 2003, ISBN 0-89886-152-7)
  - Rainy Pass to Fraser River (1981, 3rd ed. 2008, ISBN 0-89886-423-2)
- Challenge of the North Cascades (1969, 2nd ed. 1996, ISBN 0-89886-479-8)
- Mount McKinley: Icy Crown of North America (Mountaineers Books 1993, paper 1999, ISBN 0-89886-646-4)
- The Bugaboos: An Alpine History (1987) (Introduction Only)
- Mountains of North America (1986)
- Mountains of North America (Sierra Club, 1982)
- Darrington and Index Rock Climbing Guide (Mountaineers Books, 1976)
- Guide to Leavenworth rock-climbing areas (Mountaineers Books, 1965)
- Climber's Guide to the Cascade and Olympic Mountains of Washington (American Alpine Club, 1949, revised edition 1953)

== See also ==
- Snafflehound
