= Helpmejack Creek =

River tributary in Alaska, the United States

Coordinates: 66°57′N 153°26′W

Helpmejack Creek is a stream in Yukon–Koyukuk Census Area, Alaska, in the United States. It is a tributary of the Alatna River.

== History ==
The name Helpmejack recalls the plea for help of someone who was stuck in the creek. A member of the United States Geological Survey officially recorded the old prospectors' name in 1902.

== See also ==
- List of rivers of Alaska
