= Alatna River =

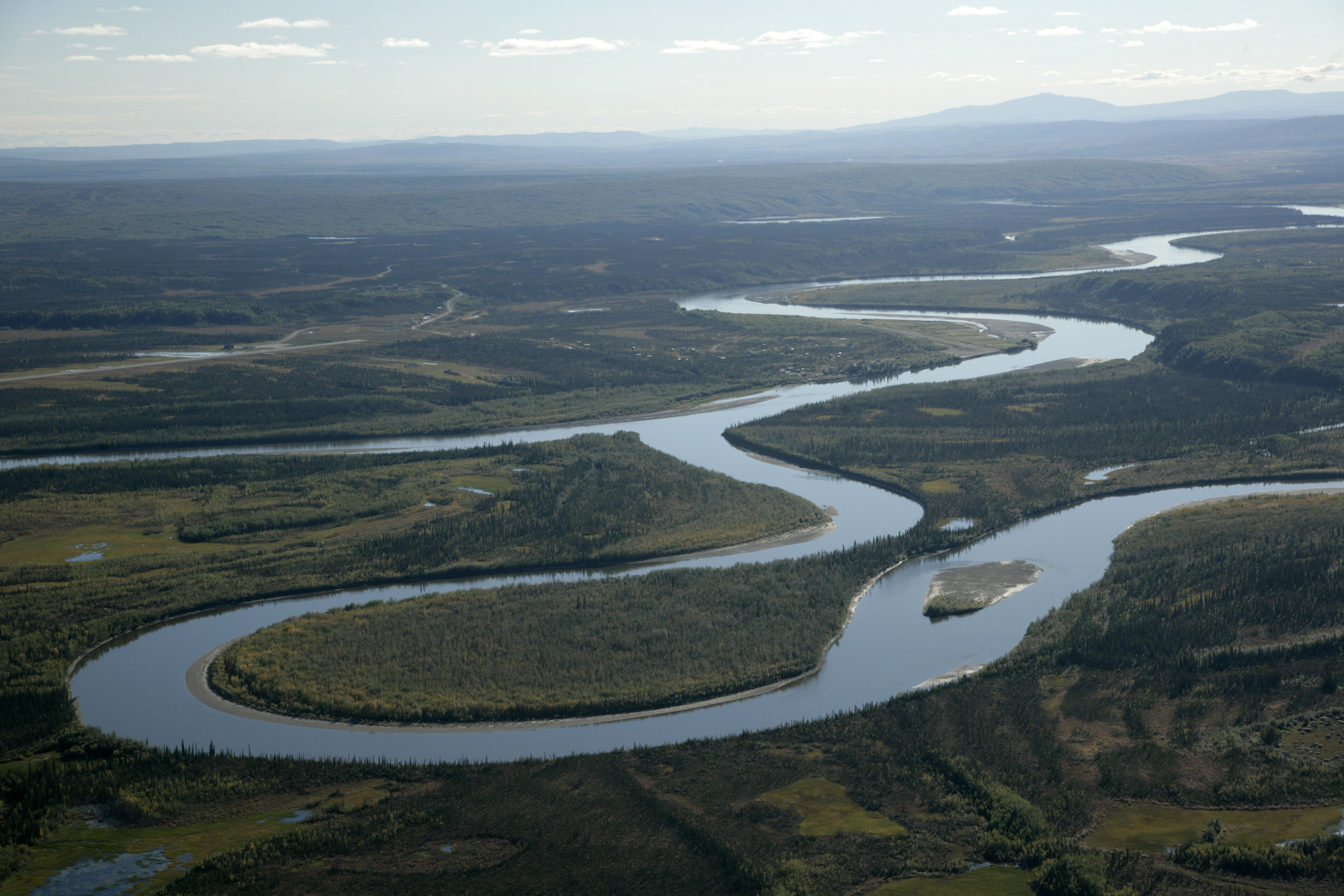
- Confluence of Alatna and Koyukuk Rivers

- Location within Alaska

Location
- Country: United States
- State: Alaska

Basin features
- Tributaries
  - right: Helpmejack Creek

National Wild and Scenic River
- Type: Wild
- Designated: December 2, 1980

The Alatna River is a federally designated wild and scenic river partially contained within the boundaries of Gates of the Arctic National Park, Alaska.

== Geography ==
The Alatna River stems from the central Brooks Range flowing through the Endicott Mountains, passing Circle Lake, the Arrigetch Peaks and Takahula Lake before entering the Helpmejack Hills. The last section of the river continues to flow in a SSE direction through the Alatna Hills into its confluence with the Koyukuk River near the small village of Allakaket. The first 25 miles (40 km) of the Alatna are shallow and rocky, followed by 15 miles (24 km) of a continued shallow area with more rapids. The river then mellows out near Takahula and Circle Lake becoming deeper and more meandering while the scenery turns from mountain peaks into hilly boreal forest. According to The Alaska River Guide, this river is 184 miles (296 km) long from the headwaters to Allakaket and 137 miles (220 km) from Circle Lake to Allakaket.

== Tourism ==
The river is very popular for float trips due to its calm flow and wonderful scenery. Float trips usually take from four to fourteen days, depending on put-in spot and pick-up spot, and also weather/river conditions. One common place to put in is Circle Lake, a small lake which is float plane accessible and is located in a beautiful part of the valley. Another place to put in is Takahula Lake, a larger, float-plane accessible lake, further downstream from Circle Lake. Gaedeke Lake is also a possible put in spot, but according to the Alaska River Guide, this upstream section near the headwaters of the river is shallow and rocky making portaging or lining necessary. Most floaters take out at the village of Allakaket.

== Exploration ==
Bob Marshall made an exploratory mapping trip up the river in 1931, following the river drainage from Allakaket upstream, to the Kutuk River, and onwards to the Brooks Range. He was following in the footsteps of Philip Smith in 1911, the Murie brothers Olas and Adolph in 1923, and the Smith, Fitzgerald, and Mertie USGS trip of 1924.
