= Johannesburg Mountain =

Mountain in Washington (state), United States

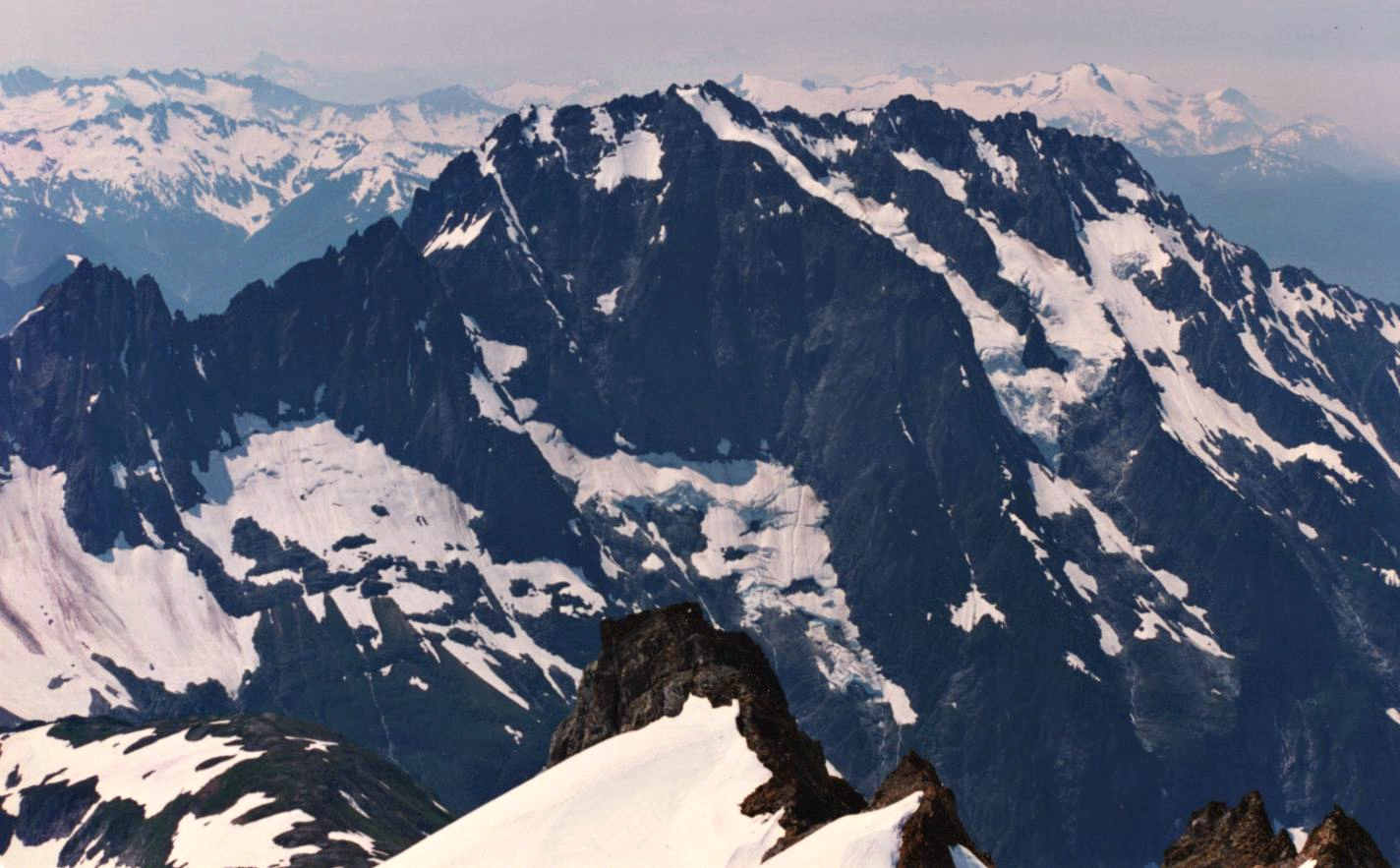
- Viewed from Sahale Mountain

Highest point
- Elevation: 8,200+ ft (2,500+ m) NGVD 29
- Prominence: 1,560 ft (480 m)
- Coordinates: 48°27′53″N 121°05′31″W

Geography
- Location: Skagit County, Washington, U.S.
- Parent range: North Cascades
- Topo map: USGS Cascade Pass (WA)

Climbing
- First ascent: 1938 by Calder Bressler, Bill Cox, Ray Clough, Tom Myers
- Easiest route: East Route (hike/scramble)

Johannesburg Mountain is one of the most famous peaks in the North Cascades of Washington state. Though not one of the top 100 peaks in the state by elevation, nor one of the top peaks as ranked by topographic prominence, Johannesburg is notable for its large, steep local relief, and particularly its immense, dramatic Northeast Face, which drops 5,000 feet (1,525 m) in only 0.9 miles (1.4 km).

The name "Johannesburg Mountain" comes, through an error, from "Johnsberg," the name of three mining claims on the north face of the peak. It has also been called "Elsbeth."

Johannesburg Mountain was first climbed on July 26, 1938, by Calder Bressler, Bill Cox, Ray W. Clough, and Tom Myers, via a version of the most popular route today, the East Ridge/Cascade-Johannesburg Couloir Route. This route, and others which also finish on the south side of the mountain, are mostly scrambling routes. However, there are many routes on the north and northeast faces which are highly technical and involve considerable objective danger from falling rock and ice.

== Climate ==
Johannesburg Mountain is located in the marine west coast climate zone of western North America. Most weather fronts originate in the Pacific Ocean, and travel northeast toward the Cascade Mountains. As fronts approach the North Cascades, they are forced upward by the peaks of the Cascade Range, causing them to drop their moisture in the form of rain or snowfall onto the Cascades (Orographic lift). As a result, the west side of the North Cascades experiences high precipitation, especially during the winter months in the form of snowfall. During winter months, weather is usually cloudy, but, due to high pressure systems over the Pacific Ocean that intensify during summer months, there is often little or no cloud cover during the summer. Because of maritime influence, snow tends to be wet and heavy, resulting in high avalanche danger.

== Geology ==
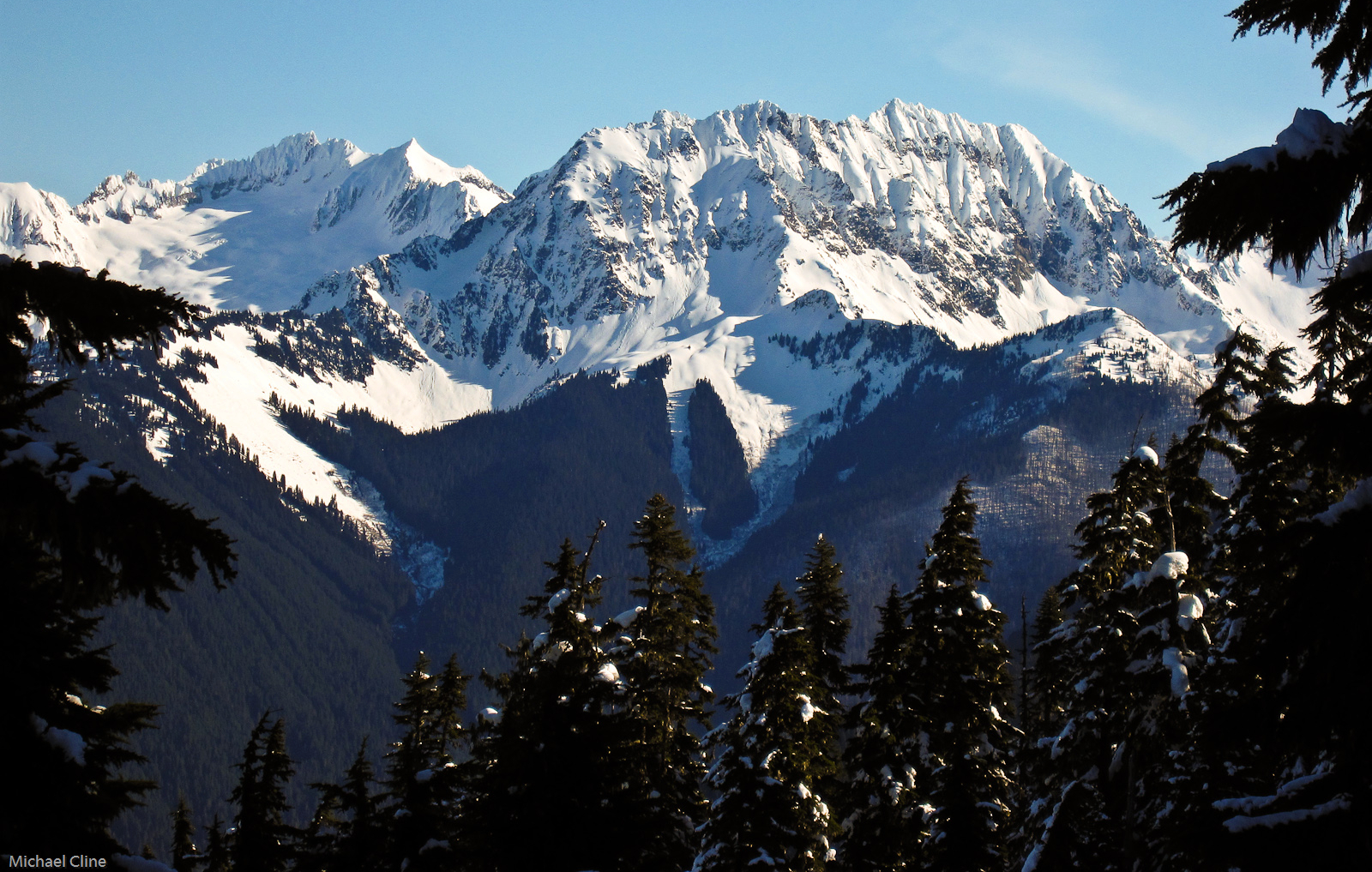
Johannesburg Mountain's southwest aspect

The North Cascades features some of the most rugged topography in the Cascade Range with craggy peaks and ridges, deep glacial valleys, and granite spires. Geological events occurring many years ago created the diverse topography and drastic elevation changes over the Cascade Range leading to the various climate differences. These climate differences lead to vegetation variety defining the ecoregions in this area.

The history of the formation of the Cascade Mountains dates back millions of years ago to the late Eocene Epoch. With the North American Plate overriding the Pacific Plate, episodes of volcanic igneous activity persisted. In addition, small fragments of the oceanic and continental lithosphere called terranes created the North Cascades about 50 million years ago.

During the Pleistocene period dating back over two million years ago, glaciation advancing and retreating repeatedly scoured the landscape leaving deposits of rock debris. The U-shaped cross section of the river valleys is a result of recent glaciation. Uplift and faulting in combination with glaciation have been the dominant processes which have created the tall peaks and deep valleys of the North Cascades area.
