= Price Glacier (Mount Shuksan) =

Glacier in the state of Washington

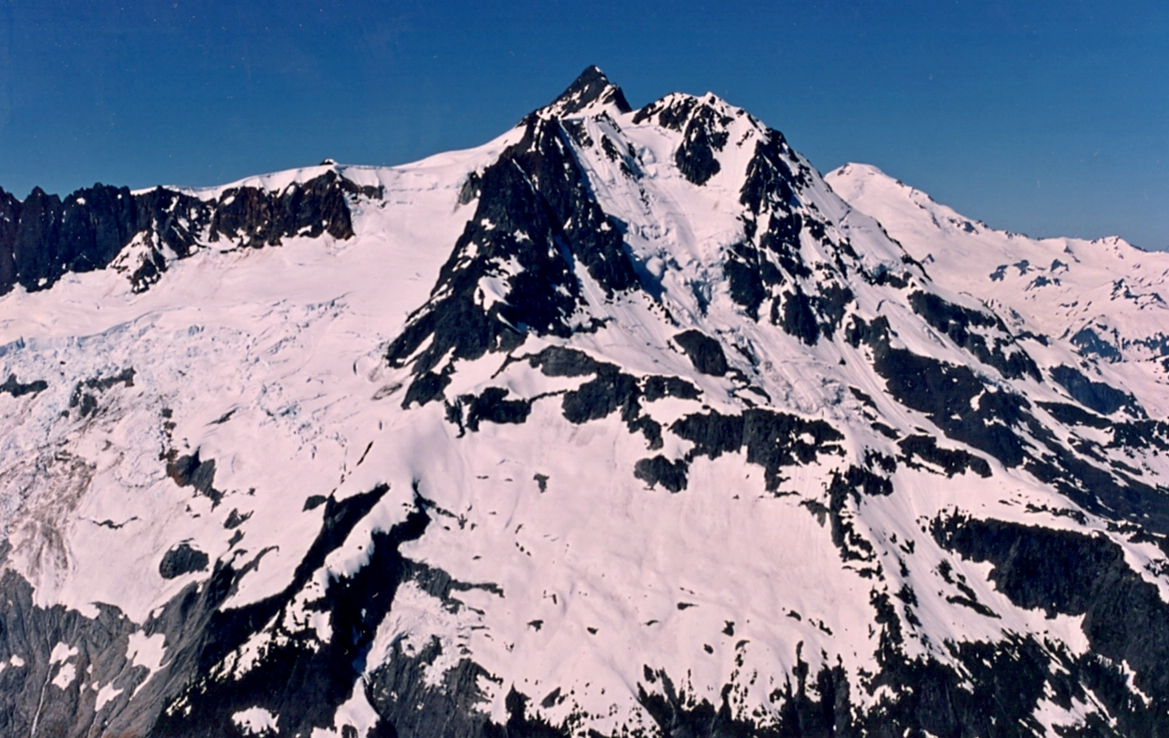
- Price Glacier seen below Shuksan's summit pyramid

- Location within Washington (state)
- Type: Mountain glacier
- Location: Whatcom County, Washington, U.S.
- Coordinates: 48°50′37″N 121°35′24″W
- Length: .75 mi (1.21 km)
- Terminus: Barren rock/icefall
- Status: Retreating

Price Glacier is in North Cascades National Park in the U.S. state of Washington, on the northeast slopes of Mount Shuksan, below the subpeak known as Nooksack Tower. Price Glacier descends from 8,600 to 4,200 ft (2,600 to 1,300 m) and is the steepest and most heavily crevasseed glacier on Mount Shuksan. The disconnected lowest portions of Price Glacier calve small icebergs into Price Lake.

Price Glacier was named by The Mountaineers for William M. Price, who climbed Mount Shuksan in 1906 and 1915.

== See also ==
- List of glaciers in the United States
