= Thibedeau Mountain =

Mountain in Alaska, United States

- Location within Alaska

Highest point
- Elevation: 2,298 m (7,539 ft)
- Coordinates: 68°17′05″N 150°05′37″W

Geography
- Location: Gates of the Arctic National Preserve, North Slope Borough, Alaska, United States

Thibedeau Mountain is a mountain in Gates of the Arctic National Preserve, Alaska, United States. It has an elevation of 2,298 meters (7,539 ft), and is named for the bush pilot Julius Thibedeau.
