= Endicott Mountains =

Mountain range in Alaska

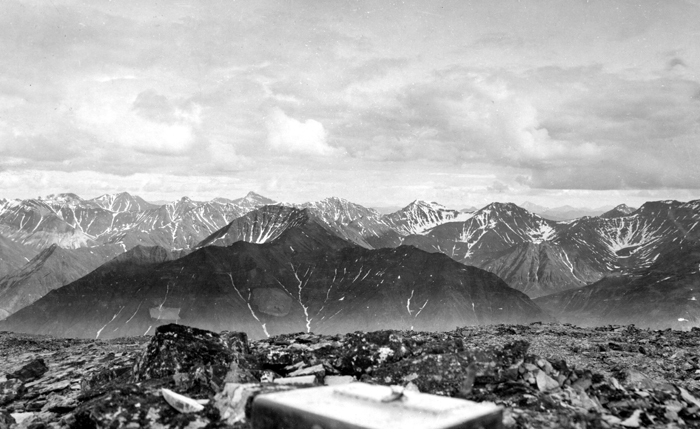
- Endicott Mountains looking south, 1901

Highest point
- Peak: Mount Kiev
- Elevation: 7,775 ft (2,370 m)
- Coordinates: 68°19′52″N 149°32′49″W

Dimensions
- Length: 151 mi (243 km) East-west
- Width: 70 mi (110 km) North-south

Geography
- Location: center of range
- Country: United States
- Region: Alaska
- Range coordinates: 68°22′N 152°18′W

The Endicott Mountains are a range of mountains, part of the Brooks Range in northern Alaska. They are located in the middle of the Brooks range and run some 151 miles (243 km) east–west. To the east are the Philip Smith Mountains and to the west are the Schwatka Mountains. The Endicott Mountains are separated from the Philip Smith Mountains by the Middle Fork of the Koyukuk River, the Dalton Highway, and Atigun Pass. The Endicott Mountains are separated from the Schwatka Mountains by Walker Lake, the upper reaches of the West Fork of the Kobuk River (Kaluluktok Creek), Akabluak Pass, and the Noatak River. The Endicott Mountains are separated from the mountains north of the Schwatka by Lucky Six Creek, Gull Pass, Gull Creek, a portion of the Alatna River and the Killik River.

From south to north the Endicott Mountains present long, broad glaciated valleys with rounded hills between rising in the center of the range to steep tors and aretes. The northern slopes of the Endicotts are steeper and more heavily incised, before they give way to the Arctic Coastal Plain.

== Peaks ==
Peaks in the Endicott Mountains include the Arrigetch Peaks, and highest to lowest:

- Mount Kiev at 7,775 feet (2,370 m)
- Thibedeau Mountain at 7,539 feet (2,298 m)
- Mount Doonerak at 7,457 feet (2,273 m)
- Cockedhat Mountain at 7,410 feet (2,259 m)
- Caliban at 7,181 feet (2,189 m)
- Xanadu at 7,160 feet (2,182 m)
- Fan Mountain at 7,090 feet (2,161 m)
- Dan Peak at 7,055 feet (2,150 m)
- Wichmann Tower at 6,916 feet (2,108 m)
- Mount MacVicar at 6,693 feet (2,040 m)
- Ariel Peak at 6,685 feet (2,038 m)
- Boreal Mountain at 6,654 feet (2,028 m)
- Mount Arthur Emmons at 6,556 feet (1,998 m)
- Rumbling Mountain at 6,510 feet (1,984 m)
- Iniakuk Peak at 6,490 feet (1,978 m)
- Mount Stuver at 6,286 feet (1,916 m)
- Mayukuit Mountain at 6,240 feet (1,902 m)
- Sillyasheen Mountain at 6,188 feet (1,886 m)
- Bluecloud Mountain at 5,903 feet (1,799 m)
- Gray Mountain at 5,783 feet (1,763 m)
- Sirr Mountain at 5,712 feet (1,741 m)
- Frigid Crags at 5,501 feet (1,677 m)
- Plateau Mountain at 5,322 feet (1,622 m)
- Natat Mountain at 5,141 feet (1,567 m)

as well as a number of unnamed peaks over 7000 ft.

== Geology ==
Above the crystalline basement PreCambrian and Paleozoic sediments that have undergone partial metamorphosis . Above these are middle Cambrian sediments and the well documented Kanayuk Conglomerate. The Kanayuk Conglomerate is a fluvial deposit, made by a river in its flood plain, and can be up to 8,000 feet (2,400 m) thick. The Kanayuk Conglomerate began to be deposited in the Devonian and continued through into the Mississippian (early Carboniferous). It is believed to have formed a huge delta almost 500 miles (800 km) long and 30 miles (48 km) wide.
