= Arrigetch Peaks =

Cluster of mountains in Alaska

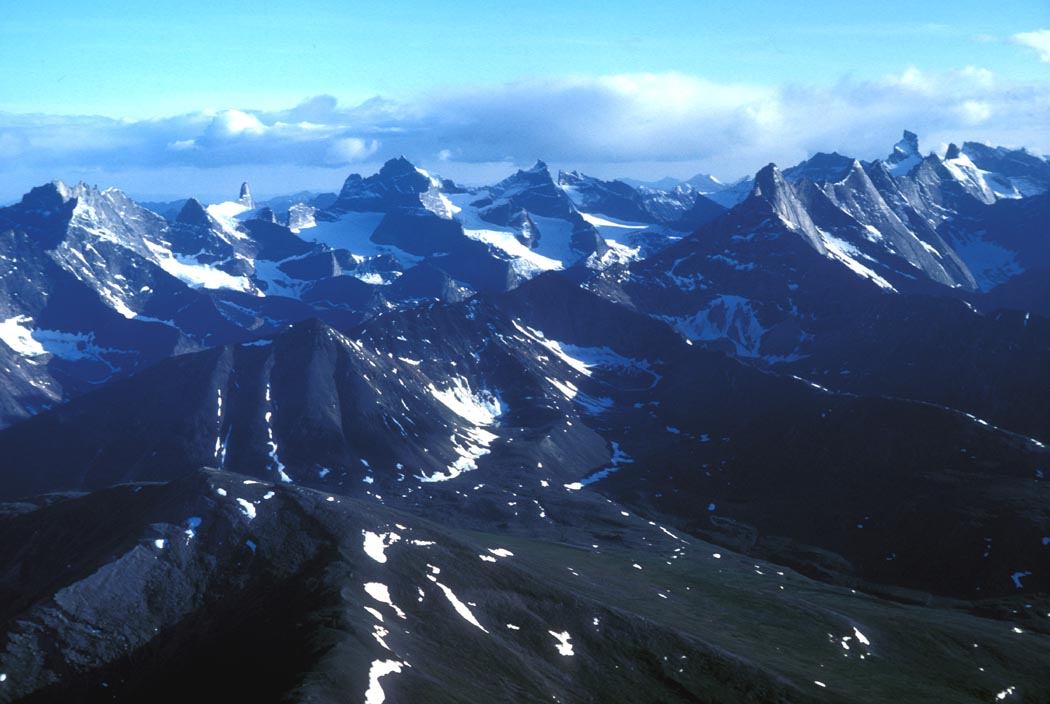

Dimensions
- Area: 103.42 km^{2} (39.93 mi^{2})

Geography
- Location within Alaska
- Country: United States
- State: Alaska
- Range coordinates: 67°25′N 154°11′W
- Arrigetch Peaks National Natural Landmark
- IUCN category III (natural monument or feature)
- Established: 1968

The Arrigetch Peaks (Iñupiaq: Argaich) are a cluster of rugged granite spires in the Endicott Mountains of the central Brooks Range in northern Alaska. The name Arrigetch means 'fingers of the outstretched hand' in the Inupiat language. The peaks ring the glacial cirques at the head of the Kobuk River and 2 tributaries of the Alatna River: Arrigetch Creek and Aiyagomahala Creek (Creek 4662). They are located at latitude 67 degrees 24' N and longitude 154 degrees 10' W. All of the summits of the peaks are around 6,000 ft, 1825 m elevation. The Arrigetch Peaks area was designated as a National Natural Landmark in 1968 for its spectacular geography.

The earliest recorded Geological Survey of the area was in 1911 by Philip S. Smith and H.M. Eakin. The renowned conservationist Robert Marshall explored the area in the 1930s. These trips were described in Marshall's 1933 book Arctic Village, and posthumous Alaska Wilderness: Exploring the Central Brooks Range. An American climbing party led by Brownell Bergen completed the first successful rock climbing expedition to the peaks in 1964. The peaks have been visited by a number of rock climbing expeditions since then.
