= Eric Bjornstad =

American climber and author

- Born: October 23, 1934; Phoenix, Arizona, U.S.
- Died: December 17, 2014 (aged 80); Moab, Utah, U.S.

Reginald Munger Sullivan "Eric" Bjornstad (1934–2014) was an American climber and author, and poet noted for his many climbs in the desert southwest as well as climbs in the Pacific Northwest and Alaska.

== Selected bibliography ==
1988. Desert Rock. Chockstone Press, Evergreen, CO. ISBN 0934641072.
