= Gates of the Arctic National Park and Preserve =

National park in Alaska, United States

- IUCN category V (protected landscape/seascape)
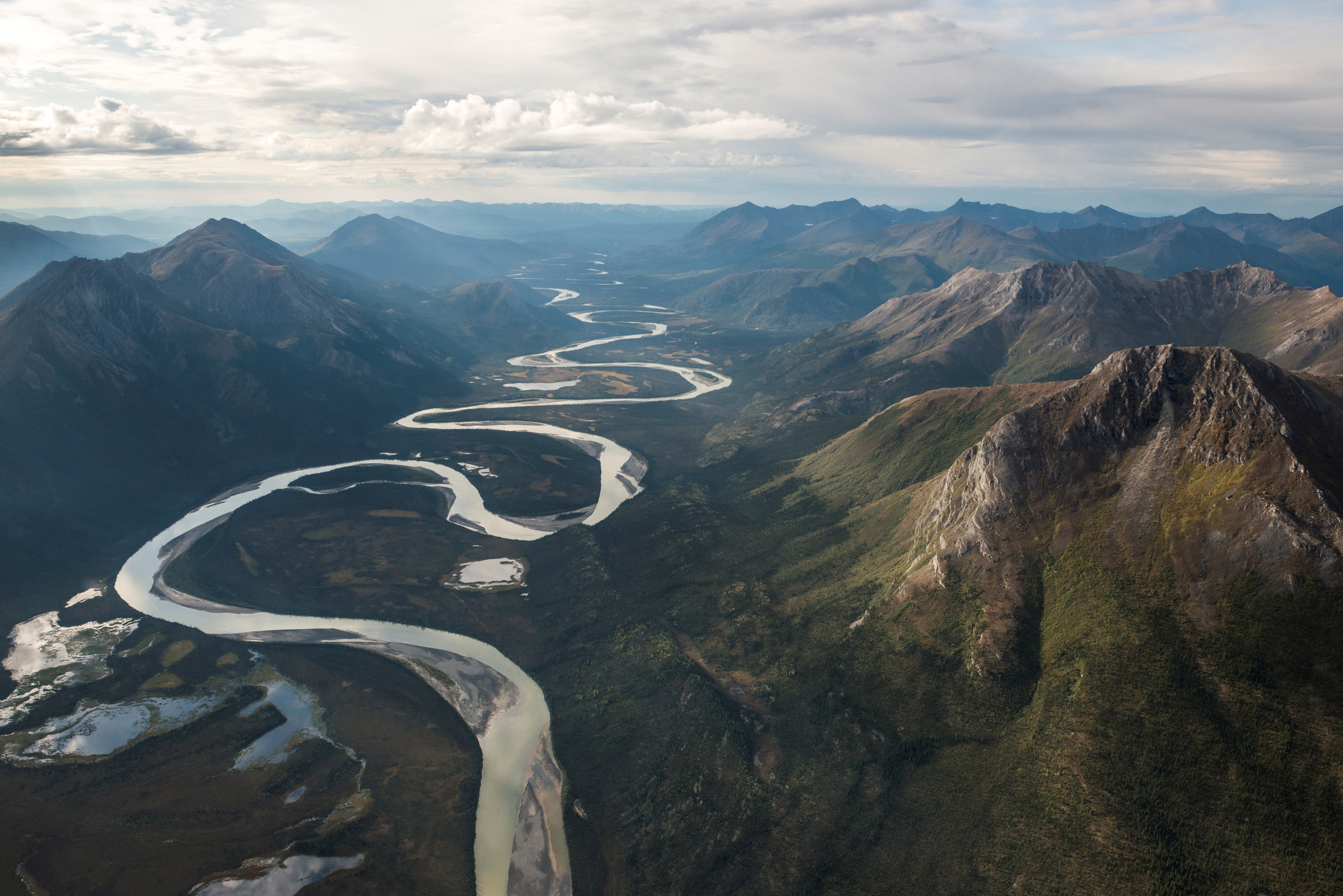
- Alatna river in the park
- Interactive map of Gates of the Arctic National Park and Preserve
- Location: Bettles, Alaska
- Coordinates: 67°47′N 153°18′W
- Area: 8,472,506 acres (34,287.02 km^{2})
- Established: December 2, 1980
- Visitors: 11,907 (in 2024)
- Governing body: National Park Service
- Website: nps.gov/gaar

Gates of the Arctic National Park and Preserve is a national park of the United States that protects portions of the Central Brooks Range in northern Alaska. The park is the northernmost national park in the United States, situated entirely north of the Arctic Circle. The area of the park and preserve is the second largest in the U.S. at 8,472,506 acres (13,238 sq mi; 34,287 km^{2}); the national park portion (7,523,897 acres (30,448.1 km^{2})) is the second largest in the U.S., after the national park portion of Wrangell–St. Elias National Park and Preserve.

Gates of the Arctic was initially designated as a national monument on December 1, 1978, before being redesignated as a national park and preserve upon passage of the Alaska National Interest Lands Conservation Act in 1980. About 85% of the combined park and preserve has additional protection as the Gates of the Arctic Wilderness, which covers 7,167,192 acres (2,900,460 ha). The wilderness area adjoins the Noatak Wilderness. Together, they form the largest contiguous wilderness in the United States.

== Park purpose ==
According to the National Park website:

The purpose of Gates of the Arctic National Park and Preserve is to preserve the vast, wild, undeveloped character and environmental integrity of Alaska's central Brooks Range and to provide opportunities for wilderness recreation and traditional subsistence uses.

== Geography ==
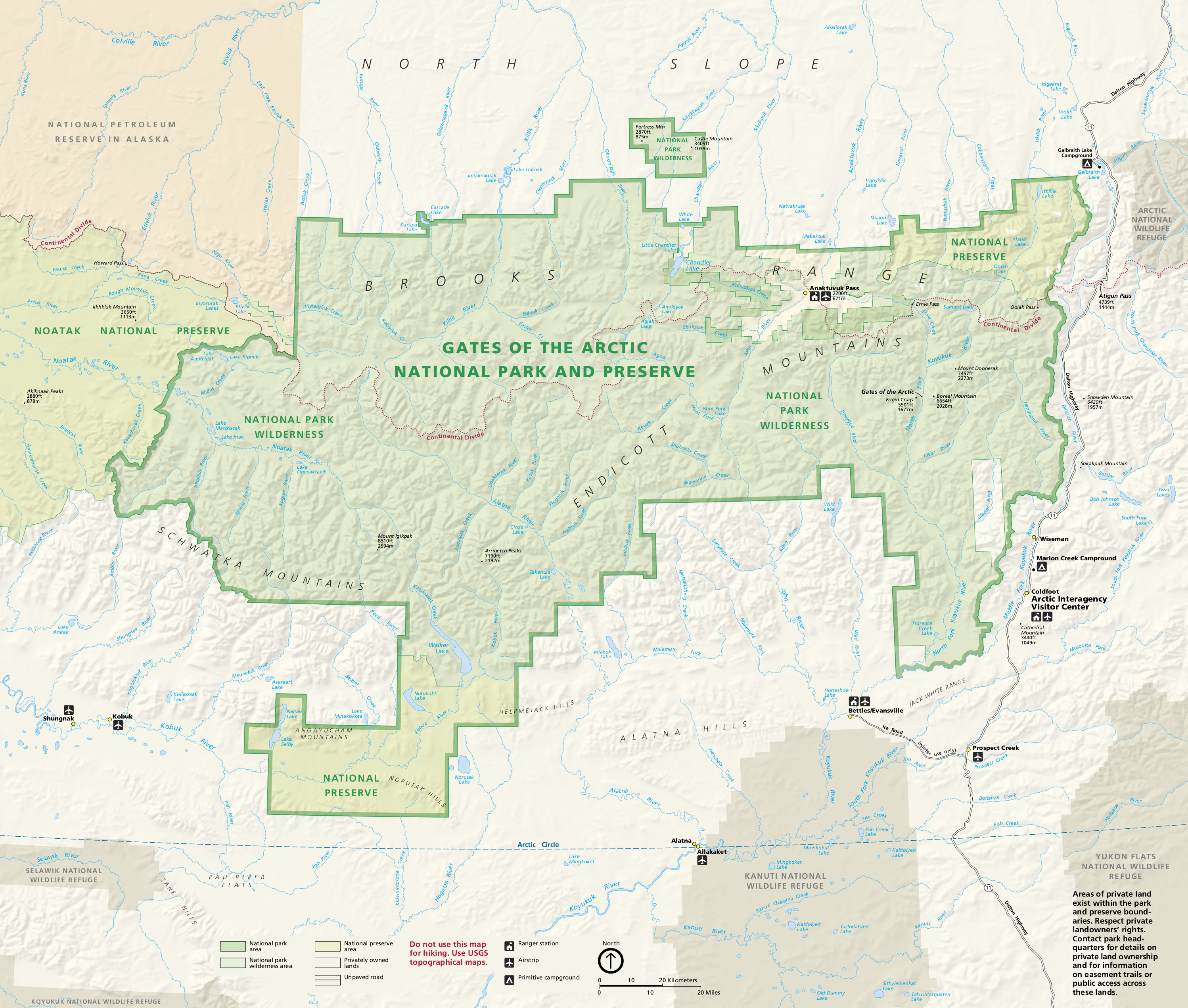
Park map - also see resolution adjustable map

Gates of the Arctic National Park and Preserve lies to the west of the Dalton Highway, centered on the Brooks Range and covering the north and south slopes of the mountains. The park includes the Endicott Mountains and part of the Schwatka Mountains.

The eastern boundary of the park generally follows the Dalton Highway at a distance of a few miles, with the westernmost part of the Arctic National Wildlife Refuge 10 miles (16 km) farther east. Kanuti National Wildlife Refuge is near the park's southeast boundary. Noatak National Preserve adjoins the western boundary, and the National Petroleum Reserve–Alaska adjoins the northwest corner of the park. Almost all of the park is designated as wilderness, with the exception of areas around Anaktuvuk Pass, which is an Iñupiat settlement in the middle of the park. A detached portion of the park surrounds the outlying Fortress Mountain and Castle Mountain to the north of the park.

The Brooks Range features multiple mountain lakes, many of them formed in glaciated rock basins or as moraine-dammed lakes. Walker Lake, which lies on the south slope of the Brooks Range, is the largest one in the park, at 14 miles long and 1 mile wide.

The park also features six Wild and Scenic Rivers:

- Alatna River 83 miles (134 km)
- John River 52 miles (84 km)
- Kobuk River 110 miles (177 km)
- the North Fork of the Koyukuk River 102 miles (164 km)
- part of the Noatak River
- Tinayguk River 44 miles (71 km)

=== Human settlement ===
The majority of Gates of the Arctic is designated as national park, in which only subsistence hunting by local rural residents is permitted. Sport hunting is only permitted in the national preserve. To hunt and trap in the preserve, a person must have all required licenses and permits and follow all other state regulations.

Ten small communities outside the park's boundaries are classified as "resident zone communities" and depend on park resources for food and livelihood. They are Alatna, Allakaket, Ambler, Anaktuvuk Pass, Bettles, Evansville, Hughes, Kobuk, Nuiqsut, Shungnak, and Wiseman. About 259,000 acres (105,000 ha) of the park and preserve are owned by native corporations or the State of Alaska. 7,263,000 acres (2,939,000 ha) are protected in the Gates of the Arctic Wilderness, the third-largest designated wilderness area in the United States (after the Wrangell-Saint Elias Wilderness and the Mollie Beattie Wilderness, both also in Alaska). As a wilderness area, there are no established roads, trails, visitor facilities, or campgrounds in the park, although some informal ATV trails exist to and out of Anaktuvuk Pass. The Dalton Highway (Alaska State Highway 11) comes within five miles (8 km) of the park's eastern boundary, but requires a river crossing to reach the park from the road.

=== Climate ===
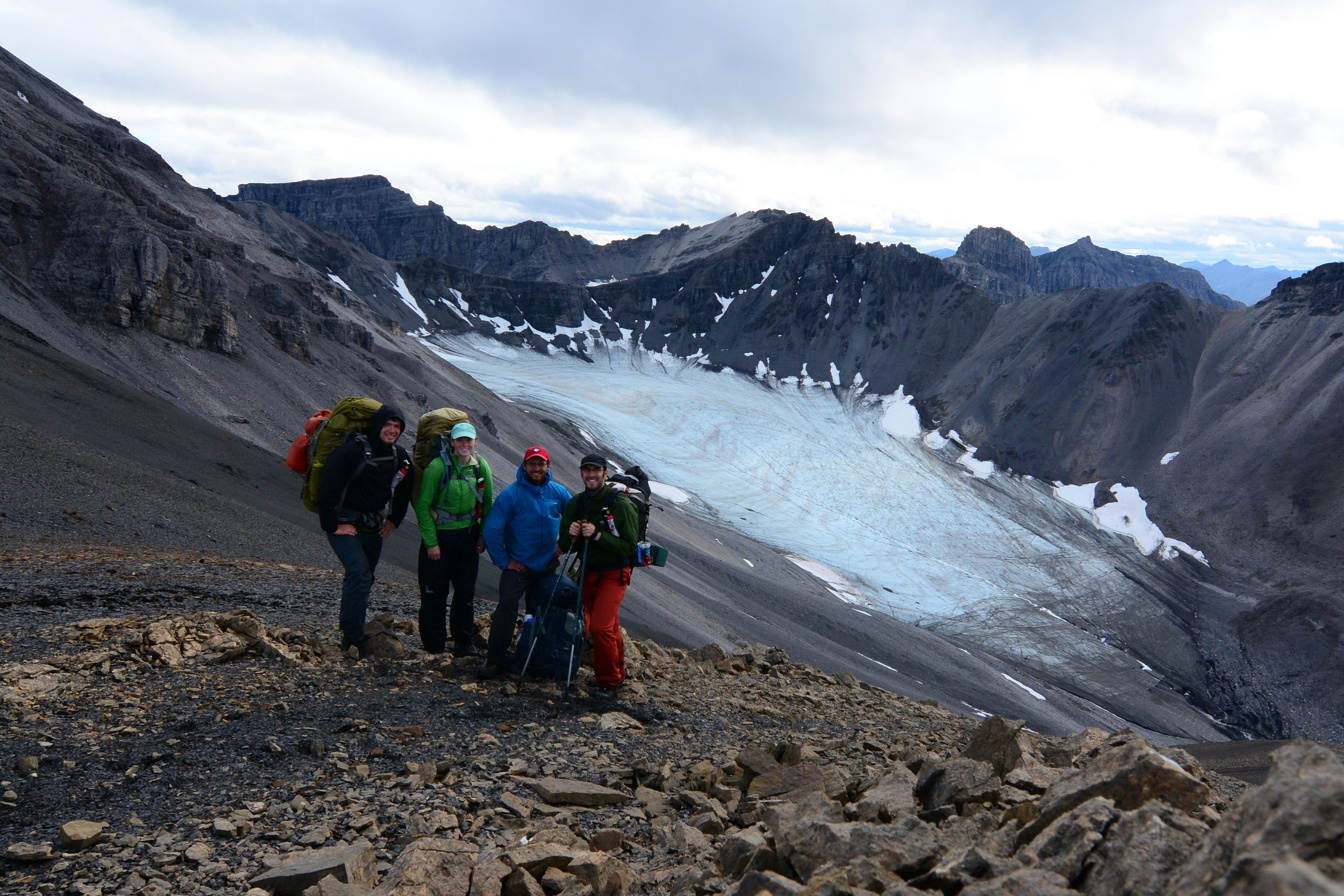
Group of hikers overlooking a glacier in the Gates of the Arctic National Park and Preserve.

According to the Köppen climate classification system, Gates of the Arctic National Park and Preserve has a Subarctic with Cool Summers and Year Around Rainfall Climate (Dfc). The plant hardiness zone at Anaktuvuk Pass Ranger Station is 2b with an average annual extreme minimum temperature of −42.6 °F (−41.4 °C). Perennial snowfields and glaciers, which are crucial to various ecosystems within the park, are decreasing at a rapid rate due to warming temperatures. From 1985 to 2017, the area of these snowfields decreased in size by 13 km^{2}. These warming temperatures have also resulted in the thawing of permafrost which has directly affected the stability of the soil. As permafrost thaws, it exposes the bare soil to the elements which leads to erosion and slope failures.

== Geology ==
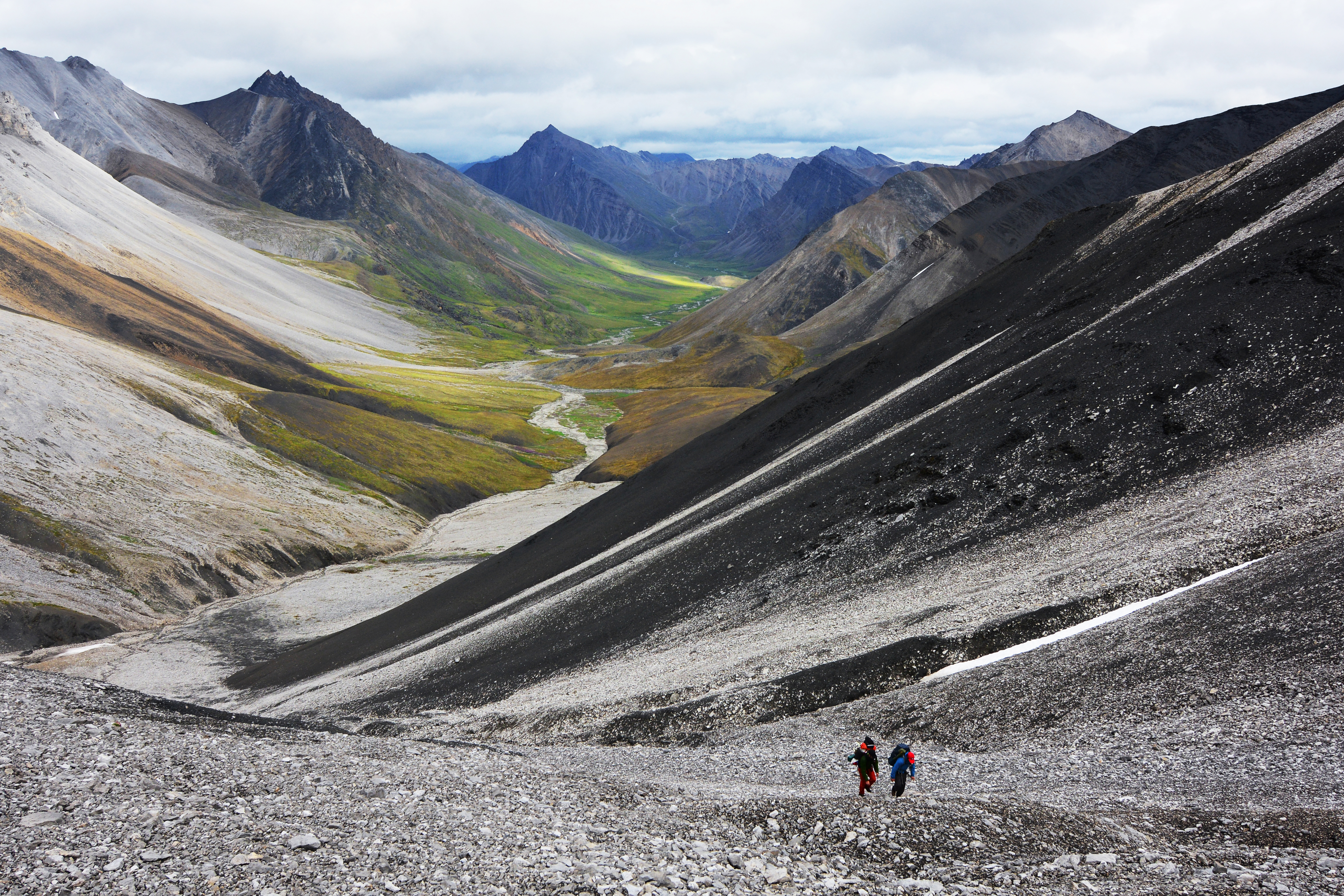
A pair of hikers climbs toward a high pass in the Central Brooks Range.

The park includes much of the central and eastern Brooks Range. It extends to the east as far as the Middle Fork of the Koyukuk River, which is paralleled by the Dalton Highway and the Trans-Alaska Pipeline. The park straddles the continental divide, separating the drainages of the Pacific and Arctic Oceans. The northernmost section of the park includes small portions of the Arctic foothills tundra. The Brooks Range occupies the central section of the park, running on an east–west line. To the south of the Brooks Range the Ambler-Chandalar Ridge runs east–west. Between the mountains are many remote glacier-carved valleys, dotted with alpine lakes.

The southernmost portion of the park includes the Kobuk-Selawik Lowlands, with the headwaters of the Kobuk River. The Brooks Range has seen repeated glaciation, with the most recent called the Itkillik glaciation from about 24,000 years ago to roughly 1500 to 1200 years before the present.

== Ecology ==
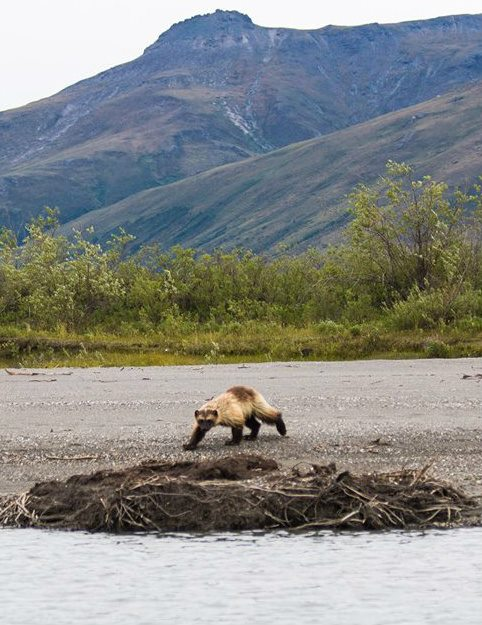
Wolverine on the bank of the Noatak River

The boreal forest extends to about 68 degrees north latitude, characterized by black and white spruce mixed with poplar. To the north of that line, which coincides with the spine of the Brooks Range, lies the tundra. The tundra is blanketed by mosses and lichens, with patches of short, shrubby willows. During the long winters temperatures can reach −75 °F (−59 °C), but can reach 90 °F (32 °C) for a short time in summer. The park lies above the Arctic Circle.

Fauna include brown bears, black bears, muskoxen, moose, Dall sheep, Interior Alaskan wolves, wolverines, coyotes, lynxes, Arctic ground squirrels, lemmings, voles, marmots, porcupines, river otters, red and Arctic fox species, beavers, wood frogs, snowshoe hares, collared pikas, muskrats, Arctic terns, bald eagles, golden eagles, peregrine falcons, ospreys, great horned and northern hawk-owls. The rivers contain a variety of fish species, including the grayling, Arctic char and chum salmon. Eagles and other birds of prey can be seen soaring overhead waiting for unsuspecting prey.

More than half a million caribou, including the Central Arctic, Western Arctic, Teshekpuk, and Porcupine herds, migrate through the central Brooks Range twice yearly, traveling north in summer, and south in winter. Caribou are important as a food source to native peoples. However, the decreasing size of perennial snowfields within the park may decrease the size of this caribou population. The park is the northernmost range limit for the Dall sheep. About 132 brown bears reside in the park and preserve, based on a density of about one bear per 100 square miles (260 km^{2}).

== History ==
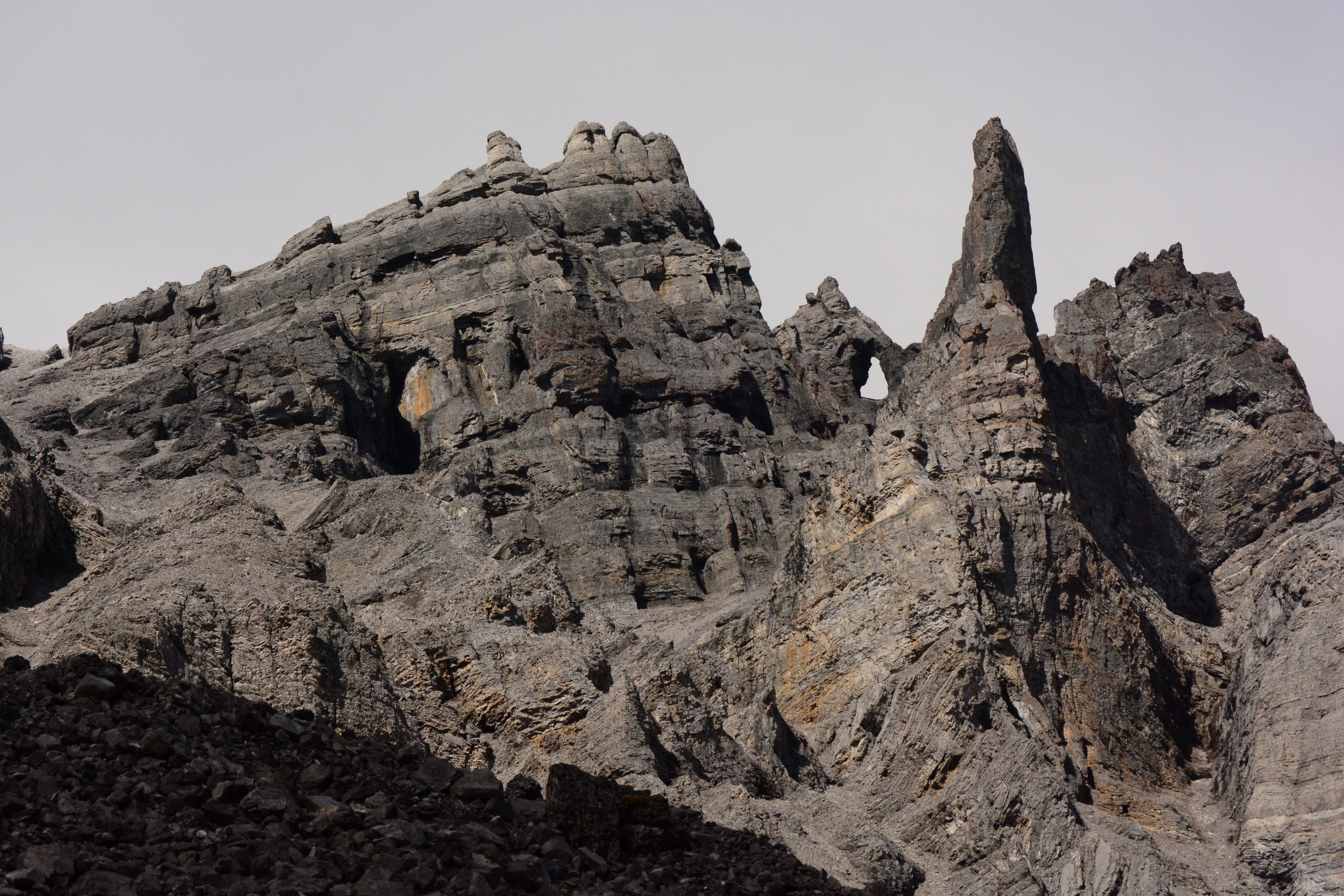
Ancient seabed formations have weathered into cliffs, fins, pinnacles, and arches.

Nomadic peoples have inhabited the Brooks Range for as many as 12,500 years, living mainly on caribou and other wildlife. The Mesa site at Iteriak Creek has yielded evidence of occupation between 11,500 and 10,300 years before the present. Later sites from around 6,000 years before present have yielded projectile points, stone knives and net sinkers. The Arctic small tool tradition (ASTt) of about 4,500 BP has also been documented. A late phase of the ASTt from between 2500 and 950 BP, the Ipuitak phase, has been documented in the park at the Bateman Site at Itkillik Lake.

The earliest Iñupiat people appeared about 1200 AD at the coast and spread to the Brooks Range, becoming the Nunamiut, literally "people of the land". The Iñupiat, who had migrated to the Arctic coast following a crash in the caribou populations in the early 1900s, resumed caribou hunting after returning to the mountains in the late 1930s. In 1949 the last two semi-nomadic bands came together in the valley of the Anaktuvuk River, and over the next decade established the community of Anaktuvuk Pass. The Gwich'in people, a Northern Athabaskan group also lived in the area in the last 1000 years. The two peoples occasionally fought, culminating in an all-encompassing battle in the mid-19th century that lead to the retreat of the Gwich'in, moving south of the Brooks Range.

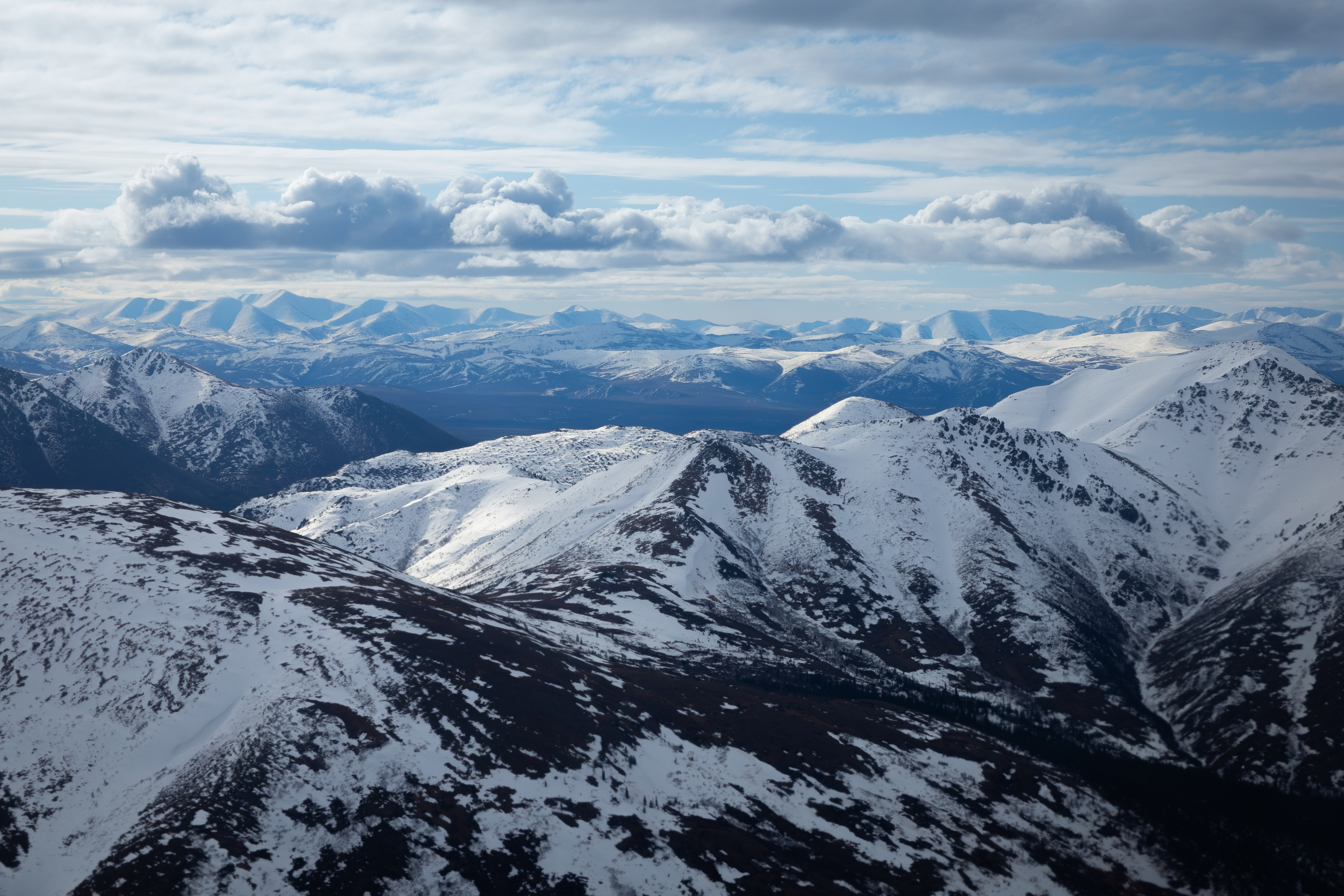
Aerial view of Gates of the Arctic National Park in 2026

The Alaskan interior was not documented until the late 19th century, shortly before discovery of gold in the Klondike brought prospectors to Alaska. Some encampments of explorers and survey parties have been identified in the park. A few small mining operations were established in the early 20th century, never amounting to much.

The park's name dates to 1929, when wilderness activist Bob Marshall, exploring the North Fork of the Koyukuk River, encountered a pair of mountains (Frigid Crags and Boreal Mountain), one on each side of the river. He christened this portal the "Gates of the Arctic". Marshall spent time in Wiseman during the early 1930s, publishing an account of the place in his 1933 book Arctic Village. Marshall, inspired by his time in the region, advocated for the preservation of the American wilderness and helped found the Wilderness Society. In the 1940s writer and researcher Olaus Murie also proposed that Alaskan lands be preserved.

Proposals for a national park in the Brooks Range first emerged in the 1960s, and in 1968 a National Park Service survey team recommended the establishment of a 4,100,000-acre (1,700,000 ha) park in the area. That year, Secretary of the Interior Stewart Udall recommended to President Lyndon B. Johnson that Johnson use the Antiquities Act to proclaim a national monument in the Brooks Range and other Alaskan locations, but Johnson declined. During the 1970s the Alaska Native Claims Settlement Act (ANCSA) prompted serious examination of the disposition of lands held by the federal government. A series of bills were considered to deal with conservation land proposals authorized under ANCSA, but the legislation that would become the Alaska National Interest Lands Conservation Act (ANILCA) was held up in Congress in the late 1970s. Consequently, on December 1, 1978 President Jimmy Carter used the Antiquities Act to proclaim much of the proposed new Alaskan parklands as national monuments, including Gates of the Arctic National Monument. In 1980 Congress passed ANILCA, and the monument became Gates of the Arctic National Park and Preserve on December 2, 1980.

The proposed Ambler Road would cut across 26 miles of the southern portion of the national preserve to provide access to a copper mine.

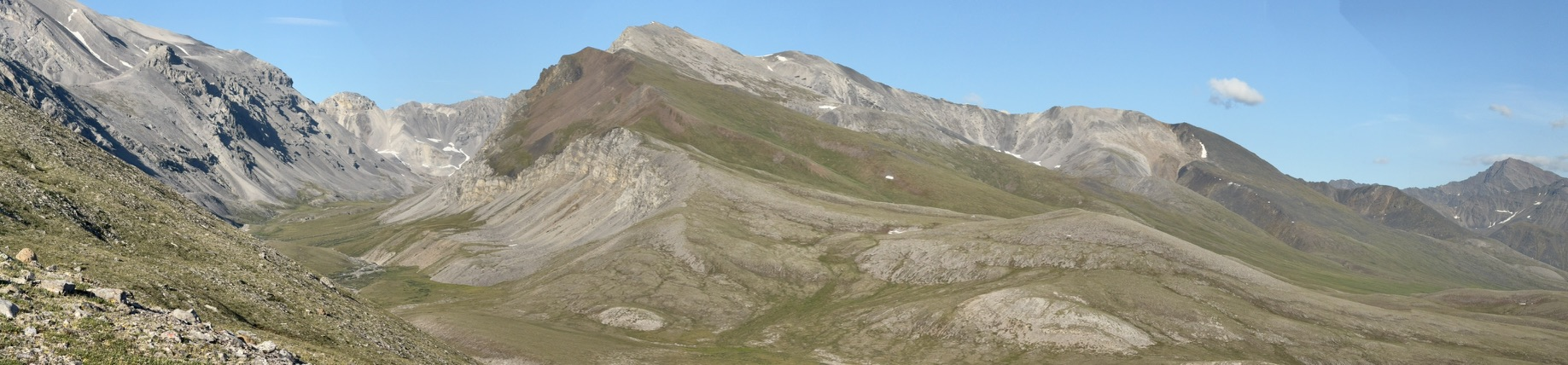
Eroded mountains in the Central Brooks Range, made of rock from ancient sea floors. Taken near Ernie Pass

== Activities ==
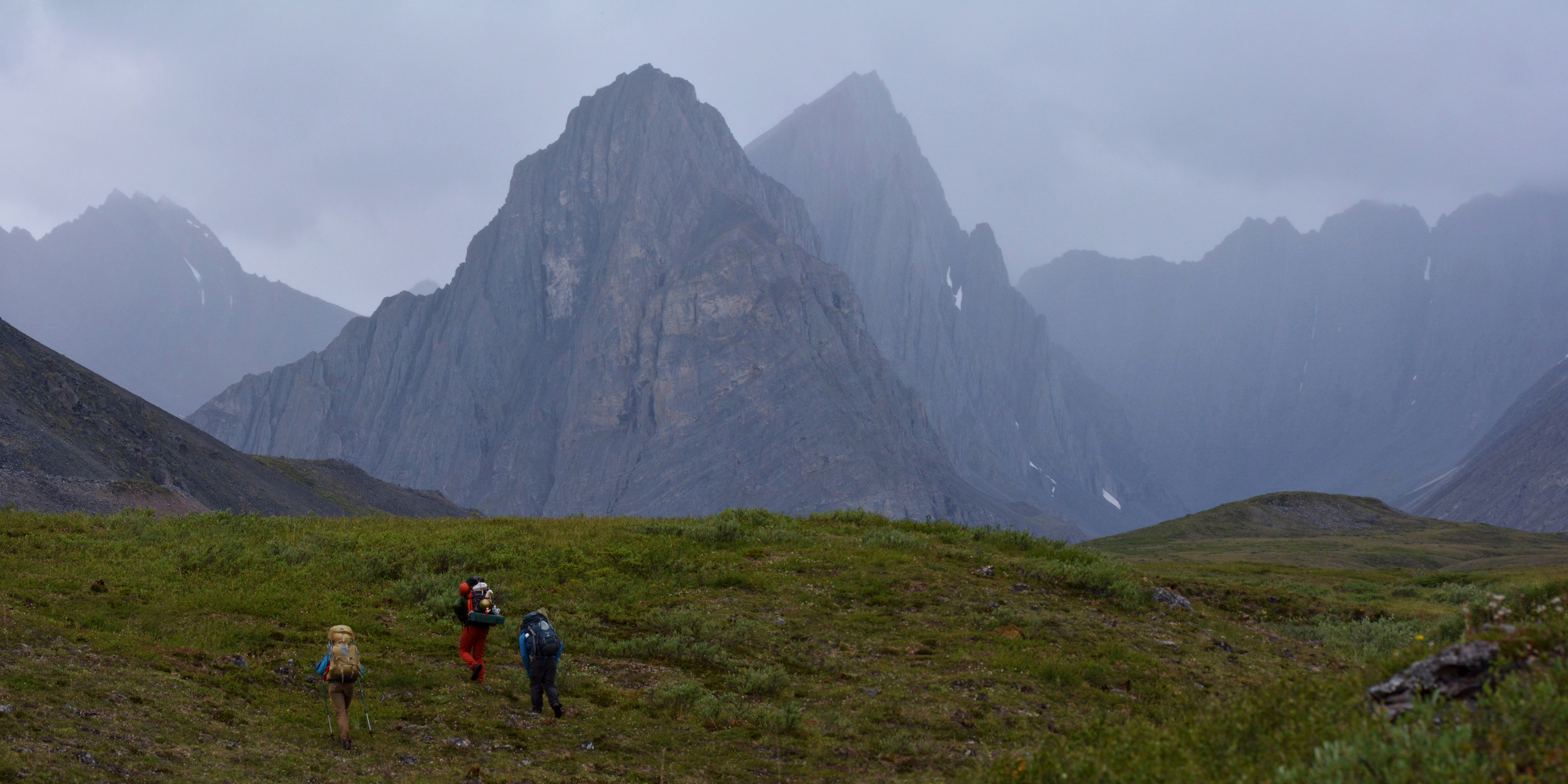
Hikers in the Itkillik River drainage, a group of tilted sedimentary peaks in the central Brooks Range

As a designated wilderness, there are no roads or official trails in Gates of the Arctic National Park and Preserve. Visitors must arrive by bush plane or hike in, usually from the Dalton Highway that runs five miles to the east of the park. Activities include hiking, pack-rafting, and sightseeing tours. Hunting within the park is allowed only by Nunamiut Corporation shareholders. Camping is permitted throughout the park, but may be restricted by easements when crossing Native Corporation lands within the park.

The Arrigetch Peaks and Mount Igikpak are among the most trafficked mountains within the park's territories for hikers.

Owing to its remoteness and lack of supportive infrastructure, the park is the least visited national park in the U.S. In 2021, the park received just 7,362 recreation visitors, while Grand Canyon National Park received about 4.5 million visitors (over 600 times as many) in the same year.

The park headquarters is in Fairbanks. The Arctic Interagency Visitor Center in nearby Coldfoot is open from late May to early September, providing information on the parks, preserves and refuges of the Brooks Range, Yukon Valley and the North Slope. Park Service operations in the park are managed from the Bettles Ranger Station, to the south of the park, as well as a ranger station within the park in Anaktuvuk Pass.

The Simon Paneak Memorial Museum in Anaktuvuk Pass is in the middle of the park (although not legally on park land), and features exhibits on the physical environment of the Brooks Range and the material culture of the Nunamiut.

== See also ==
- List of national parks of the United States

== Bibliography ==
- Marshall, Robert (1956), Alaska Wilderness, George Marshall ed., (2005 reprint), University of California Press ISBN 0-520-24498-2
- Marshall, Robert (1933), Arctic Village. H. Smith and R. Haas, New York.
