= Simon Paneak Memorial Museum =

- Location in North Slope Borough
- Established: 1986
- Location: 345 Mekiana Rd, Anaktuvuk Pass, North Slope Borough, Alaska, United States
- Coordinates: 68.144120°N 151.736556°W
- Collections: Nunamiut culture and history
- Curator: Charles Sollie Hugo
- Owners: North Slope Borough Department of Iñupiat History, Language, and Culture
- Website: Official website

The Simon Paneak Memorial Museum is an ethnographic museum in Anaktuvuk Pass, Alaska that documents and interprets the material history, traditions, and culture of the Nunamiut people, who are inland Iñupiat, or the Alaska Inuit. The museum was established in 1986 and named after Simon Paneak (1900 - 1975), a local historian and ecologist who worked with scholars such as Laurence Irving to document and preserve the knowledge of the Nunamiut and the Arctic environment. The museum is located in a log building in Anaktuvuk and, as of 2005, saw over 1,000 patrons every summer.

The museum's exhibit features 1000 square feet of exhibit space and details the environmental conditions of the Brooks Range, the history and recent settlement of the Nunamiut, and both historic and modern items used by the people, including hunting gear, sleds, traditional clothing, a tupiq (caribou skin tent), caribou skin masks, and other implements. The exhibit also documents the 1949 Long Walk that lead to the subsequent settlement of the Nunamiut into Anaktuvuk Pass.

The museum also hosts the Hans Van Der Laan Brooks Range Library Collection, which features thousands of scientific and research references relating to the Brooks Range and Inuit anthropology, sociology, and linguistics. The collection also consists of photos and collections data, especially of seasonal migratory paths of the Western Arctic Caribou Herd on which the Nunamiut subsist.

The curator is Charles Sollie Hugo.

== See also ==
- Inuit culture
- Nunamiut people
- Anaktuvuk Pass
- Arctic anthropology
