= Village of Anaktuvuk Pass =

Federally recognized Alaska Native village

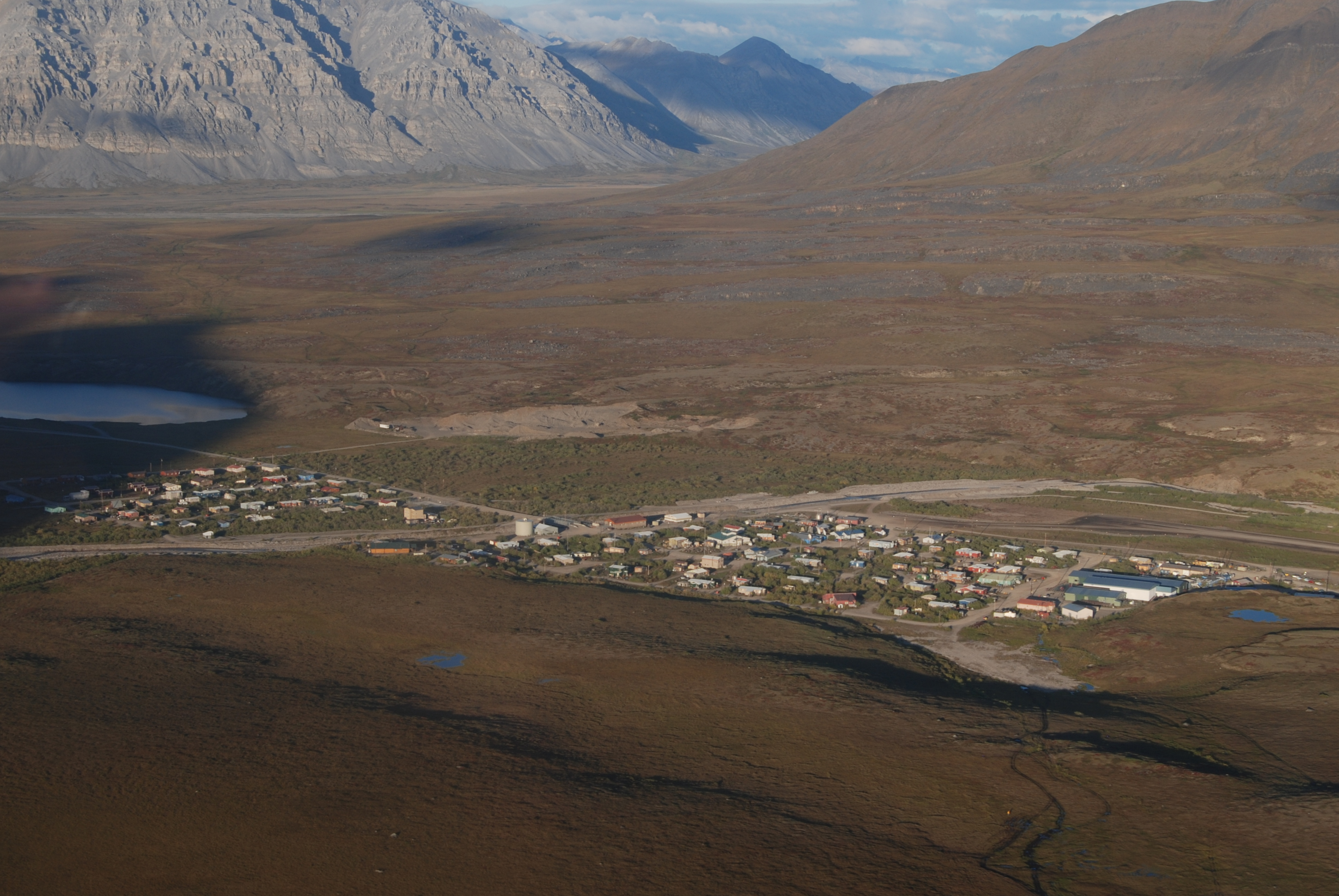
- People: Iñupiat
- Headquarters: Anaktuvuk Pass, Alaska, US

Government
- Chief: Timothy Ahgook

Tribal Council
- Anaktuvuk Tribal Council

The Village of Anaktuvuk Pass is a federally recognized Iñupiat Alaska Native tribal entity.

== History ==
The Village of Anaktuvuk Pass is headquartered in the city of Anaktuvuk Pass, Alaska. As of 2005, the tribe had 279 enrolled citizens.

In 2022, the remains of a Nunamiut man that were being held by the Peabody Museum of Natural History at Yale University were repatriated to the Village of Anaktuvuk Pass. The remains are being held at Simon Paneak Memorial Museum until the tribe can decide when the remains will be buried.

== See also ==
- List of Alaska Native tribal entities
