= SNRC =

SNRC may refer to:

- Saclay Nuclear Research Centre, a French nuclear research centre
- Sequoyah National Research Center, an archival research center at the University of Arkansas at Little Rock
- Soreq Nuclear Research Center, an Israeli nuclear research and development institute
- St Neots Rowing Club, a British rowing club
