= Masks among Eskimo peoples =

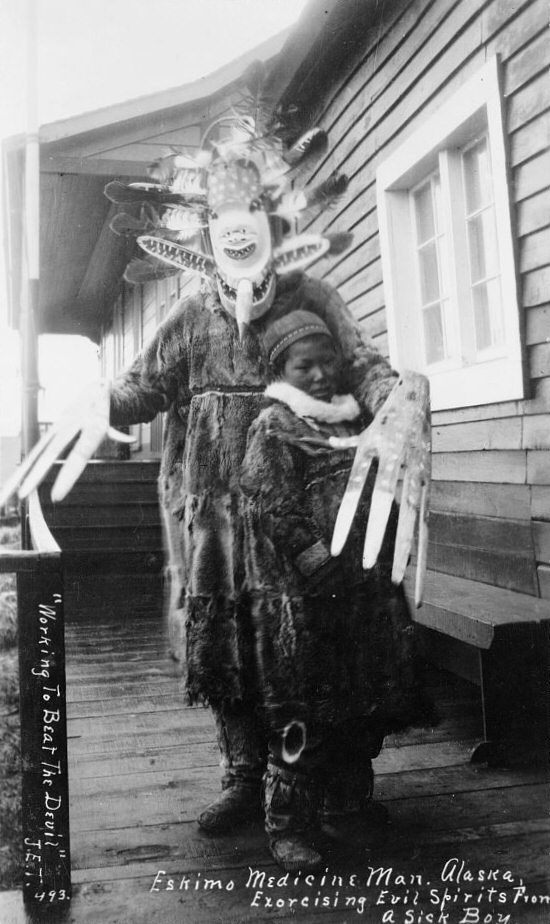
Yup'ik shaman exorcising evil spirits from a sick boy, c.1890.

Masks among Eskimo peoples served a variety of functions. Masks were made out of driftwood, animal skins, bones and feathers. They were often painted using bright colors. There are archeological miniature maskettes made of walrus ivory, dating from early Paleo-Eskimo, including early Dorset culture period.

Despite some similarities in the cultures of the Eskimo peoples, their cultural diversity makes it hard to generalize how different groups, like the Inuit and Yupik used masks. The sustenance, Inuit religion, soul concepts, and even the language of the different communities were often very different.

Eskimo groups comprise a huge area stretching from Siberia through Alaska and Northern Canada (including Nunatsiavut in Labrador and Nunavik in Quebec) to Greenland. The term Eskimo has fallen out of favor in Canada and Greenland, where it is considered pejorative and the term Inuit has become more common. However, Eskimo is still considered acceptable among Alaska Natives of Yupik and Iñupiat (Inuit) heritage, as well as Siberian Yupik peoples, and is preferred over Inuit as a collective reference.

== Early masks ==
Archaeological masks have been found from early Paleo-Eskimo culture period. It is believed that these masks served several functions, including being in rituals representing animals in personalized form; being used by shaman (medicine man or angakkuq) in ceremonies relating to spirits (as in the case of a wooden mask from southwestern Alaska); it is also suggested that they could be worn during song contest ceremonials.

== Associated beliefs ==
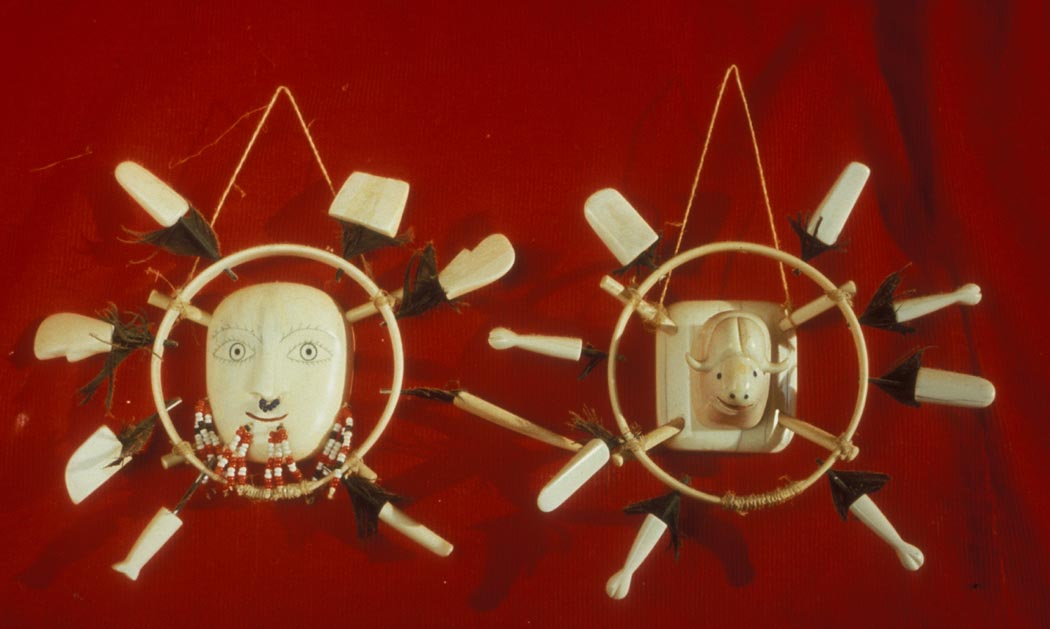
Ceremonial ivory masks produced by Yupik in Alaska

Although beliefs about unity between human and animal did not extend to that of absolute interchangeability, several Eskimo peoples had sophisticated soul concepts (including variants of soul dualism) that linked living humans, their ancestors, and their prey. Besides synchronous beliefs, there were also notions of unity between human and animal, and myths about an ancient time when the animal could take on human form at will. Traditional transformation masks reflected this unity. Ritual ceremonies could enable the community to enact these stories with the help of masks, sometimes with the masked person representing the animal.

On Inuit masks, "concentric circles...usually represent the cosmos."

== Yup'ik masks ==
The Yup'ik are Eskimos of western Alaska whose masks vary enormously but are characterised by great invention. Yup'ik masks differ in size from forehead and finger 'maskettes', to enormous constructions that dancers need external supports to perform with. Many of these masks were used almost as stage props, some of which imbued the dancer with the spirit that they represented - and most were often destroyed after use. Others represented animal people, (yuit), and insects, berries, plants, ice and objects of everyday life.

== Anaktuvuk masks ==
The Nunamiut, who are inland Inuit based in Anaktuvuk Pass, have made caribou skin masks since the 1950s. These masks are made using a wooden mould to shape caribou skin. This practice has spread to other Iñupiat communities as well. These caribou skin masks originated as costumes for winter festivals in the 1950s and thus are not considered traditional, although their design incorporates Inuit styling and motifs. They are still made today as "tourist art".Occasionally, other animal parts such as whalebone or fox, wolf, or squirrel fur are incorporated into the mask as well. Pieces are sewn together, traditionally with sinew, and using glue is discouraged.

== See also ==
- Inuit art
