= Anaktuvuk Pass, Alaska =

City in Alaska, United States

Anaktuvuk Pass Anaqtuuvak
- City
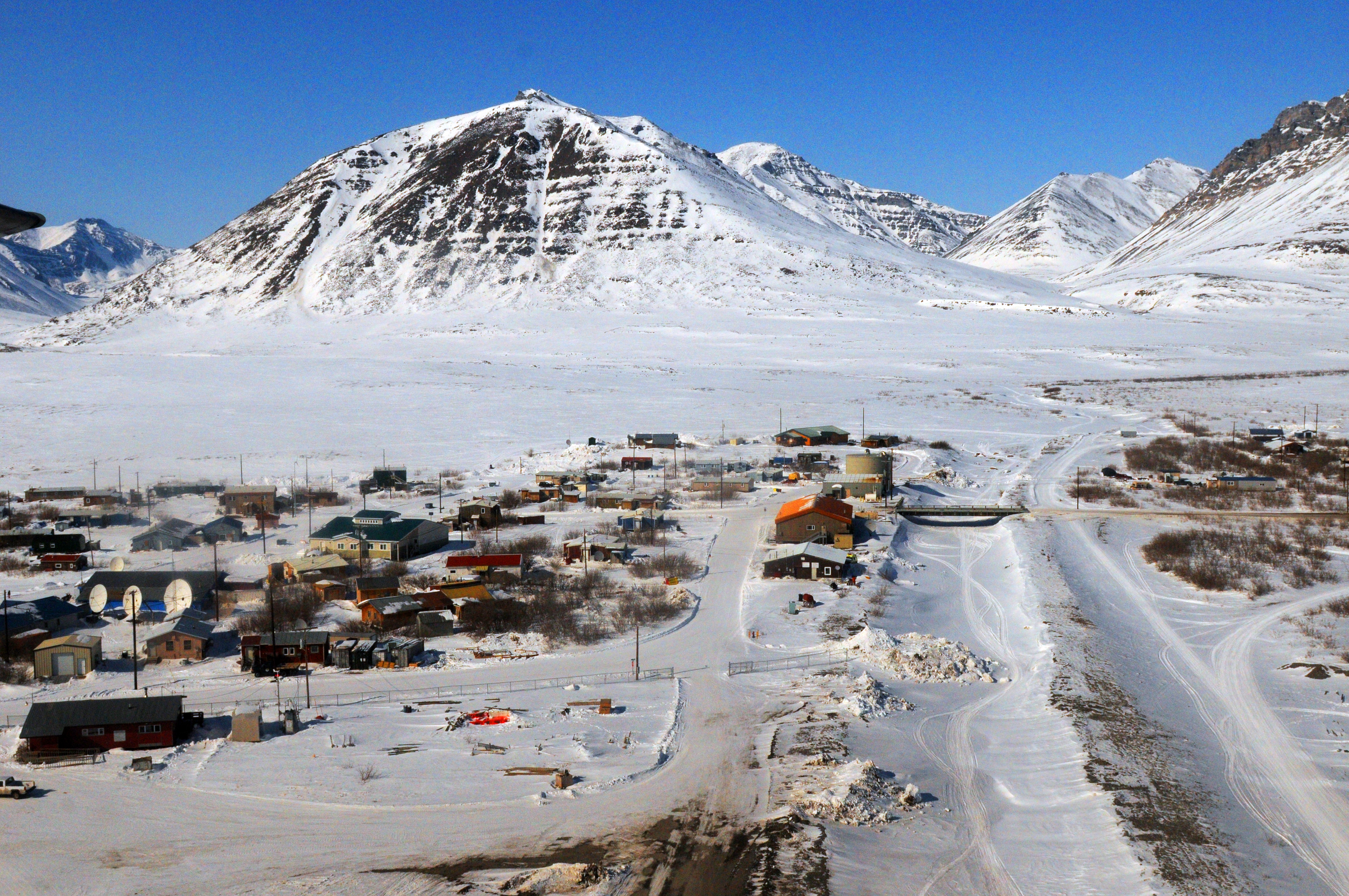
- Aerial view of Anaktuvuk Pass

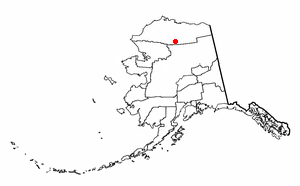
- Location in Alaska
- Coordinates: 68°08′35″N 151°44′01″W
- Country: United States
- State: Alaska
- Borough: North Slope
- Settled: 1949
- Incorporated: June 1957

Government
  - Mayor: Esther Hugo
  - State senator: Donny Olson (D)
  - State rep.: Robyn Burke (D)

Area
  - Total: 5.23 sq mi (13.55 km^{2})
  - Land: 5.18 sq mi (13.41 km^{2})
  - Water: 0.054 sq mi (0.14 km^{2})
- Elevation: 2,175 ft (663 m)

Population (2020)
  - Total: 425
  - Density: 82/sq mi (31.7/km^{2})
- Time zone: UTC−09:00 (Alaskan (AKST))
  - Summer (DST): UTC−08:00 (AKDT)
- ZIP code: 99721
- Area code: 907
- FIPS code: 02-02080
- GNIS feature ID: 1398235, 2419354

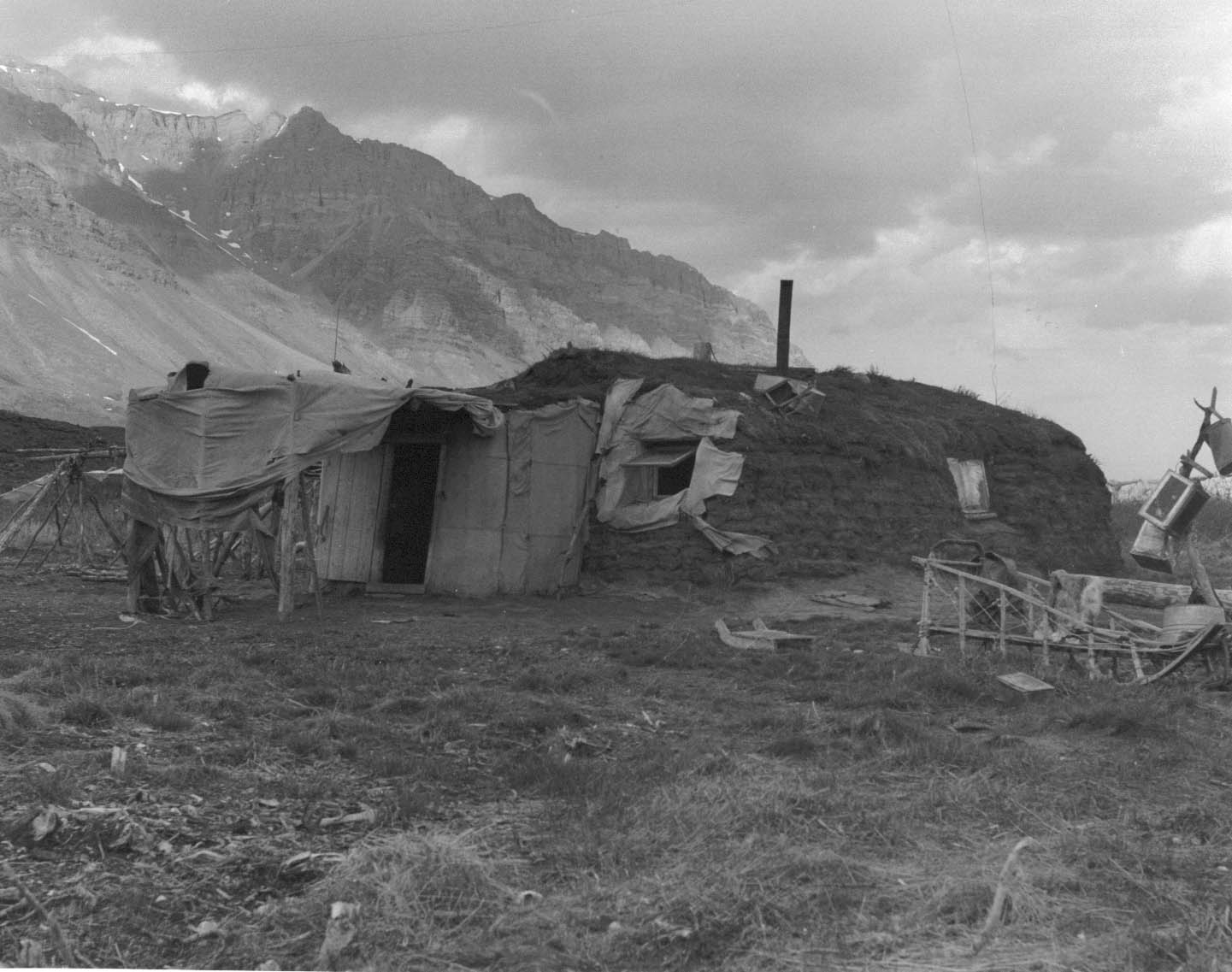
A sod house in Anaktuvuk Pass in 1957. Of the dozen or so built when the settlement was established, one plot still stands today.

Anaktuvuk Pass (Inupiaq: Anaqtuuvak, IPA: [ɐnɑqtuːvɐk], Anaqtuġvik or Naqsraq, IPA: [naχʂɑq]) is a city in North Slope Borough, Alaska, United States. It is located in the middle of Gates of the Arctic National Park and Preserve. The population was 425 at the 2020 census, up from 324 as of the 2010 census.

== History ==
Anaktuvuk Pass was named after the Anaktuvuk River, and lies at the crossing of two mountain valleys. Anaktuvuk is the English way of spelling "anaqtuġvik", place of caribou droppings in Inupiaq, the language of the Inupiat.

Archaeological evidence from the Tuktu-Naiyuk site, located just north of the settlement, indicates human activity dating from 8,000 to 3,000 years before present. Artifacts such as microblades and other Arctic Small Tools from the Paleo-Eskimo Northern Archaic period suggest that the site was used for processing animals.

A nomadic group of Inupiat called Nunamiut, meaning 'people of the land', lived inland in northern Alaska, hunting caribou instead of the marine mammals and fish hunted by the rest of the Inupiat, who live on the coast. The Nunamiut traded with the coastal people for other items they needed. A decline in caribou populations around 1900 and in the 1920s caused many Nunamiut to move to the coast. In 1938, several Nunamiut families moved back to the Brooks Range, around Tulugak and the Killik River.

=== The Long Walk ===
Following a deadly influenza outbreak, in the summer of 1949 a group of families in the Killik River area moved 100 miles to Tulugak Lake, 15 miles north of where the village lies today. Departing from Sulupaat, near the mouth of April Creek on the Killik River, the group included the families of Maptigaq Morry, Inualuuraq (Chris) Hugo, and Homer Mekiana. They traveled on foot with dogs fitted with pack saddles made of caribou, using salvaged military rations when available. This became known by local oral historians as the "Long Walk". After spending the summer around Tulugak Lake, many of the families moved to the present site at the headwaters of the John River, where the village of Anaktuvuk Pass took shape. This journey marks the merging of independent, nomadic Inupiaq groups into one sedentary lifestyle settlement. Their settlement tracked broader changes among the Nunamiut in the 1940s, including increased trade for firearms and provisions. The last nomadic family joined them in 1960, and Anaktuvuk Pass remains the only place of communal settlement within the Brooks Range.

The city was incorporated in 1959. A Presbyterian church was constructed in 1966, using wood collected from nearby. Anaktuvuk Pass remains the only Nunamiut settlement. In 1973 the village established the Nunamiut Corporation as a result of the 1971 Alaska Native Claims Settlement Act.

=== Gates of the Arctic National Park ===
In 1967, Governor Walter Hickel ordered the construction of an ice road to connect the recently discovered oil fields of the North Slope to southern Alaska. Construction of the Hickel highway began the next winter and was completed a few months later, passing near Anaktuvuk Pass. The Highway quickly flooded from the thawing permafrost as a result of the clearcut vegetation, and the road was abandoned a month later.

The construction of the Hickel Highway prompted the Nunamiut Corporation to campaign for land surrounding Anaktuvuk Pass to be included as part of a proposed national park to protect the area from outside development. In 1980 Congress established the Gates of the Arctic National Park and Preserve. However, the establishment of the National Park prevented some forms of sustenance hunting activities that the Nunamiut had traditionally depended on. In 1996, after years of negotiations, Congress allowed for the use of all-terrain vehicles by Nunamiut Corporation shareholders, which include the vast majority of Anaktuvuk Pass residents.

== Geography ==
Anaktuvuk Pass is in northern central Brooks Range on the divide between the Anaktuvuk River and the John River, at an elevation of 2,200 ft (670 m). It is south of Napaktualuit Mountain. Anaktuvuk Pass is the last remaining settlement of the Nunamiut (People of the Land) Iñupiat Inuit in Alaska.

The community lies at approximately 68°08′35″N 151°44′01″W. It is in Section 18, Township 15 South, Range 2 East, Umiat Meridian, within the Utqiaġvik Recording District. According to the United States Census Bureau, the city has an area of 4.9 sq mi (13 km^{2}), of which 4.8 sq mi (12 km^{2}) is land and 0.1 sq mi (0.26 km^{2}) (1.63%) is water.

=== Climate ===
Anaktuvuk Pass has a typical subarctic climate (Köppen climate classification: Dfc) bordering on a tundra climate (Köppen climate classification: ET), with the average temperature in January −13.4 °F (−25.2 °C) while the warmest month, July, averages 50.3 °F (10.2 °C). Temperatures have ranged from −47 to 91 °F (−44 to 33 °C). Anaktuvuk Pass receives about 11 in (280 mm) of rain yearly, with snowfall averaging about 63 in (160 cm). The area is known for its intense winds and 50-below winters and the generic, framed houses built there in the 1970s. The houses are inefficient for such a climate, according to a Fairbanks Daily News Miner story. On June 28, 1971, the temperature fell to a record summer low of −11 °F (−24 °C), though the data for that year is extremely sparse. The climate record as a whole is irregular, with data compiled only between 1953 and 1973, with most observations in the 1950s.

Climate data for Anaktuvuk Pass (1953–1973)
Month	Jan	Feb	Mar	Apr	May	Jun	Jul	Aug	Sep	Oct	Nov	Dec	Year
Record high °F (°C)	34 (1)	29 (−2)	37 (3)	46 (8)	63 (17)	81 (27)	91 (33)	75 (24)	63 (17)	48 (9)	37 (3)	28 (−2)	91 (33)
Mean daily maximum °F (°C)	−4.0 (−20.0)	−6.5 (−21.4)	1.7 (−16.8)	17.0 (−8.3)	39.5 (4.2)	57.1 (13.9)	60.4 (15.8)	53.0 (11.7)	39.5 (4.2)	15.1 (−9.4)	0.3 (−17.6)	−7.5 (−21.9)	22.1 (−5.5)
Daily mean °F (°C)	−11.6 (−24.2)	−13.4 (−25.2)	−6.4 (−21.3)	7.5 (−13.6)	30.0 (−1.1)	46.6 (8.1)	50.3 (10.2)	44.1 (6.7)	32.4 (0.2)	8.8 (−12.9)	−7.2 (−21.8)	−14.2 (−25.7)	13.9 (−10.1)
Mean daily minimum °F (°C)	−19.2 (−28.4)	−20.2 (−29.0)	−14.5 (−25.8)	−2.0 (−18.9)	20.5 (−6.4)	36.1 (2.3)	40.1 (4.5)	35.3 (1.8)	24.7 (−4.1)	2.7 (−16.3)	−14.7 (−25.9)	−21.0 (−29.4)	5.6 (−14.7)
Record low °F (°C)	−45 (−43)	−47 (−44)	−40 (−40)	−38 (−39)	−12 (−24)	−11 (−24)	8 (−13)	14 (−10)	−2 (−19)	−24 (−31)	−40 (−40)	−45 (−43)	−47 (−44)
Average precipitation inches (mm)	0.32 (8.1)	0.29 (7.4)	0.51 (13)	0.58 (15)	0.51 (13)	1.47 (37)	1.77 (45)	1.52 (39)	1.01 (26)	0.77 (20)	0.49 (12)	0.49 (12)	9.75 (248)
Average snowfall inches (cm)	6.4 (16)	4.2 (11)	7.5 (19)	6.6 (17)	2.8 (7.1)	0.2 (0.51)	0 (0)	0.3 (0.76)	6.6 (17)	10.8 (27)	5.8 (15)	6.5 (17)	57.7 (147)
Source: DRI

== Demographics ==
Historical population
Census	Pop.	Note	%±
1950	66		—
1960	35		−47.0%
1970	99		182.9%
1980	203		105.1%
1990	259		27.6%
2000	282		8.9%
2010	324		14.9%
2020	425		31.2%
U.S. Decennial Census

Anaktuvuk Pass first appeared on the 1950 U.S. Census as an unincorporated village. It formally incorporated (before statehood) in 1957.

Today, a federally recognized tribe is in the community: the Village of Anaktuvuk Pass (a.k.a. Naqsragmiut Tribal Council). The community population is 82.36% Alaska Natives or part Native. Anaktuvuk Pass is a Nunamiut Eskimo community dependent upon subsistence activities. Sale, importation and possession of alcohol are banned in the village.

=== Other demographics ===
As of 2020, an estimated 53.8% of residents speak a language other than English, most likely Iñupiaq, while 46.3% of adults only speak English.

The median income for a household in the city was $83,250, and the median income for a family was $76,250. White individuals had a median income of $99,860 while $23,831 for Alaska Natives (2023 inflation-adjusted dollars). About 16.5% of households were below the poverty line.

=== 2020 census ===
As of the 2020 census, Anaktuvuk Pass had a population of 425. The median age was 24.1 years. 39.5% of residents were under the age of 18 and 5.4% of residents were 65 years of age or older. For every 100 females there were 116.8 males, and for every 100 females age 18 and over there were 112.4 males age 18 and over.

There were 113 households in Anaktuvuk Pass, of which 50.4% had children under the age of 18 living in them. Of all households, 27.4% were married-couple households, 37.2% were households with a male householder and no spouse or partner present, and 24.8% were households with a female householder and no spouse or partner present. About 34.5% of all households were made up of individuals and 8.9% had someone living alone who was 65 years of age or older.

There were 136 housing units, of which 16.9% were vacant. The homeowner vacancy rate was 0.0% and the rental vacancy rate was 0.0%.

Racial composition as of the 2020 census
Race	Number	Percent
White	71	16.7%
Black or African American	0	0.0%
American Indian and Alaska Native	315	74.1%
Asian	0	0.0%
Native Hawaiian and Other Pacific Islander	0	0.0%
Some other race	0	0.0%
Two or more races	39	9.2%
Hispanic or Latino (of any race)	7	1.6%

== Facilities, utilities, schools, health care and museum ==
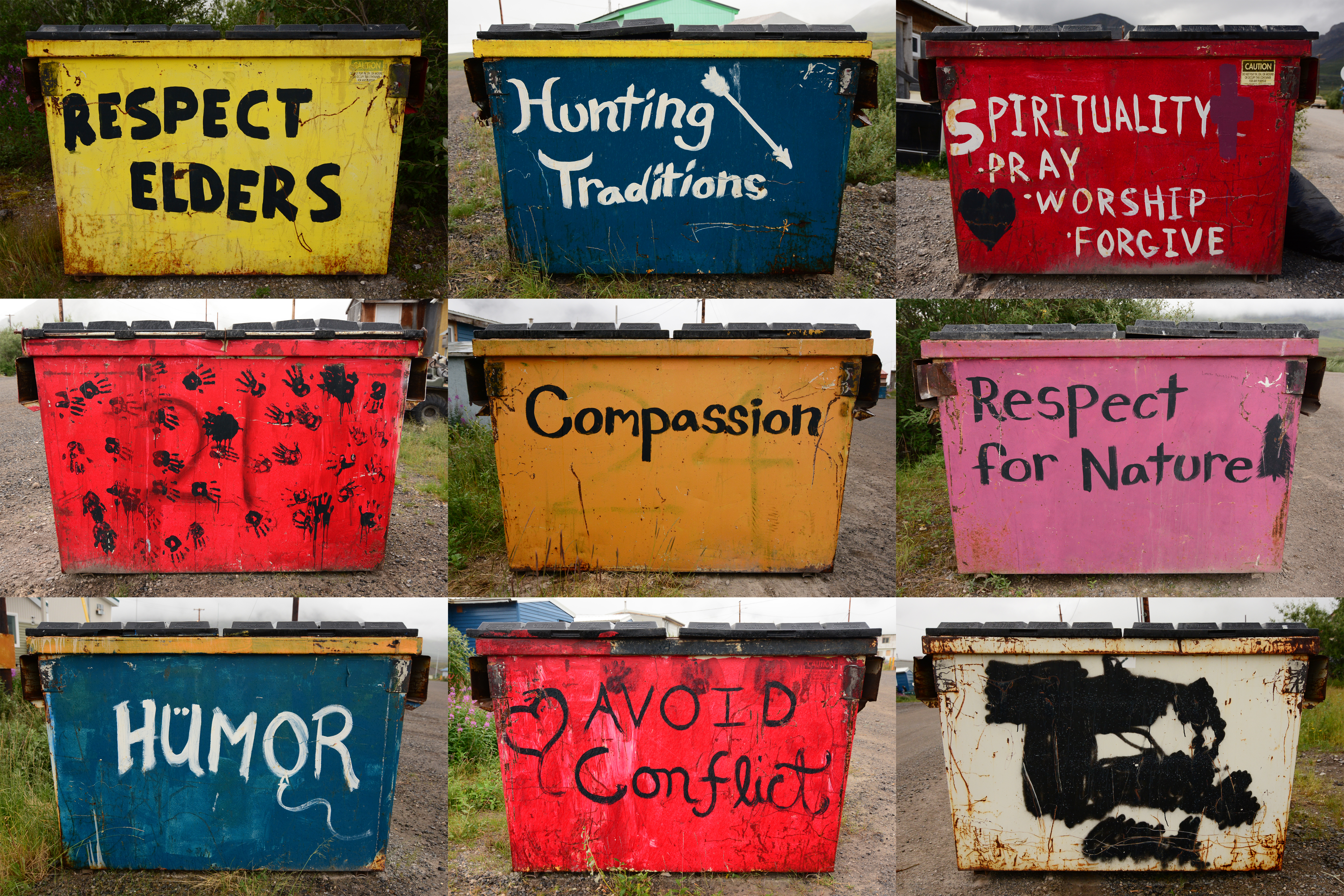
Dumpsters in Anaktuvuk Pass, painted with slogans that promote community values.

The North Slope Borough provides all utilities to Anaktuvuk Pass. Two central wells and a treated watering point at Nunamiut School serve the town for water. Most households have water delivered by truck to holding tanks. A few residents haul their own water. Almost 80% of homes have running water in the kitchen. In 1996, a $17 million project to provide piped water and sewer and household plumbing began construction, which will provide flush toilets and showers for all residences. A new landfill is also near completion. Electricity is provided by North Slope Borough.

There is one school in the community, the Nunamiut School, attended by 110 students as of August 10, 2017.

The only local health clinic is the Anaktuvuk Pass Health Clinic, a primary health care facility. Anaktuvuk Pass is classified as an isolated village, found in EMS Region 6A in the North Slope Region. Emergency services have access to the town by air. Emergency service is provided by volunteers and health aides; there are no doctors on site. Auxiliary health care is provided by Anaktuvuk Pass Volunteer Fire Department.

The Nunamiut's culture and history is described and preserved through photographs and artifacts at the Simon Paneak Memorial Museum in Anaktuvuk Pass. The museum curator is Charles Hugo, a direct descendant of Inualuuraq Hugo, who took part in the 1949 Long Walk.

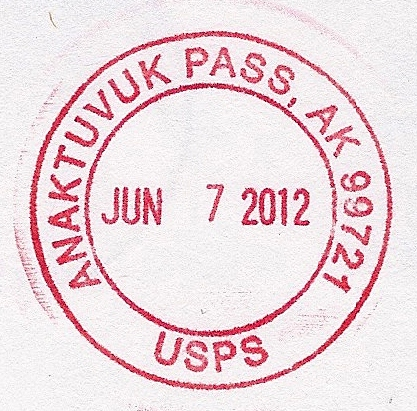

Anaktuvuk Pass post office was established in May 1951. The first postmaster was Homer Mekiana. It is considered the most isolated post office in the United States.

== Economy and transportation ==
Economic and employment opportunities are limited in Anaktuvuk Pass, due to its isolation. Hunting and trapping for sale of skins, guiding hunters, or making traditional caribou skin masks or clothing provides income, though some residents have sought seasonal employment outside the town.

Caribou is the primary source of meat, with other subsistence foods including trout, grayling, moose, sheep, brown bear, ptarmigan and water fowl.

Anaktuvuk Pass Airport, a 4,800 feet (1,463 m) gravel airstrip, is owned and operated by the North Slope Borough, and provides Anaktuvuk Pass with year-round access. A $3.4 million airport improvement project was completed by fall 1999, allowing many air companies to provide passenger flight service to Anaktuvuk Pass. There is no road to Anaktuvuk Pass, but Cat trains transport cargo from the Dalton Highway (which serves as the Trans-Alaska pipeline haul road) during the winter. Snowmobiles and all-terrain vehicles are used for local transportation, though some standard vehicles are used.

== Media ==
Anaktuvuk Pass is home to two low-power FM translators. K268AB (FM 101.5) is a rebroadcaster of KBRW-FM, a public radio station in Utqiaġvik and K232DU, a rebroadcast of KYKD, a religious station from Bethel. Anaktuvuk Pass also has two low-power translators of the statewide Alaska Rural Communications Service on K04IX and K09RS.

== Notable people ==
- Dennis Schmitt, veteran explorer, adventurer

== See also ==
- List of cities in Alaska
