= Anaktuvuk Pass =

Mountain pass in Brooks Range, Alaska

- Interactive map of Anaktuvuk Pass
- Elevation: 2,200 ft (670 m)

Location
- Location: North Slope Borough, Alaska, U.S.
- Range: Brooks Range
- Coordinates: 68°08′47″N 151°43′21″W

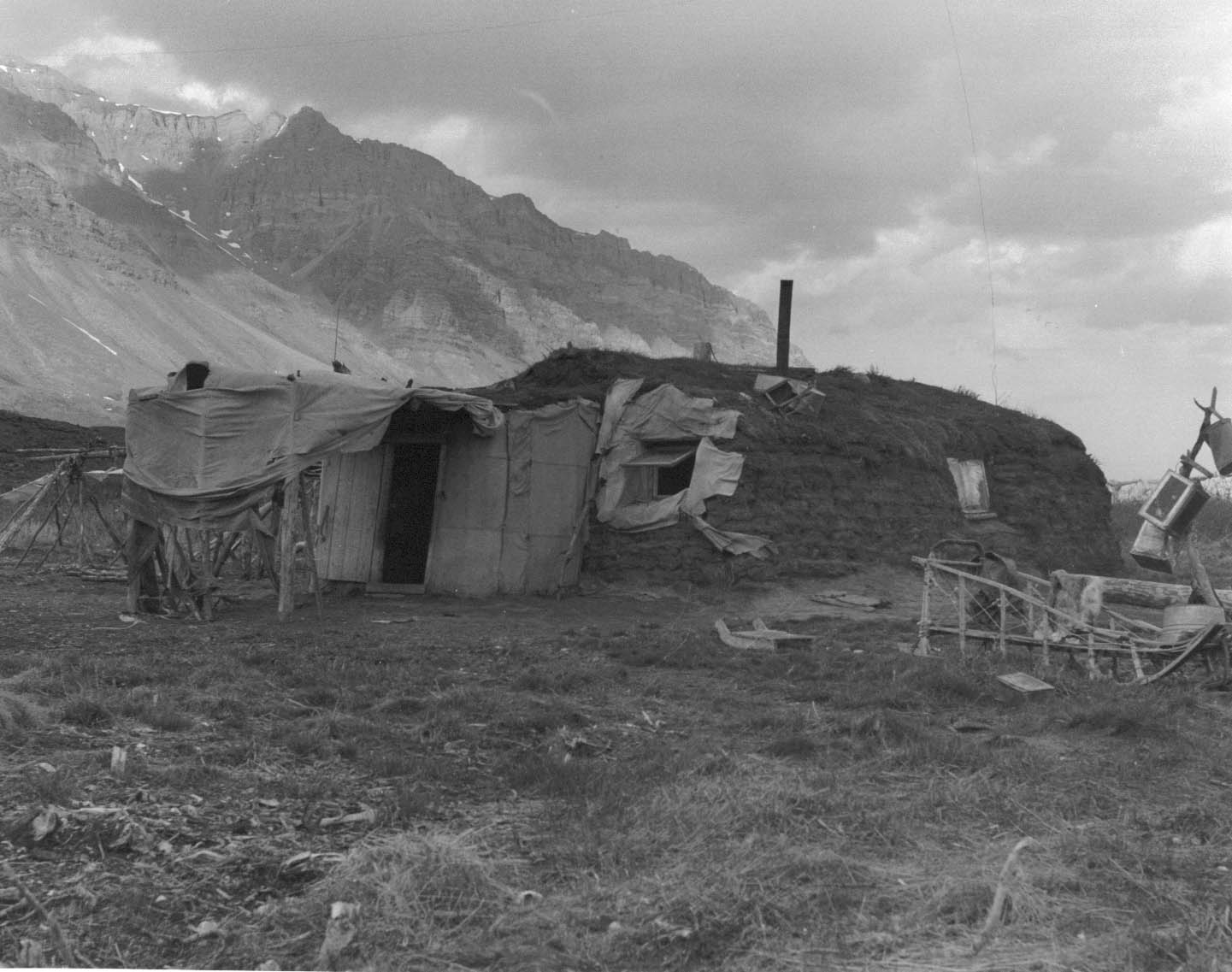
Village of Anaktuvuk Pass in 1957.

The Anaktuvuk Pass ("the place of caribou droppings", el. 2,200 ft.) is a mountain pass located in Gates of the Arctic National Park and Preserve within the Brooks Range in northern Alaska. The Anaktuvuk Pass lies at where the Anaktuvuk River begins to flow south into the John River. To the east is Anaktuvuk Valley, which is crossed by the continental divide.

Anaktuvuk Pass is also the name of the settlement in the pass, the home of the only concentrated population of the Nunamiut, the inland Iñupiat group in Alaska.

== Climate ==
Anaktuvuk Pass has a Polar climate, specifically a tundra climate, but lies within the southern periphery of the climate zone, bearing some characteristics of a cold subarctic climate, but overall being a clear cut tundra climate, with the low precipitation being not much different than that of a desert. Anaktuvuk Pass also has not seen temperatures rise above freezing during January or February. Summer is defined as the time period when the most precipitation is received, often in the form of rain, hence June through September. Meanwhile, in the winter, the village receives snowfall but not as much as places further south, such as Fairbanks; however, the snowfall in Anaktuvuk Pass persists much longer into the "spring" season.

== Education ==
The North Slope Borough School District operates the Nunamiut School in Anaktuvuk Pass.

== See also ==
- List of rivers of Alaska
