= Alatna, Alaska =

Alatna, Alaska Alaasuq
- CDP
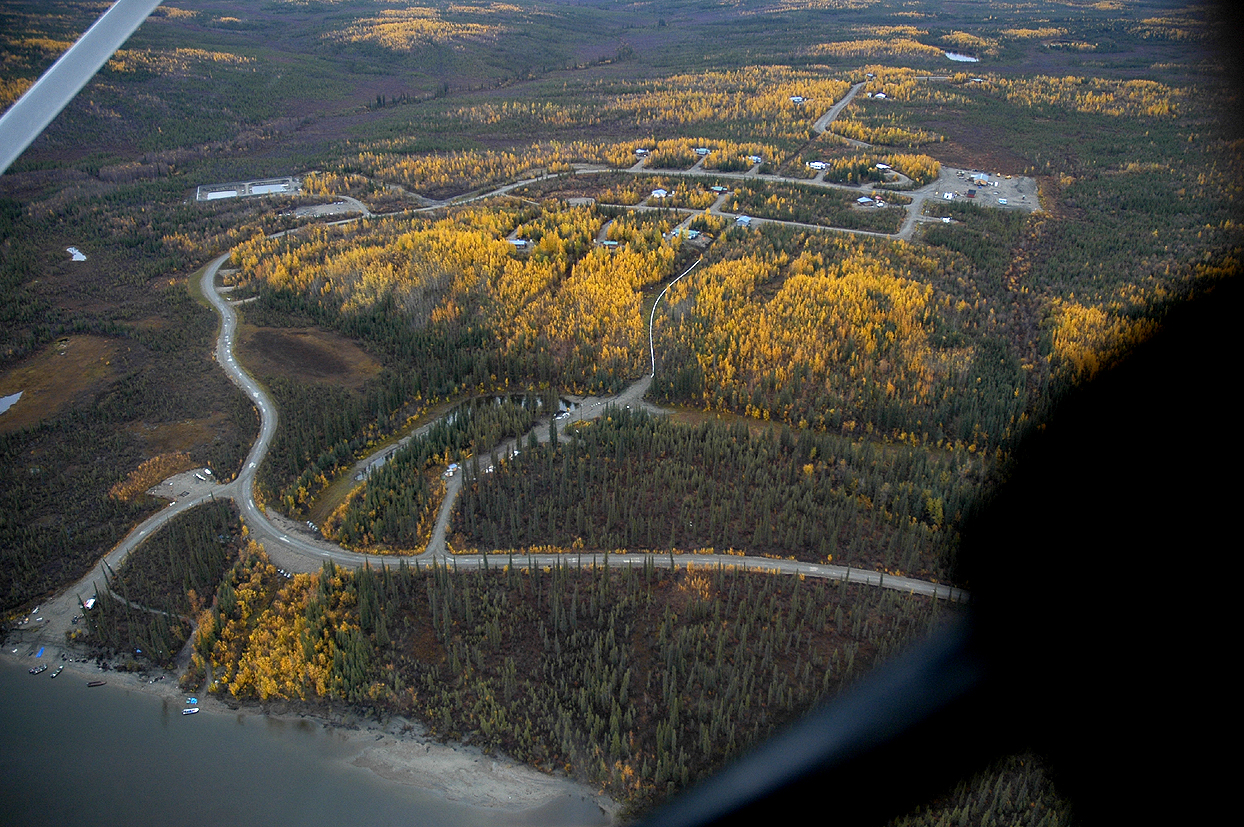
- Aerial view of Alatna

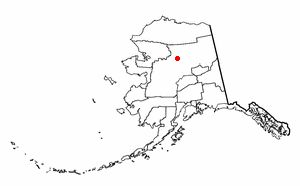
- Location of Alatna, Alaska
- Coordinates: 66°32′56″N 152°50′41″W
- Country: United States
- State: Alaska
- Census Area: Yukon-Koyukuk

Government
  - State senator: Mike Cronk (R)
  - State rep.: Rebecca Schwanke (R)

Area
  - Total: 36.48 sq mi (94.49 km^{2})
  - Land: 36.48 sq mi (94.49 km^{2})
  - Water: 0 sq mi (0.00 km^{2})

Population (2020)
  - Total: 15
  - Density: 0.41/sq mi (0.16/km^{2})
- Time zone: UTC-9 (Alaska (AKST))
  - Summer (DST): UTC-8 (AKDT)
- ZIP code: 99720
- Area code: 907
- FIPS code: 02-01305

Alatna /əˈlætnə/ (Alaasuq in Iñupiaq [ɐˈlaːsoq]) is a census-designated place (CDP) in the Yukon-Koyukuk Census Area of the Unorganized Borough in the U.S. state of Alaska. The population was 15 at the time of the 2020 census.

== Geography ==
Alatna is at 66°34′01″N 152°39′59″W (66.548906, -152.844806) (Sec. 33, T021N, R024W, Fairbanks Meridian) in the Fairbanks Recording District.

Alatna is on the north bank of the Koyukuk River, southwest of its junction with the Alatna River, approximately 190 miles (310 km) northwest of Fairbanks and 57 miles (92 km) upriver from Hughes. Alatna lies just west of the municipal boundaries of the city of Allakaket.

The area experiences a cold, continental climate with extreme temperature differences. The average high temperature during July is 70 °F (21 °C). The average low during January is well below 0 °F (−18 °C), and extended periods of −40 °F/C are common. The highest temperature ever recorded was 94 °F (34 °C); the lowest, −75 °F (−59 °C). Average annual precipitation is 13 inches (33 cm) and average annual snowfall is 72 inches (183 cm). The Koyukuk River is ice-free from June through October.

According to the United States Census Bureau, the CDP has an area of 36.5 square miles (95 km^{2}), all of it land.

== Climate ==
Climate data for Alatna
Month	Jan	Feb	Mar	Apr	May	Jun	Jul	Aug	Sep	Oct	Nov	Dec	Year
Mean daily maximum °F (°C)	−9 (−23)	0 (−18)	14 (−10)	32 (0)	51 (11)	68 (20)	69 (21)	64 (18)	50 (10)	30 (−1)	5 (−15)	5 (−15)	32 (0)
Mean daily minimum °F (°C)	−31 (−35)	−25 (−32)	−18 (−28)	3 (−16)	30 (−1)	41 (5)	44 (7)	39 (4)	30 (−1)	12 (−11)	−14 (−26)	−27 (−33)	7 (−14)
Average precipitation inches (mm)	0.8 (20)	0.7 (18)	0.7 (18)	0.4 (10)	0.6 (15)	1.3 (33)	2.0 (51)	2.2 (56)	1.5 (38)	1.2 (30)	0.9 (23)	0.8 (20)	13.1 (330)
Source: Weatherbase

== History and culture ==
Several Alaska Native groups have lived in the area, including Koyukon Athabascans and Kobuk, Selawik, and Nunamiut from the north and northwest. The Koyukon lived in several camps throughout the year, moving as the seasons changed, following the wild game and fish. The various bands established joint settlements after 1851. The old site of Alatna was a trading center for Athabascans and Inuit. The first mission on the Koyukuk River, St. John's-in-the-Wilderness Episcopal Mission, was established in 1906. A post office was opened in 1925. In 1938, the community's name was changed to Allakaket (the old name for the mission), and the name Alatna was assumed by the small Eskimo community across the river. The first public school was established in 1957. A flood caused by ice jamming inundated 85% of the community in the Spring of 1964. In 1975, the community incorporated as a city, including both settlements of Allakaket and Alatna. A clinic and airport were built in 1978. A school and community roads were built in 1979. In September 1994, flood waters destroyed nearly all of the community's buildings, homes, and food caches for the winter. Residents have rebuilt near the old city site, but Alatna is no longer within the incorporated city boundaries.

A federally recognized Alaskan village is in the community—the Alatna Village. The population of the community consists of 97.1% Alaska Native or part Native. The Alatna population consists largely of descendants of Kobuk Eskimos; Athabascans predominantly live in Allakaket. Subsistence activities are prevalent.

== Demographics ==
=== Old Alatna (1920-1994) ===
Historical population
Census	Pop.	Note	%±
1920	32		—
1930	131		309.4%
1940	28		−78.6%
1950	31		10.7%
1980	30		—
1990	31		3.3%
2020	15		—
U.S. Decennial Census

The "original" Alatna first appeared as an unincorporated village on the 1920 census. At the time, it was located directly on the (north) west bank of the Yukon at 66°33′44″N 152°40′20″W, a 1/2 mile west across the river from neighboring village Allakaket. The population returns for 1930 combined Alatna and neighboring Allakaket, as the latter did not report a separate total. In 1940 and 1950, the population was exclusively for Alatna. It did not appear on the 1960 or 1970 census rolls. Allakaket incorporated in 1975 and included the village of Alatna within its boundaries on the 1980 census. Alatna, however, was designated as an ANVSA (Alaskan Native Village Statistical Area) on the 1980 census (within the city of Allakaket), with 30 residents (29 of which were Native American). It appeared again in 1990 as a native village (ANVSA), again within Allakaket. In 1994, flooding of the Yukon River forced residents to relocate to higher ground a mile to the west, leaving the city limits of Allakaket.

=== (New) Alatna CDP (1994-) ===
Historical population
Census	Pop.	Note	%±
2000	35		—
2010	37		5.7%
2020	15		−59.5%
U.S. Decennial Census

The post-1994 flood "New" Alatna village, located just outside of the boundaries of the city of Allakaket, was recognized and classified as a census designated place (CDP) in 2000.

At the 2000 census, there were 35 people, 12 households and 6 families residing in the CDP. The population density was 1.0 inhabitant per square mile (0.39/km^{2}). There were 17 housing units at an average density of 0.5 per square mile (0.19/km^{2}). The racial makeup was 2.86% White, 94.29% Native American, and 2.86% from two or more races.

There were 12 households, of which 50.0% had children under the age of 18 living with them, 16.7% were married couples living together, 25.0% had a female householder with no husband present, and 41.7% were non-families. 25.0% of all households were made up of individuals, and none had someone living alone who was 65 years of age or older. The average household size was 2.92 and the average family size was 3.43.

37.1% of the population were under the age of 18, 11.4% from 18 to 24, 25.7% from 25 to 44, 25.7% from 45 to 64. The median age was 26 years. For every 100 females, there were 84.2 males. For every 100 females age 18 and over, there were 100.0 males.

The median household income was $20,313 and the median family income was $52,500. Males had a median income of $22,500 and females $16,250. The per capita income was $14,109. There were no families and 9.1% of the population living below the poverty line, including no under eighteens and none of those over 64.

== Public services ==
Alatna residents haul water and use honeybuckets or outhouses. None of the 12 occupied homes have plumbing. Major improvements are underway. A new water source, water treatment plant, washeteria and sewage lagoon have been built. There is an electrical intertie with Allakaket. Residents use the Allakaket clinic, washeteria, landfill and school. Electricity is provided by the Alaska Power and Telephone Company. There are no state operated schools in the community. Local hospitals or health clinics include Alatna Clinic (907-968-2314). Alatna Clinic is a Primary Health Care facility.

== Economy and transportation ==
The economy is seasonal and subsistence-based. Salmon, whitefish, moose, bear, small game and berries provide most food sources. Caribou are taken when available. A few earn income from trapping or traditional Native handicrafts. Construction and BLM emergency firefighting also provide summer jobs.

Alatna has no road link, but winter trails connect it with Hughes, Bettles and Tanana. River transportation is important during the summer. A state-owned 3,500' lighted runway is accessible year-round in Allakaket. There is no barge service due to shallow water.
