= Heartbeat Alaska =

Alaska Native documentary series

Heartbeat Alaska is a documentary series that aired on Alaska Public Media from 1990 to 2010. The series was produced by Iñupiat journalist Jeanie Greene and showcased the lives of Alaska Natives, as well as their contemporary cultural practices, settlements, and issues facing their communities. Episodes featured news not just pertinent to Alaska Natives but occasionally also from other indigenous peoples across North America. Each episode was hosted by Jeanie Greene, who narrated home videos sent from various Alaskan communities featured on each episode.

The series was commended by Governor Wally Hickel as "fill[ing] a tremendous need in broadcasting not only for Alaska's Native residents but for many other Native American groups, as well as for others around the globe."

The series aired all over Alaska, Navajo Nation, Canada, Greenland, and even the Far East of Russia, who picked up Alaska satellite signals. The series was digitized by the Sequoyah Research Center as part of the Jeanie Green collection and made available on their Youtube channel. The center received a $24,000 grant from the Arkansas Natural and Cultural Resources Council to fund the digitization.

== Awards ==
- 2002 Best ongoing public affairs TV program, Alaska Press Club
