= Sequoyah Research Center =

US research center

The Sequoyah National Research Center (SNRC), located in Little Rock, Arkansas, is the home of the American Native Press Archives (ANPA). ANPA is one of the largest repositories of Native American publications in the world. The Center is also home to the J.W. Wiggins Native American Art Collection, a collection of over 2400 pieces of art by contemporary Native American artists.

From their website:

The American Native Press Archives began in 1983 as a clearinghouse for information on American Indian and Alaska Native newspapers and periodicals. In the ensuing years, it has evolved from a joint effort of the Department of English and the Ottenheimer Library [the UALR library] to a freestanding unit in the University. Its mission has changed from an information exchange to a research facility that collects and archives the products of the Native press and materials related to Native press history, collects and documents the works of Native writers, constructs bibliographic guides to Native writing and publishing, creates digital editions of writers' works, and conducts and publishes original research on topics of importance to Indian communities. It stands today as one of the world's largest repositories of Native thought.

ANPA was founded in 1983 by Dr. Daniel F. Littlefield and Dr. James W. Parins. The SRC is the physical housing, educational, and research portion of ANPA, and ANPA is usually just referred to as "SRC". The SRC is housed and supported by the University of Arkansas at Little Rock.

The name "Sequoyah Research Center" comes from the name Sequoyah, a Cherokee silversmith and inventor of that tribe's syllabary.

== Archival holdings ==
- Newspaper and periodical collections of more than 2100 titles published primarily by Native nations, organizations, and individuals.
- Manuscripts and special collections including papers of scholars and writers, records of media organizations and press history, Native organizations, and tribal history.
- Files on an estimated 4500 Native writers.
- An extensive library.
- Microform holdings of Native newspaper and periodicals, records of tribal nations and organizations, and records of federal agencies.
- The Jeanie Greene film collection of Alaska Native footage, including Heartbeat Alaska, featuring over 1200 recordings.
