= Killik River =

- Location of the mouth of the Killik River in Alaska

Location
- Country: United States
- State: Alaska
- Borough: North Slope, Yukon–Koyukuk Census Area

Physical characteristics
- Source: Confluence of April and Kakivilak creeks
  - location: Gates of the Arctic National Park, Brooks Range, Yukon–Koyukuk Census Area
  - coordinates: 67°46′09″N 154°32′54″W
  - elevation: 4,863 ft (1,482 m)
- Mouth: Colville River
  - location: 52 miles (84 km) southwest of Umiat, North Slope Borough
  - coordinates: 69°00′26″N 153°54′35″W
  - elevation: 548 ft (167 m)
- Length: 105 mi (169 km)

The Killik River is a 105-mile (169 km) tributary of the Colville River in the U.S. state of Alaska. It begins in the northern portion of Gates of the Arctic National Park and flows north onto property of the Arctic Slope Regional Corporation.

The river's headwaters are near Survey Pass in the Endicott Mountains on the north slope of the central Brooks Range, and the river mouth is south of Angoyakvik Pass. The direction of the headwaters stream is northwest at first, then sharply northeast before April and Easter creeks enter from the right slightly north of the North Slope Borough boundary. The river continues northeast for much of its course until it turns northwest again on the lower reaches after receiving the Okokmilaga River from the right.

Major tributaries of the Killik are April and Easter creeks, as well as the Okokmilaga. North of Easter Creek, tributary streams, such as Aniakvik Creek and Nigaktukvik Creek, flow predominantly through short, narrow, V-shaped valleys.

The main stem flows down a U-shaped glacial valley containing lakes, sand dunes, lateral moraines, and alpine tundra. This valley, about 2 miles (3 km) wide initially, widens to between 3 and 5 miles (5 and 8 km) on the lower reaches, and the river becomes braided. Copious stretches of dwarf birch (betula nana), and sedges, with large expanses of sedge bogs and tussocks dominate the tundra.

The Killik is fed largely by precipitation and snow melt, and hence its waters are relatively clear of the sediment that characterizes glacial streams.

== See also ==
- List of rivers of Alaska
