= Alaska Power and Telephone Company =

Logo of the Alaska Power and Telephone Company

Alaska Power and Telephone Company (AP&T) is a communications and utilities firm operating in Alaska. It currently provides service above the Arctic Circle, in the Wrangell Mountains, and throughout southeast Alaska. Its business units are named Power, Telephone, Hydro-Power, Wireless, and Internet.

AP&T was founded in 1957 and is employee-owned.

== See also ==
- List of United States telephone companies
