= Iñupiat =

Indigenous people of Alaska, U.S.

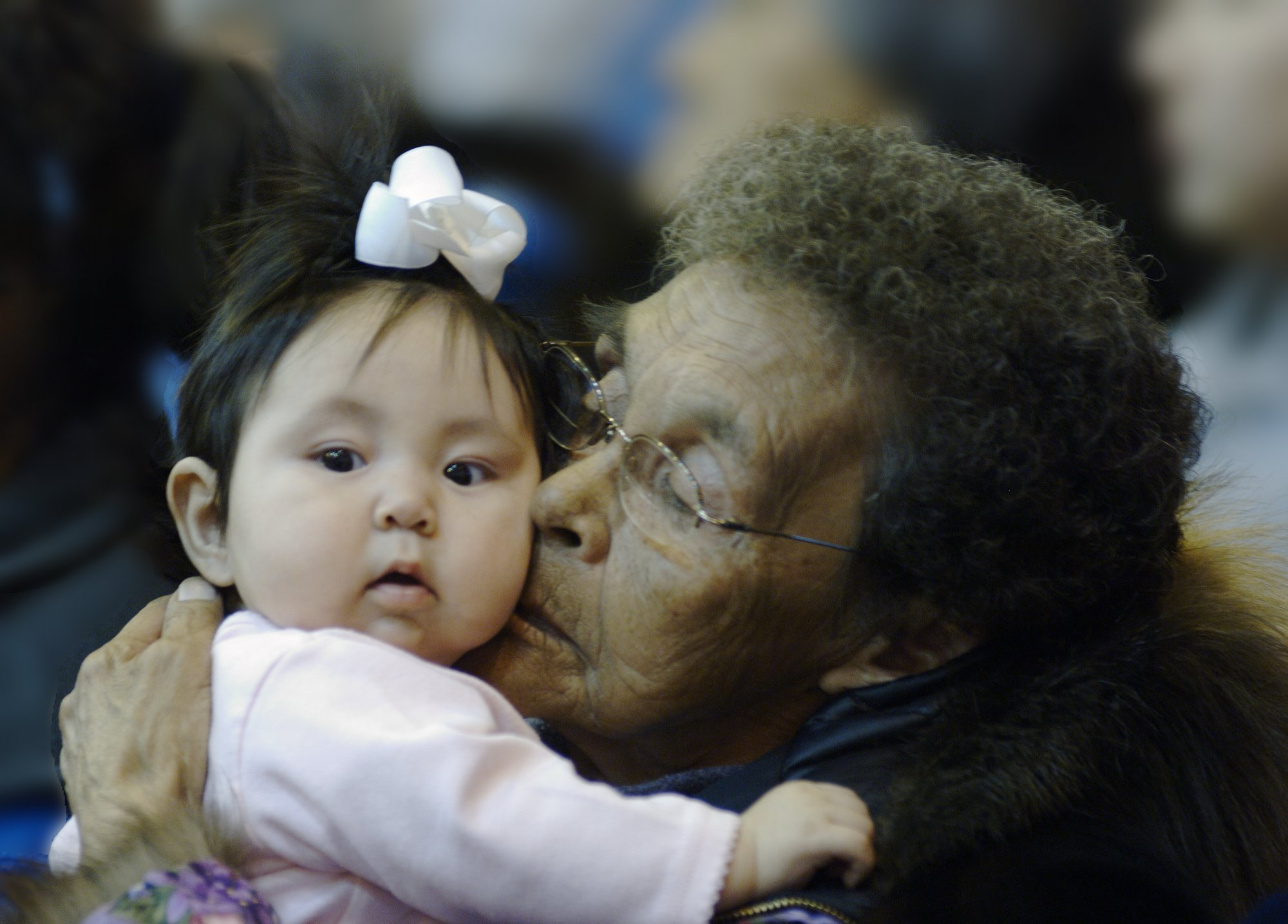
- Iñupiaq woman sharing a kunik with a small child at a Nalukataq in Utqiaġvik, Alaska, 2007

Total population
- 20,709 (2015)

Regions with significant populations
- North and northwest Alaska (United States)

Languages
- English, Inupiaq

Religion
- Christianity, Animism

Related ethnic groups
- Inuit, Yupik

Iñu- / nuna "person" / "land"
- Person: Iñupiaq; Dual: Iñupiak
- People: Inupiat
- Language: Iñupiatun; Urraaraq
- Country: Inuit Nunaat

The Iñupiat (singular: Iñupiaq), also known as Alaskan Inuit, are a group of Alaska Natives whose traditional territory roughly spans northeast from Norton Sound on the Bering Sea to the northernmost part of the Canada–United States border. Their current communities include 34 villages across Iñupiat Nunaat (Iñupiaq lands), including seven Alaskan villages in the North Slope Borough, affiliated with the Arctic Slope Regional Corporation; eleven villages in Northwest Arctic Borough; and sixteen villages affiliated with the Bering Straits Regional Corporation. They often claim to be the first people of the Kauwerak.

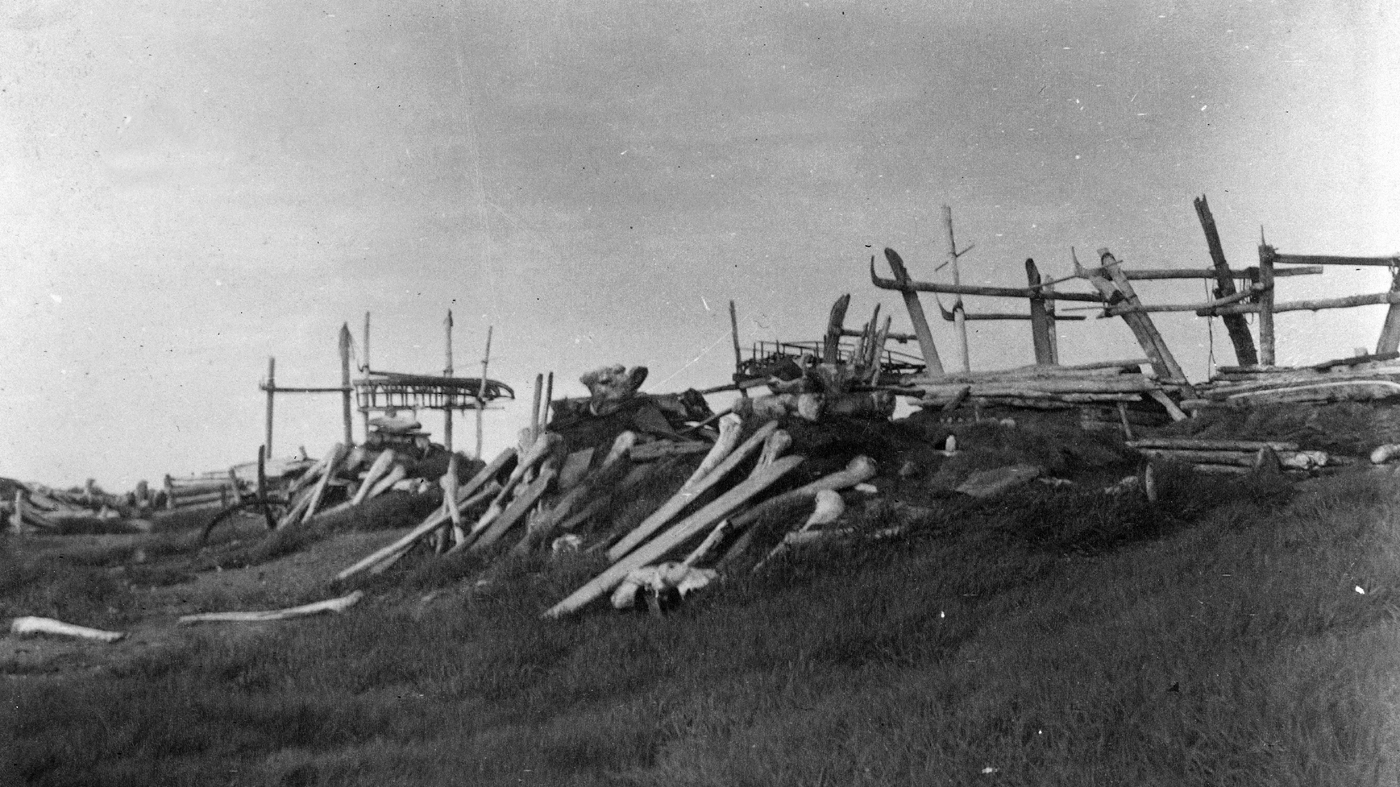
Semi-underground men's community house (Qargi) with bowhead whale bones, Point Hope, Alaska, 1885

== Name ==
Iñupiat (IPA: [iɲupiɐt]) is the plural form of the name for the people (e.g., the Inupiat live in several communities.). The singular form is Iñupiaq (IPA: [iɲupiɑq]) (e.g., She is an Iñupiaq), which can also refer to the language (e.g., She speaks Iñupiaq). In English, both Iñupiat and Iñupiaq are used as modifiers (e.g., An Inupiat/Iñupiaq librarian, Inupiat/Iñupiaq songs). The language is called Iñupiatun in Iñupiatun and frequently in English as well. Iñupiak (IPA: [iɲupiɐk]) is the dual form.

The roots are iñuk "person" and -piaq "real", i.e., an endonym meaning "real people".

== Groups ==
=== Ethnic groups ===
The Iñupiat are made up of the following communities:

- Bering Strait Iñupiat (Sivunmiut)
- South Seward Peninsula Iñupiat (Qawiaraq Inupiat)
- Nunamiut, the inland Inuit
- Northwest Arctic Iñupiat (Malimiut)
- North Alaska Coast Iñupiat (Taġiuġmiut, people of the sea, or Siḷaliñiġmiut)

== Regional corporations ==
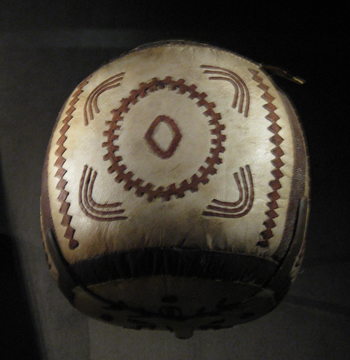
Iñupiaq high-kickball, ca. 1910, Utqiaġvik, Alaska, collection of the NMAI

In 1971, the Alaskan Native Claims Settlement Act established thirteen Alaskan Native Regional Corporations. The purpose of the regional corporations were to create institutions in which Native Alaskans would generate venues to provide services for its members, who were incorporated as "shareholders". Three regional corporations are located in the lands of the Iñupiat:

- Arctic Slope Regional Corporation
- Bering Straits Native Corporation
- NANA Regional Corporation

== Tribal governments ==
Prior to colonization, the Iñupiat exercised sovereignty based on complex social structures and order. Despite the transfer of land from Russia to the U.S. and eventual annexation of Alaska, Iñupiat sovereignty continues to be articulated in various ways. A limited form of this sovereignty has been recognized by Federal Indian Law, which outlines the relationship between the federal government and American Indians. The Federal Indian Law recognized Tribal governments as having limited self-determination. In 1993, the federal government extended federal recognition to Alaskan Natives tribes. Tribal governments created avenues for tribes to contract with the federal government to manage programs that directly benefit Native peoples. Throughout Inupiat lands, there are various regional and village tribal governments. The tribal governments vary in structure and services provided, but often are related to the social well-being of the communities. Services included but are not limited to education, housing, tribal services, and supporting healthy families and cultural connection to place and community.

The following Alaska Native tribal entities for the Iñupiat are recognized by the United States Bureau of Indian Affairs:

Community	Native tribal entities	Native village corporation	Native regional corporation
Alatna (Alaasuq)	Alatna Village	None	Doyon, Limited
Ambler (Ivisaappaat)	Native Village of Ambler	None	NANA Corporation
Anaktuvuk Pass (Anaqtuuvak/Naqsraq)	Village of Anaktuvuk Pass	Nunamiut Corporation	Arctic Slope Regional Corporation
Atqasuk (Atqasuk)	Native Village of Atqasuk	Atqasuk Corporation	Arctic Slope Regional Corporation
Brevig Mission (Sitaisaq/Sinauraq)	Native Village of Brevig Mission	None	Bering Straits Native Corporation
Buckland (Nunatchiaq/Kaŋiq)	Native Village of Buckland	None	NANA Corporation
Council (Akauchak/Kaułiq)	Native Village of Council	None	Bering Straits Native Corporation
Deering (Ipnatchiaq)	Native Village of Deering	None	NANA Corporation
Diomede (Iŋaliq)	Native Village of Diomede	None	Bering Straits Native Corporation
Elim (Nivviaqhchauġluq)	Native Village of Elim	None	Bering Straits Native Corporation
Golovin (Siŋik/Chiŋik)	Chinik Eskimo Community	None	Bering Straits Native Corporation
Kaktovik (Qaaktuġvik)	Kaktovik Village	Kaktovik Inupiat Corporation	Arctic Slope Regional Corporation
Kiana (Katyaaq)	Native Village of Kiana	None	NANA Corporation
King Island (Ugiuvak)	King Island Native Community	King Island Native Corporation	Bering Straits Regional Corporation
Kivalina (Kivalliñiq)	Native Village of Kivalina	None	NANA Corporation
Kobuk (Laugviik)	Native Village of Kobuk	None	NANA Corporation
Kotzebue (Qikiqtaġruk)	Native Village of Kotzebue	Kikiktagruk Corporation	NANA Corporation
Koyuk (Kuuyuk)	Native Village of Koyuk	None	Bering Straits Native Corporation
Mary's Igloo (Qawiaraq/Iglu)	Native Village of Mary's Igloo	None	Bering Straits Native Corporation
Noatak (Nuataaq)	Native Village of Noatak	None	NANA Corporation
Nome (Sitnasuaq)	Nome Eskimo Community	Sitnasuak Corporation	Bering Straits Native Corporation
Noorvik (Nuurvik)	Noorvik Native Community	None	NANA Corporation
Nuiqsut (Nuiqsat)	Native Village of Nuiqsut	Kuukpik	Arctic Slope Native Corporation
Point Hope (Tikiġaq)	Native Village of Point Hope	Tikiġaq Corporation	Arctic Slope Regional Corporation
Point Lay (Kali)	Native Village of Point Lay	Cully Corporation	Arctic Slope Regional Corporation
Selawik (Akuliġaq/Siiḷivik)	Native Village of Selawik	None	NANA Corporation
Shaktoolik (Saqtuliq)	Native Village of Shaktoolik	None	Bering Straits Native Corporation
Shishmaref (Qigiqtaq)	Native Village of Shishmaref	Shismaref Native Corporation	Bering Straits Native Corporation
Shungnak (Isiŋnaq)	Native Village of Shungnak	None	NANA Corporation
Solomon (Aaŋuutaq)	Village of Solomon	None	Bering Straits Native Corporation
Teller (Tala/Iġaluŋniaġvik)	Native Village of Teller	Teller Native Corporation	Bering Straits Native Corporation
Unalakleet (Uŋalaqłiq)	Native Village of Unalakleet	Unalakleet Native Corporation	Bering Straits Regional Corporation
Utqiaġvik	Native Village of Barrow Inupiat Traditional Government	Ukpeagvik Corporation	Arctic Slope Regional Corporation
Wainwright (Ulġuniq)	Village of Wainwright	Olgoonik Corporation	Arctic Slope Regional Corporation
Wales (Kiŋigin)	Native Village of Wales	None	Bering Straits Regional Corporation
White Mountain (Nachizrvik)	Native Village of White Mountain	None	Bering Straits Native Corporation

== Languages ==
The Inuit languages has been described as historically “the most widespread language in the world”, spoken across the circumpolar Arctic from the western edges of Siberia through Alaska, northern Canada to Greenland. They form a dialect continuum and have differing names depending on the region it is spoken in. In Northern Alaska, the language is called Iñupiatun, and is further divided into four major dialects: North Slope, Malimiut, Bering Straits, and Qawiaraq. Before European contact, the Iñupiaq dialects flourished. Due to harsh assimilation efforts in Native American boarding schools, Natives were punished for speaking their language. Now only 2,000 of the approximately 24,500 Iñupiat can speak their Native tongue, and most are elderly.

Revitalization efforts have focused on Alaskan Native languages and ways of life. Located in Kotzebue, Alaska, an Iñupiaq language immersion school called Nikaitchuat Iḷisaġviat was established in 1998. The immersion school's mission is to "instill the knowledge of Iñupiaq identity, dignity, respect and to cultivate a love of lifelong learning". June Nelson Elementary school is another school in Kotzebue that is working to include more content into their curriculum about Iñupiaq language and culture. Nome Elementary School in Nome, Alaska has also put in place plans to incorporate an Iñupiaq language immersion program. There are many courses being offered at the various campuses a part of the University of Alaska system. University of Alaska Fairbanks offers several course in the Iñupiaq language. University of Alaska Anchorage offers multiple levels of Elementary Iñupiaq Language and Alaskan Native language apprenticeship and fluency intensive courses.

Since 2017, a grassroots group of Iñupiaq language learners have organized Iḷisaqativut, a two-week Iñupiaq language intensive that is held throughout communities in the Inupiaq region. The first gathering was held in Utqiaġvik in 2017, Siqnasuaq (Nome) in 2018, and Qikiqtaġruk (Kotzebue) in 2019.

In 2014, linguist and educator Edna Ahgeak MacLean released an Iñupiaq-English dictionary after three decades of research, compiling over 19,000 entries. Kawerak, a nonprofit organization from the Bering Strait region, has created a language glossary that features terms from Iñupiaq, as well as terms from English, Yup'ik, and St. Lawrence Island Yupik.

Several Iñupiat developed pictographic writing systems in the early twentieth century. It is known as Alaskan Picture Writing.

== History ==
Along with other Inuit groups, the Iñupiaq originate from the Thule culture. Circa 300 B.C., the Thule migrated from islands in the Bering Sea to what now is Alaska.

Iñupiaq groups, in common with Inuit-speaking groups, often have a name ending in "miut," which means 'a people of'. One example is the Nunamiut, a generic term for inland Iñupiaq caribou hunters. During a period of starvation and an influenza epidemic, most of these people moved to the coast or other parts of Alaska between 1890 and 1910. A number of Nunamiut returned to the mountains in the 1930s.

By 1950, most Nunamiut groups, such as the Killikmiut, had coalesced in Anaktuvuk Pass, a village in north-central Alaska. Some of the Nunamiut remained nomadic until the 1950s.

The Iditarod Trail's antecedents were the native trails of the Dena'ina and Deg Hit'an Athabaskan American Indians and the Inupiat.

== Subsistence ==
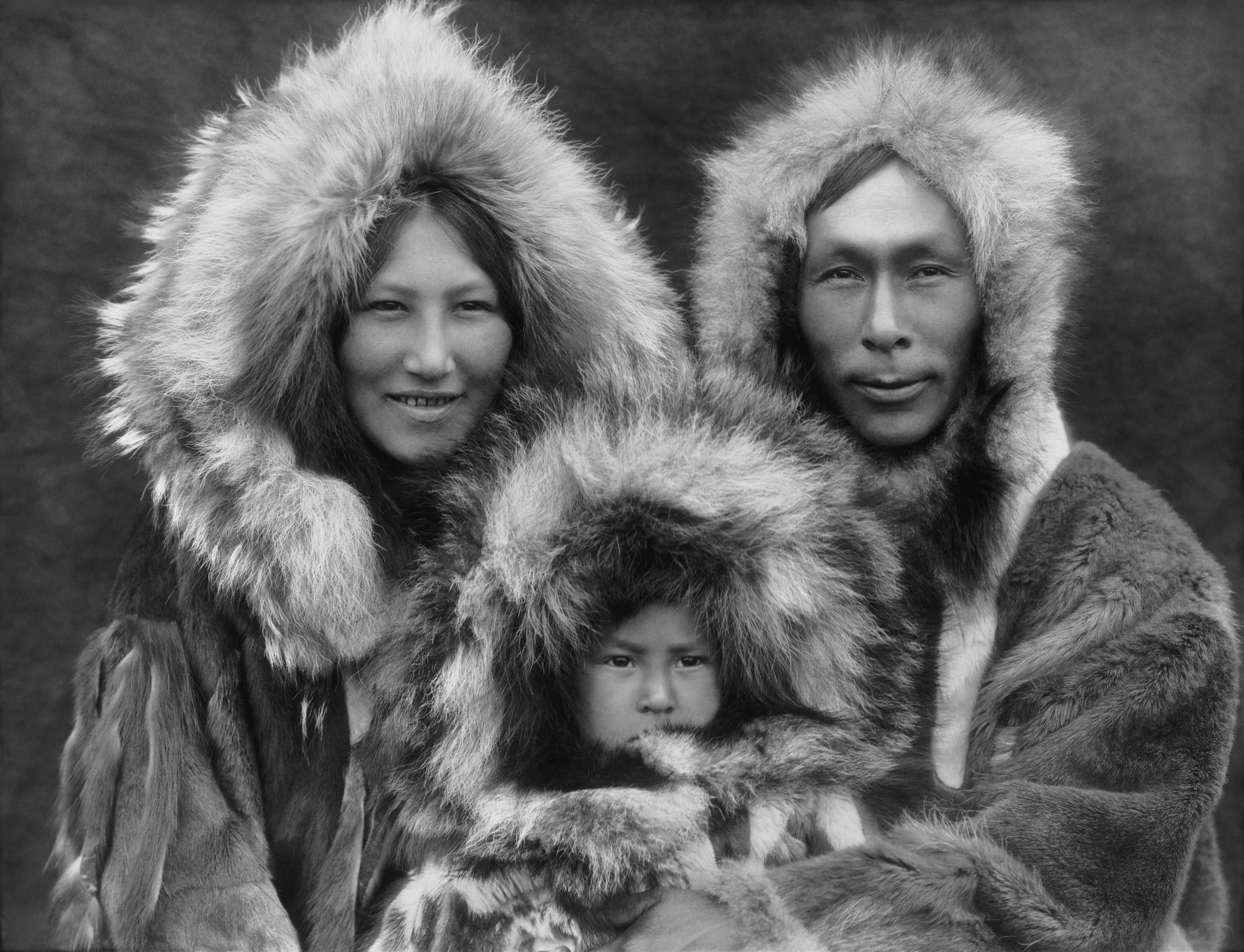
An Inupiat family from Noatak, Alaska, 1929, photograph by Edward S. Curtis

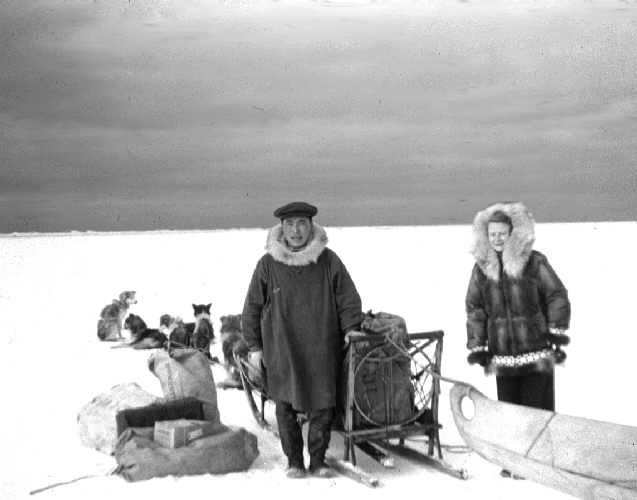
Public Health nurse with Eskimo and dog team preparing to make a call on local residents, 1956

Iñupiat are hunter-gatherers, as are most Arctic peoples. Iñupiat continue to rely heavily on subsistence hunting and fishing. Depending on their location, they harvest walrus, seal, whale, polar bears, caribou, and fish. Both the inland (Nunamiut) and coastal (Tikiġaġmiut) Inupiat depend greatly on fish. Throughout the seasons, when they are available, food staples also include ducks, geese, rabbits, berries, roots, and shoots.

The inland Iñupiat, known as Nunamiut, also hunt caribou, Dall sheep, grizzly bear, and moose. The coastal Inupiat hunt walrus, seals, beluga whales, and bowhead whales. Cautiously, polar bear also is hunted.

The capture of a whale benefits each member of an Iñupiat community, as the animal is butchered and its meat and blubber are allocated according to a traditional formula. Even city-dwelling relatives, thousands of miles away, are entitled to a share of each whale killed by the hunters of their ancestral village. Maktak, which is the skin and blubber of bowhead and other whales, is rich in vitamins A and C. The vitamin C content of meats is destroyed by cooking, so consumption of raw meats and these vitamin-rich foods contributes to good health in a population with limited access to fruits and vegetables.

A major value within subsistence hunting is the utilization of the whole catch or animal. This is demonstrated in the utilization of the hides to turn into clothing, as seen with seal skin, moose and caribou hides, polar bear hides. Fur from rabbits, beaver, marten, otter, and squirrels are also utilized to adorn clothing for warmth. These hides and furs are used to make parkas, mukluks, hats, gloves, and slippers. Qiviut is also gathered as Muskox shed their underlayer of fur and it is spun into wool to make scarves, hats, and gloves. The use of the animal's hides and fur have kept Inupiat warm throughout the harsh conditions of their homelands, as many of the materials provide natural waterproof or windproof qualities. Other animal parts that have been utilized are the walrus intestines that are made into dance drums and qayaq or umiaq, traditional skin boats.

The walrus tusks of ivory and the baleen of bowhead whales are also utilized as Native expressions of art or tools. The use of these sensitive materials are inline with the practice of utilizing the gifts from the animals that are subsisted. There are protective policies on the harvesting of walrus and whales. The harvest of walrus solely for the use of ivory is highly looked down upon as well as prohibited by federal law with lengthy and costly punishments.

Since the 1970s, oil and other resources have been an important revenue source for the Iñupiat. The Alaska Pipeline connects the Prudhoe Bay wells with the port of Valdez in south-central Alaska. Because of the oil drilling in Alaska's arid north, however, the traditional way of whaling is coming into conflict with one of the modern world's most pressing demands: finding more oil.

The Iñupiat eat a variety of berries and when mixed with tallow, make a traditional dessert known as akutaq. They also mix the berries with rosehips and highbush cranberries and boil them into a syrup.

== Culture ==
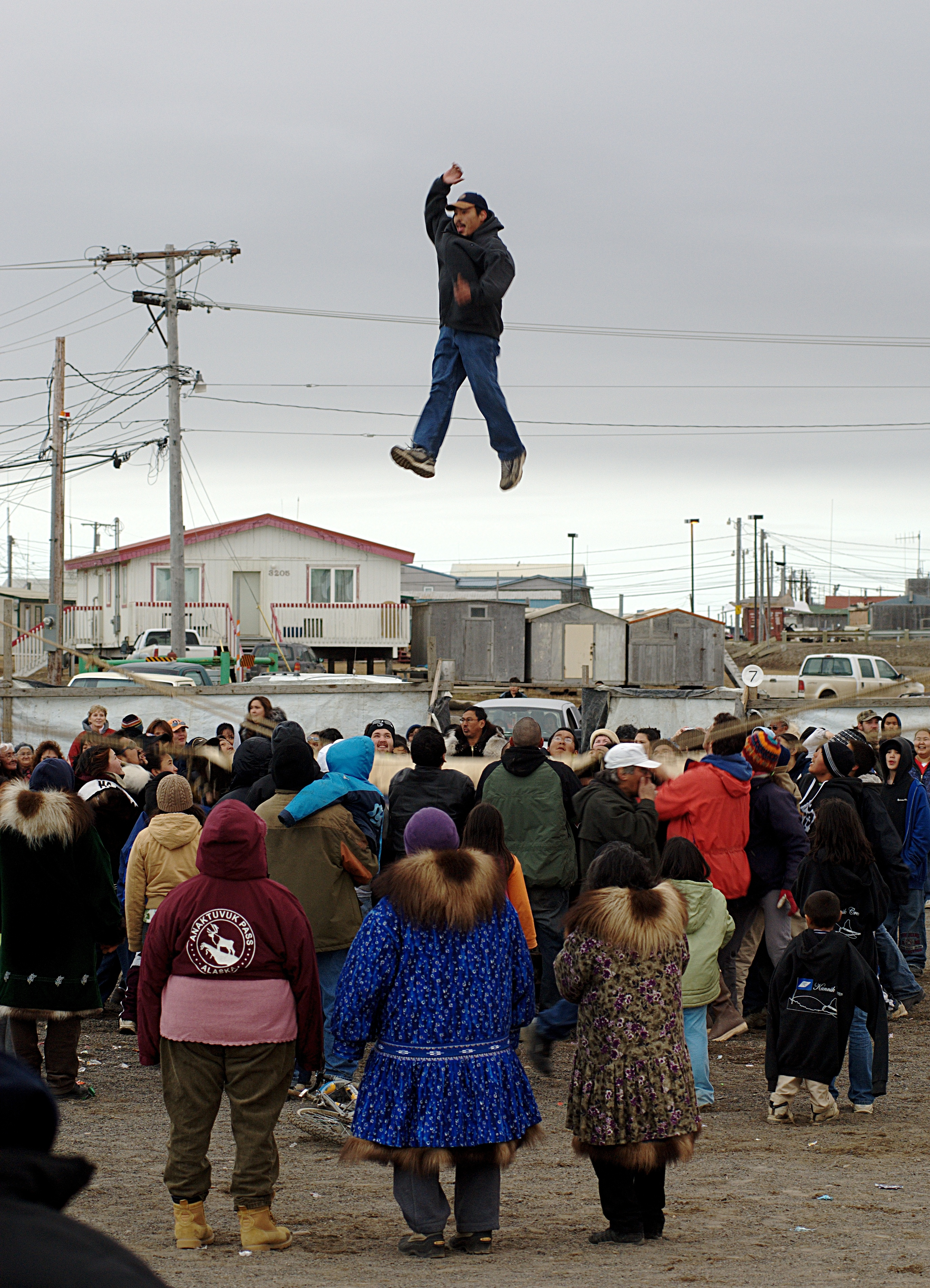
Blanket toss during a Nalukataq in Utqiaġvik, Alaska

Historically, some Iñupiat lived in sedentary communities, while others were nomadic. Some villages in the area have been occupied by Indigenous groups for more than 10,000 years.

The Nalukataq is a spring whaling festival among Inupiat. The festival celebrates traditional whale hunting and honors the whale's spirit as it gave its physical body to feed entire villages. The whale's spirit is honored by dance groups from across the North performing songs and dances.

The Iñupiat Ilitqusiat is a list of values that define Iñupiat. It was created by elders in Kotzebue, Alaska, yet the values resonate with and have been articulated similarly by other Iñupiat communities. These values include: respect for elders, hard work, hunter's success, family roles, humor, respect for nature, knowledge of family tree, respect for others, sharing, love for children, cooperation, avoid conflict, responsibility to tribe, humility, and spirituality.

These values serve as guideposts of how Iñupiat are to live their lives. They inform and can be derived from Iñupiaq subsistence practices.

There is one Iñupiaq culture-oriented institute of higher education, Iḷisaġvik College, located in Utqiaġvik.

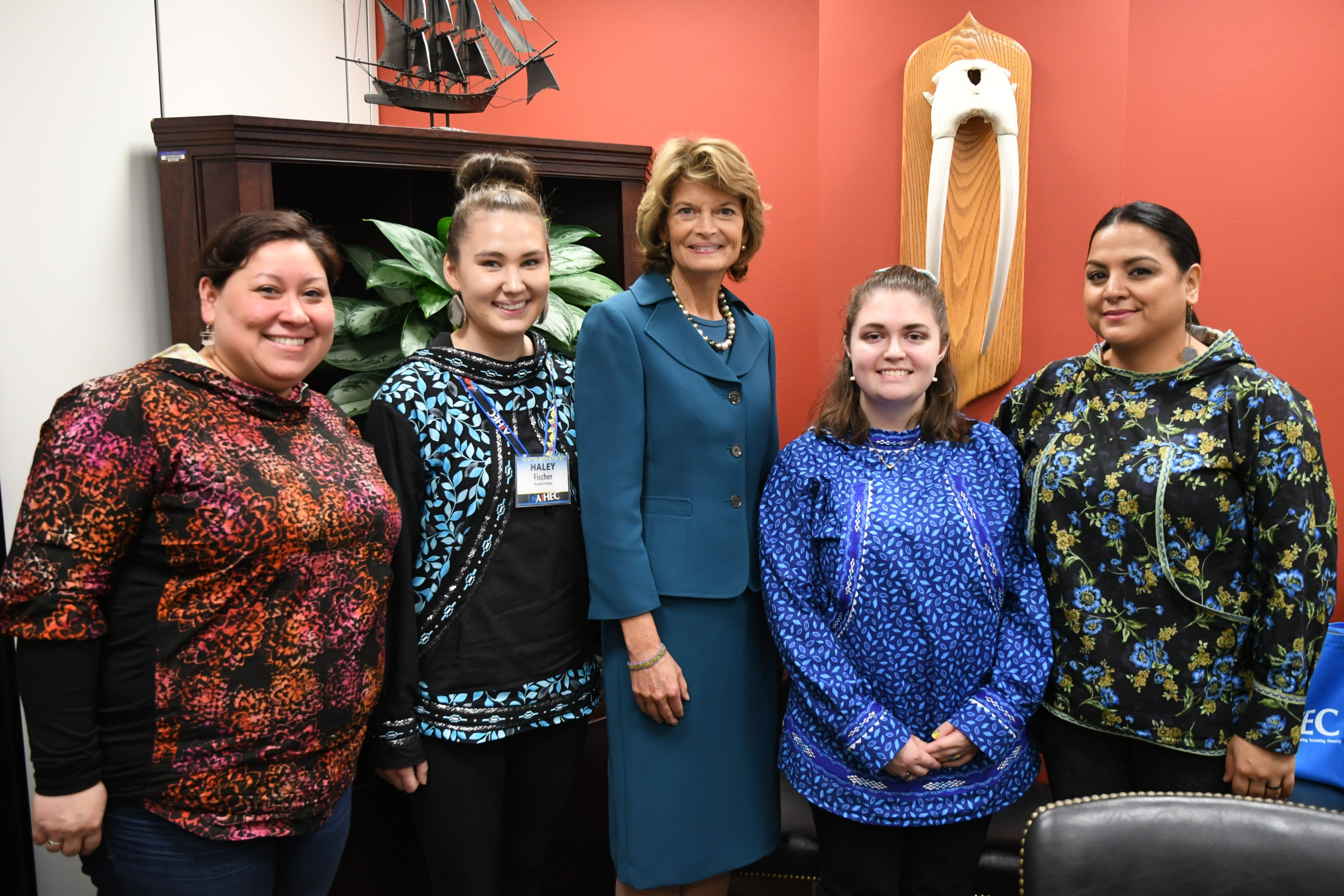
Students dressed in kuspuk from Iḷisaġvik College with Senator Lisa Murkowski.

== Current issues ==
Iñupiat have grown more concerned in recent years that climate change is threatening their traditional lifestyle. The warming trend in the Arctic affects their lifestyle in numerous ways, for example: thinning sea ice makes it more difficult to harvest bowhead whales, seals, walrus, and other traditional foods as it changes the migration patterns of marine mammals that rely on iceflows and the thinning sea ice can result in people falling through the ice; warmer winters make travel more dangerous and less predictable as more storms form; later-forming sea ice contributes to increased flooding and erosion along the coast as there is an increase in fall storms, directly imperiling many coastal villages. The Inuit Circumpolar Council, a group representing Indigenous peoples of the Arctic, has made the case that climate change represents a threat to their human rights.

The emergence of chronic diseases such as diabetes and heart disease, traditionally absent from circumpolar populations, has afflicted the Iñupiat. Obesity rates are now on par with American rates, with some 64% of adults having an at-risk BMI.

As of the 2000 U.S. Census, the Iñupiat population in the United States numbered more than 19,000. Most of them live in Alaska.

== Iñupiat Nunaŋat (Iñupiat territories) ==
The North Slope Borough has the following cities Anaktuvuk Pass (Anaqtuuvak, Naqsraq), Atqasuk (Atqasuk), Utqiaġvik (Utqiaġvik, Ukpiaġvik), Kaktovik (Qaaktuġvik), Nuiqsut (Nuiqsat), Point Hope (Tikiġaq), Point Lay (Kali), Wainwright (Ulġuniq)

Map of Alaska highlighting North Slope Borough

The Northwest Arctic Borough has the following cities Ambler (Ivisaappaat), Buckland (Nunatchiaq, Kaŋiq), Deering (Ipnatchiaq), Kiana (Katyaak, Katyaaq), Kivalina (Kivalliñiq), Kobuk (Laugviik), Kotzebue (Qikiqtaġruk), Noatak (Nuataaq ), Noorvik (Nuurvik), Selawik (Siilvik, Akuligaq ), Shungnak (Isiŋnaq, Nuurviuraq)

Map of Alaska highlighting Northwest Arctic Borough

The Nome Census Area has the following cities Brevig Mission (Sitaisaq, Sinauraq), Diomede (Iŋalik), Golovin (Siŋik), Koyuk (Kuuyuk), Nome (Siqnazuaq, Sitŋasuaq), Shaktoolik (Saqtuliq), Shishmaref (Qigiqtaq), Teller (Tala, Iġaluŋniaġvik), Wales (Kiŋigin), White Mountain (Natchirsvik), Unalakleet (Uŋalaqłiq)

Map of Alaska highlighting Nome Census Area

== Notable Inupiat ==
- Eddie Ahyakak (born 1977), Iñupiaq marathon runner and expert mountaineer on Season Two on Ultimate Survival Alaska
- John Baker (musher), dog musher, pilot and motivational speaker
- Irene Bedard (born 1967), actress
- Ada Blackjack (née Delutuk; 1898–1983), lived for two years as a castaway on uninhabited Wrangel Island north of Siberia
- Ticasuk Brown (1904–1982), educator, poet and writer
- Callan Chythlook-Sifsof (born 1989), Olympic snowboarder
- Alice Qannik Glenn (born 1989), podcaster and producer
- Jeanie Greene, presenter and producer of Heartbeat Alaska and other Alaska Native documentaries
- Agnes Hailstone, profiled in the National Geographic documentary television series Life Below Zero
- William L. Iggiagruk Hensley (born 1941) advocate for Alaska Native rights and U.S. politician; author
- Eben Hopson, politician and founder of the Inuit Circumpolar Council
- Joan Kane, poet
- Sonya Kelliher-Combs (born 1969), mixed media artist of Iñupiaq, Athabascan, German and Irish heritage
- Andrew Okpeaha MacLean, writer, director and filmmaker, known for On the Ice
- Edna Ahgeak MacLean (born 1944), Iñupiaq linguist, anthropologist and educator
- Eileen MacLean (1949–1996), Alaska state legislator and educator
- Ray Mala (1906–1952), actor
- Sadie Neakok, first female magistrate in Alaska
- dg nanouk okpik, poet
- Josiah Patkotak, politician, member of the Alaska House of Representatives
- Simon Paneak, Nunamiut oral historian and namesake for ethnographic museum
- Katherine Paul (born 1989), singer-songwriter of Iñupiaq and Swinomish heritage
- Ryan Redington, dog musher, 2023 Iditarod Trail Sled Dog Race Champion, ambassador of Alaska Native values and traditions
- Shirley Reilly, Team USA athlete, 4-time medalist in the Paralympic Games
- Howard Rock (1911–1976), advocate for Alaska Native land claims, writer, and founder of the Tundra Times
- Ronald Senungetuk (1933–2020), sculptor, silversmith, educator
- Tara Sweeney, 13th Assistant Secretary of the Interior for Indian Affairs
- Kenneth Utuayuk Toovak (1923–2009) ice scientist, Iñupiaq spiritualist and scientist
- Ariel Tweto (born 1987), TV personality, producer and actress, known for her roles on Flying Wild Alaska and Native Shorts, a talk show supported by the Sundance Institute and FNX | First Nations Experience

== See also ==
- Baleen basketry
- Eskimo yo-yo
- Kivgiq, Messenger Feast
- Maniilaq
- Never Alone, a video game featuring Iñupiaq arts and culture
- Qargi, men's community house
