= Nunamiut =

Semi-nomadic inland Iñupiat

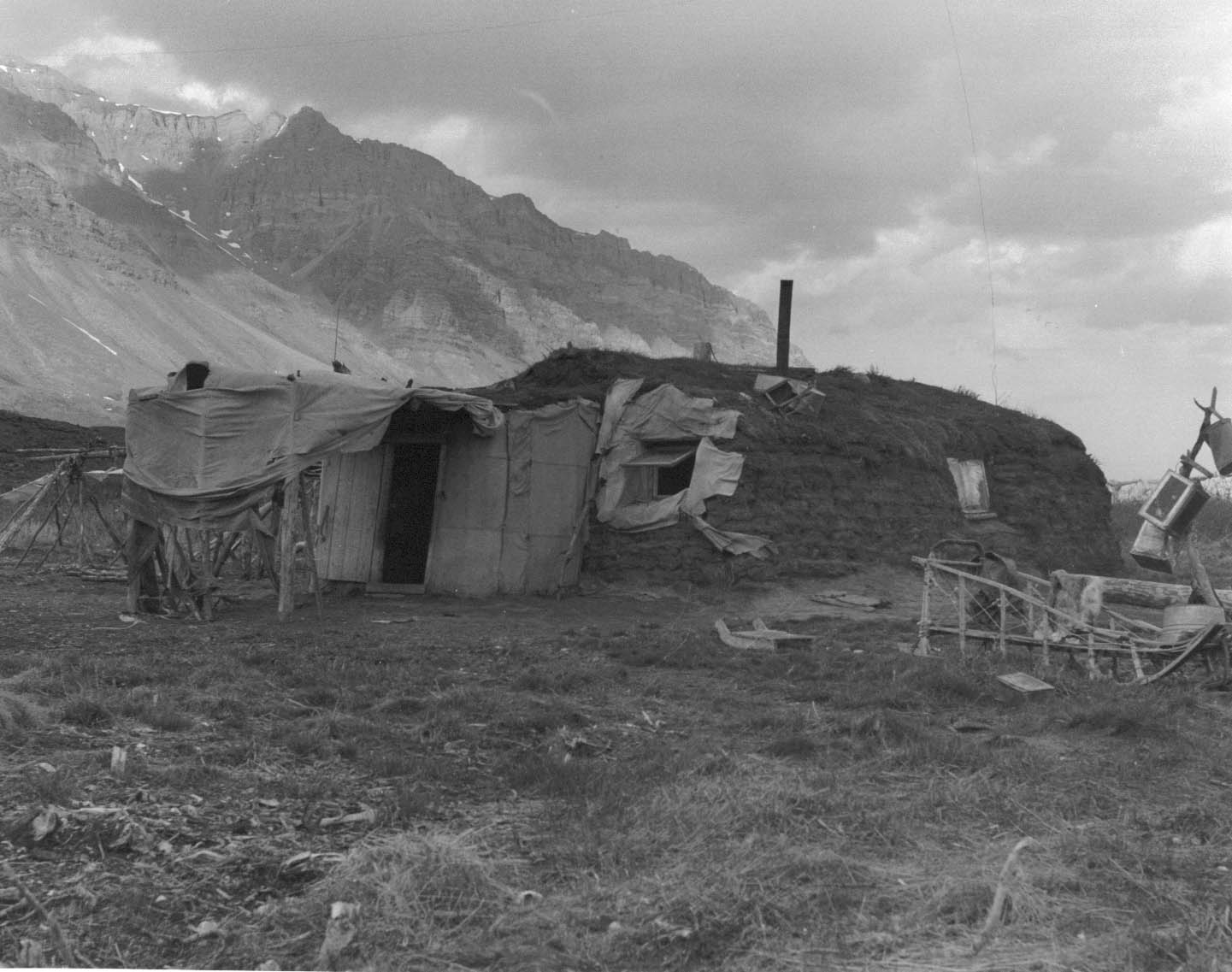
- A sod house (ivrulik) in Anaktuvuk Pass, Alaska in 1957, shortly after the village was established.

Regions with significant populations
- Anaktuvuk Pass, Inland Alaska (United States)

Languages
- Iñupiat language, English

Religion
- Presbyterianism

Related ethnic groups
- Inuit, Iñupiat, Uummarmiut

The Nunamiut or Nunatamiut (Inupiaq: Nunataaġmiut, IPA: [nunɐtaːɴmiut], "People of the Land") are semi-nomadic inland Iñupiat located in the northern and northwestern Alaskan interior, mostly around Anaktuvuk Pass, Alaska.

== History ==
Early Nunamiut lived by hunting caribou instead of the marine mammals and fish hunted by coastal Iñupiat. Traditionally, the Iñupiat do not consider the Nunamiut as a separate ethnic group, but as Inuit who follow an inland rather than a coastal way of life. After 1850 the interior became depopulated because of diseases, the decline of the caribou and the migration to the coast (including the Mackenzie Delta area in Canada, where they are called Uummarmiut) where whaling and fox trapping provided a temporarily promising alternative.

The Nunamiut regularly traded with the coastal Utqiaġvik Iñupiat, going up the Colville river every spring to acquire baleen, maktak, and whale bone.

Historically, the Nunamiut hunted caribou. When caribou numbers dwindled in the 19th century, some Nunamiut migrated towards the Mackenzie River delta. Around 1910, with caribou continuing to be insufficient to sustain the native hunting, Nunatamiut migrated further into the Siglit area. They were spurred by increased demand for furs by the Hudson's Bay Company and the possibility of jobs within the whaling industry. The Inuvialuit of the Siglit area were unhappy with the arrival of the Nunatamiut, afraid that the Nunatamuit would deplete the Inuvialuit's Bluenose caribou herd. But the Nunatamiut, inland hunters of the Iñupiat region, were in high demand by the American whalers.

Eventually, the Nunatamiut who settled in the Siglit area became known as the Uummarmiut (people of the green trees) and intermarried with the local Inuvialuit.

=== The Long Walk ===
In 1938, several Nunamiut families returned to the Brooks Range, around Chandler Lake and the Killik River. Following a deadly influenza outbreak, in the summer of 1949 a group of families in the Killik River area moved 100 miles to Tulugak Lake. Departing from Sulupaat, near the mouth of April Creek on the Killik River, the group included the families of Maptigaq Morry, Inualuuraq (Chris) Hugo, and Homer Mekiana. They traveled on foot with dogs fitted with pack saddles made of caribou, using salvaged military rations when available. This became known by local oral historians as the "Long Walk". After spending the summer around Tulugak Lake, many of the families moved to the present site at the headwaters of the John River, where the village of Anaktuvuk Pass took shape.

This journey marks the merging of independent, nomadic Nunamiut groups into one sedentary lifestyle settlement. By then Nunamiut were among the last Alaska Native ethnic groups to transition away from a nomadic lifestyle. Their settlement tracked broader changes among the Nunamiut in the 1940s, including increased trade for firearms and provisions. The last nomadic family joined them in 1960, and Anaktuvuk Pass remains the only place of communal settlement within the Brooks Range and the only Nunamiut settlement.

== Recording of culture and history ==
The city of Anaktuvuk Pass is home to the Simon Paneak Memorial Museum, which contains local and ethnographic history of the Nunamiut people and their subsequent settlement.

The Nunamiut were visited after World War II by Norwegian explorer and author Helge Ingstad. He stayed for a period in the Brooks Range in northern Alaska among the Nunamiut, and afterward wrote Nunamiut - blant Alaskas innlandseskimoer (translation: "Nunamiut - Inland Eskimos of Alaska"). During the last few years of his life, he worked on categorizing and annotating the large quantity of photos and audio recordings (141 songs) he had made while living with the Nunamiut in 1950. The effort resulted in a booklet, Songs of the Nunamiut, with an accompanying CD containing the audio material. This is an extremely valuable contribution to the preservation of the Nunamiut culture because it turned out that much of what he had gathered in the mid-20th century was now lost locally and was only preserved in his recordings. Representatives from the Nunamiut later suggested naming a mountain in the Brooks range after him. Five years after Ingstad's death, it was named Ingstad mountain.

=== Culture ===
According to archaeologist Lewis Binford, the Nunamiut depend on meat more so than any other living hunter-gatherer group. The annual cycle of Nunamiut life revolves around the annual migrations of caribou.

Spring: The main caribou migrations happen in March and April, when caribou move north through Anaktuvuk Pass to feed on the plains.

Summer: The plains thaw and become a marshland swarming with blackflies and mosquitoes.

Autumn: The caribou hunting cycle repeats in September and October when caribou retreat south again.

Winter: There are about 72 days of total winter darkness starting around November 15.

=== Language ===
The native language of the Nunamiut is a dialect of Iñupiaq. In the late 1960s, the University of California, Berkeley sent undergraduate linguistics student (now Arctic explorer) Dennis Schmitt to the Nunamiut to study their dialect. There are few native speakers today.
