= Peters =

Peters may refer to:

== People ==
- Peters (surname)
- Peters First Nation, a First Nations band in British Columbia, Canada

== Places ==
=== United States ===
- Peters, California, a census-designated place
- Peters, Florida, a town
- Peters Township, Kingman County, Kansas
- Peters, an unincorporated community in Casco Township, St. Clair County, Michigan
- Peters Township, Franklin County, Pennsylvania
- Peters Township, Washington County, Pennsylvania
- Peters, Texas, an unincorporated area
- Peters Mountain, in Virginia and West Virginia
- Peters Glacier (Alaska Range), Alaska
- Peters Glacier (Brooks Range), Alaska
- Peters Canyon, Orange County, California
- Peters Reservation, Massachusetts, a nature reserve
- Peters Park (Boston)
- Peters River, in Massachusetts and Rhode Island
- Peters Brook (disambiguation)
- Peters Creek (California)
- Peters Creek (Pennsylvania)

=== Elsewhere ===
- Peters Peak, Ross Dependency, Antarctica
- Peters Butte, Marie Byrd Land, Antarctica
- Peters Glacier (South Georgia), South Georgia Island, Atlantic Ocean
- Peters (crater), on the Moon
- Peters Bay, NE Greenland
- Peters Village, Kent

== In business ==
- Edition Peters, a German music publishing house, also known as C.F. Peters Musikverlag
- Peters (bakery) a bakery chain in the United Kingdom
- Peters Bookselling Services, a specialist children's bookseller in Birmingham UK
- Peters Cartridge Company, a former gunpowder and ammunition producer in Kings Mills, Ohio
- Peters Fashions, a family-run department store in Huddersfield, West Yorkshire, England
- Peters Ice Cream, an Australian ice cream brand now owned by Nestlé

== See also ==
- Peter's Food Services, a Welsh food company
- Peters Bastion, a mountain in Palmer Land, Antarctica
- Peters Dome, a mountain in Alaska
- Peter (disambiguation)
- Justice Peters (disambiguation)
