= Peters Glacier =

Peters Glacier could mean:

- Peters Glacier (Alaska Range), a major glacier of the Alaska Range north of Denali
- Peters Glacier (Brooks Range), a glacier of the Brooks Range in Alaska
- Peters Glacier (South Georgia) on the island of South Georgia
