= William John Peters =

American explorer and scientist

William John Peters (February 5, 1863 – July 10, 1942) was an American explorer and scientist who worked extensively in the Arctic and tropics. His significant contributions the study of geomagnetism at sea in the early 1900s helped lay the foundation for the current scientific understanding of Earth's magnetism.

William J. Peters, Courtesy of Carnegie Institution of Washington, Department of Terrestrial Magnetism

== Early life ==
Born in Oakland, California, in 1863, Peters was son of William Bonaventure Peters and Margaret Major. He took courses in botany and chemistry at the University of California, Berkeley. Before obtaining his degree, he was recruited to conduct boundary surveys in some western states with his uncles, the Major brothers. From 1884 to 1898, Peters worked as a topographer for the United States Geological Survey, primarily in the western states, including California, the Dakotas, Iowa, Kansas, and Nebraska.

== Arctic exploration ==
From 1898 to 1902, Peters continued his work for the United States Geological Survey, mostly in Alaska, where he worked with Alfred Brooks exploring the White and Tanana River basins (Brooks 1900, Brown 1984). They traveled by foot and dog teams more than 1,600 mi (2,600 km) across difficult terrain and harsh climate. Numerous topographic features in Alaska were named after William Peters, including Peters Basin, Peters Dome, Peters Glacier, and Peters Pass north-northwest of Denali Peak and Lake Peters and Peters Glacier in the Brooks Range.

In 1901, the Schrader-Peters expedition explored the John River, the Anaktuvuk River, and then continued onwards to Point Barrow.

Peters was the National Geographic Society's representative, Chief of the Science Staff, and Second in Command to Anthony Fiala on the Ziegler Arctic Expedition (1903–1905). The main goal of the expedition was to reach the North Pole or farther than the record of 86 degrees, 34 minutes, north, set by Umberto Cagni, Captain of the Italian expedition led by Prince Luigi Amedeo, Duke of Abruzzi (Fiala 1906). Due to extraordinarily challenging ice conditions in both 1904 and 1905, the expedition could not progress much north of their home base, Franz Josef Land, north of Russia. However, the scientific information Peters and his staff collected, including geomagnetic, aurora, astronomical, tide, and weather observations (Ziegler Polar Expedition 1907), contributed significantly to our knowledge of Arctic science.

== Work with the Carnegie Institution ==
Peters found his interest in the Earth's magnetic forces closely aligned with the Department of Terrestrial Magnetism (DTM) of the Carnegie Institution of Washington, which had begun a program to conduct magnetic surveys of all of Earth's oceans. Such an ambitious project contributed not only to theoretical knowledge, but also to practical application of correcting errors in magnetic charts. With his navigational skills, scientific experience, and adventuresome spirit, Peters was well suited for his next assignment.

In January 1906, the DTM selected Peters to be Commander of the Galilee and Chief Magnetic Observer. During two cruises, totalling 53,263 nautical miles (98,643 km; 61,294 mi), primarily in the Pacific Ocean, Peters invented a specialized compass used for making declination determinations. The Galilee, constructed with some magnetic materials, produced disturbing effects on observations. The DTM, therefore, built a new non-magnetic ship, the Carnegie.

Peters commanded the first two cruises of the Carnegie between 1909 and 1913, the first of which included 9,200 NM (17,000 km; 10,600 mi) within the Atlantic Ocean. The second cruise, totaling 92,829 NM (171,919 km; 106,826 mi) and lasting three years, occurred primarily in the tropical areas of the Atlantic, Indian, and Pacific Oceans. During this cruise, Peters and his colleagues found and corrected many magnetic chart errors, which greatly benefited navigators in these oceans.

In 1914, Peters returned to the north as commander of an expedition to Labrador, Hudson Bay, and Hudson Strait aboard the Grenfell Mission's schooner, George B. Cluett, the vessel that would later, in 1915, carry supplies for Arctic explorer, Donald B. MacMillan and the Crocker Land Expedition. In spite of exceedingly difficult wind, ice, and temperature conditions, Peters continued to complete magnetic observations on land and at sea.

After his return in 1914, Peters continued his work with DTM in Washington, D. C. until he retired from active duty in 1934. However, with over fifty scientific papers to his name, Peters continued to assist with various research projects, including for the British Admiralty (Fleming 1942). Harradon (1942) summed up Peters' role in laying the foundation of our current knowledge: "The work of the Galilee and Carnegie is one of the outstanding achievements in the history of geomagnetism, particularly as it will serve as a prototype of similar projects, like that of the Research, which may be undertaken in the future. The prominent part played by Captain Peters is reflected in every aspect of this great work from the planning and preparation to the actual accomplishment of the early cruises and the discussion of the final results for publication. Few geophysicists have accomplished more in establishing the premises upon which others have built fruitful theories in the attempt to solve the difficult problems encountered in the investigation of the Earth's magnetism."

== Memberships ==
- Aeroarctic
- American Association for the Advancement of Science
- American Geophysical Union
- American Section of the International Union of Radio Science
- Arts Club of Washington
- Cosmos Club
- Ends of the Earth Club
- Philosophical Society of Washington
- National Academy of Sciences

== Family ==
On September 2, 1908, Peters married Beatrice Speaight Boyd, daughter of William Augustus Boyd and Adeline Todd Speaight. They had one son, Geoffrey Lloyd Peters, and seven grandchildren: William T. Peters, Melody Peters, Catherine Peters Ortega, Geoffrey Peters, Chela Zabin, Atiq Zabinski, and Manuel Peters.
