= Peters Creek =

Peters Creek and Peter Creek may refer to:

== Communities ==
- Chugiak, Alaska, includes a community named Peters Creek
- Peters Creek, Illinois
- Peter Creek, Kentucky
- Peters Creek Township, Stokes County, North Carolina

== Streams ==
- Peters Creek (California)
- Peter Creek (Missouri)
- Peters Creek (Twelvemile Creek), a stream in Missouri
- Peters Creek (Montana), a stream in Flathead County
- Peters Creek (Pennsylvania)
- Peters Creek (Victoria)

== Roads ==
- Peters Creek Parkway, North Carolina
- Virginia State Route 117, known as Peters Creek Road

== See also ==
- Peters Brook (disambiguation)
