= John River (Alaska) =

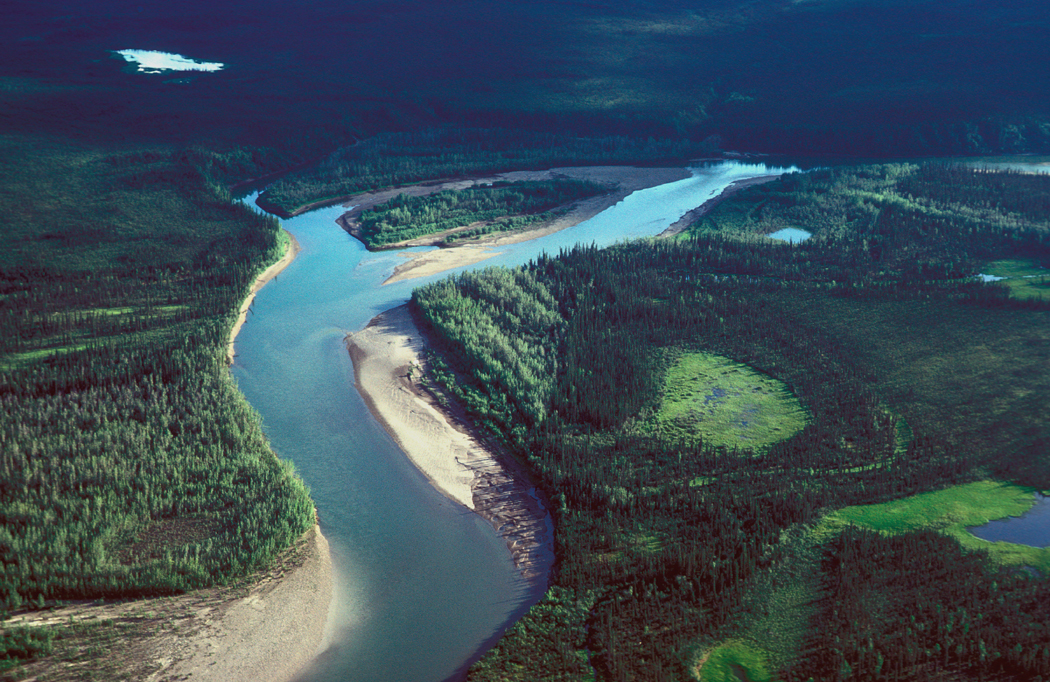
- John River near Bettles

- Location of the mouth of the John River in Alaska
- Etymology: John Bremner
- Native name: Atchiiniq (Inupiaq)

Location
- Country: United States
- State: Alaska
- District: North Slope Borough, Yukon–Koyukuk Census Area

Physical characteristics
- Source: confluence of Contact and Inukpasugruk creeks
  - location: Endicott Mountains, Brooks Range, North Slope Borough
  - coordinates: 68°07′34″N 151°45′23″W
  - elevation: 2,076 ft (633 m)
- Mouth: Koyukuk River
  - location: 1 mile (2 km) northeast of Bettles, Yukon–Koyukuk Census Area
  - coordinates: 66°54′49″N 151°39′13″W
  - elevation: 600 ft (180 m)
- Length: 125 mi (201 km)

National Wild and Scenic River
- Type: Wild
- Designated: December 2, 1980

The John River (Iñupiaq: Atchiiniq) is a 125-mile (201 km) tributary of the Koyukuk River in the northern part of the U.S. state of Alaska. It was named after John Bremner, a prospector and explorer who was one of the first non-native persons to go there. It flows south from Anaktuvuk Pass in Alaska's Brooks Range, into the larger river at a point near Bettles, slightly north of the Arctic Circle.

In 1980, the 52-mile (84 km) segment of the John River within the Gates of the Arctic National Park and Preserve were designated "wild" and added to the National Wild and Scenic Rivers System. The designation means that the segment is unpolluted, free-flowing, and generally inaccessible except by trail.

The John River Valley is an important migration route for Arctic caribou.

== History ==
In 1901, the Schrader-Peters expedition explored the John River, the Anaktuvuk River, and continued onward to Point Barrow. In 1931, Robert "Bob" Marshall explored the John River up to the Arctic Divide, and described seeing a "quadruple rainbow".

== Boating ==
It is possible to run the John River in canoes, kayaks, and small rafts, though conditions vary from place to place. The upper 35 miles (56 km) are rated Class III (difficult) on the International Scale of River Difficulty and "should be attempted only by experienced paddlers with solid wilderness skills." Below this, the river is rated Class II (medium) for the next 47 miles (76 km), then Class I on the lower reaches all the way to the mouth. Dangers on the upper river include sustained whitewater, swift currents, a difficult 4-mile (6 km) portage, and the possibility of water too shallow to run.

== See also ==
- List of rivers of Alaska
- List of National Wild and Scenic Rivers
