= Price Glacier =

Price Glacier may refer to:

- Price Glacier (Antarctica)
- Price Glacier (Mount Shuksan), a glacier on Mount Shuksan, North Cascades National Park, USA
