= Peters Brook =

Peters Brook may refer to the following in the U.S. state of New Jersey:

- Peters Brook (Raritan River), a tributary of the Raritan River
- Peters Brook (Stony Brook), a tributary of Stony Brook
- A variant name of Woodsville Brook, a tributary of Stony Brook

== See also ==
- Peters Creek (disambiguation)
