= Honey Branch =

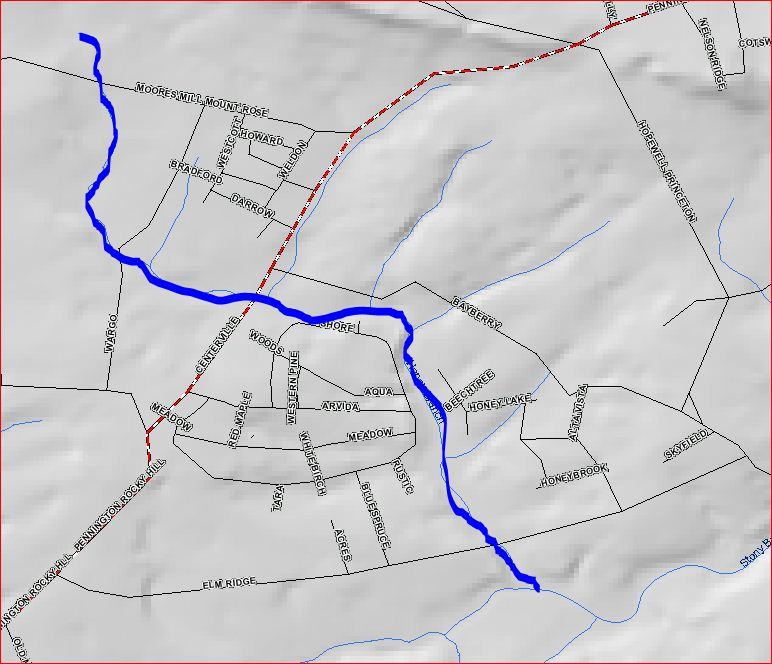
- Map of Honey Branch

Location
- Country: United States

Physical characteristics
- Source
  - coordinates: 40°22′15″N 74°46′6″W
- Mouth
  - coordinates: 40°20′17″N 74°44′29″W
  - elevation: 112 ft (34 m)

Basin features
- Progression: Stony Brook (Millstone River), Millstone River, Raritan River, Atlantic Ocean
- River system: Raritan River system

Honey Branch is a tributary of the Stony Brook in Mercer County, New Jersey in the United States.

== Course ==
The Honey Branch starts at 40°22′15″N 74°46′6″W. It flows southeast, crossing Moores Mill Mt. Rose Road. It then turns east and flows across Pennington-Rocky Hill Road. It picks up several tributaries and drains into the Stony Brook Fourteen Basin. After the basin, it crosses Elm Ridge Road and drains into the Stony Brook at 40°20′17″N 74°44′29″W, near Rosedale Park.

== Sister tributaries ==
- Baldwins Creek
- Duck Pond Run
- Lewis Brook
- Peters Brook
- Stony Brook Branch
- Woodsville Brook

== See also ==
- List of rivers of New Jersey
