= Anaktuvuk River =

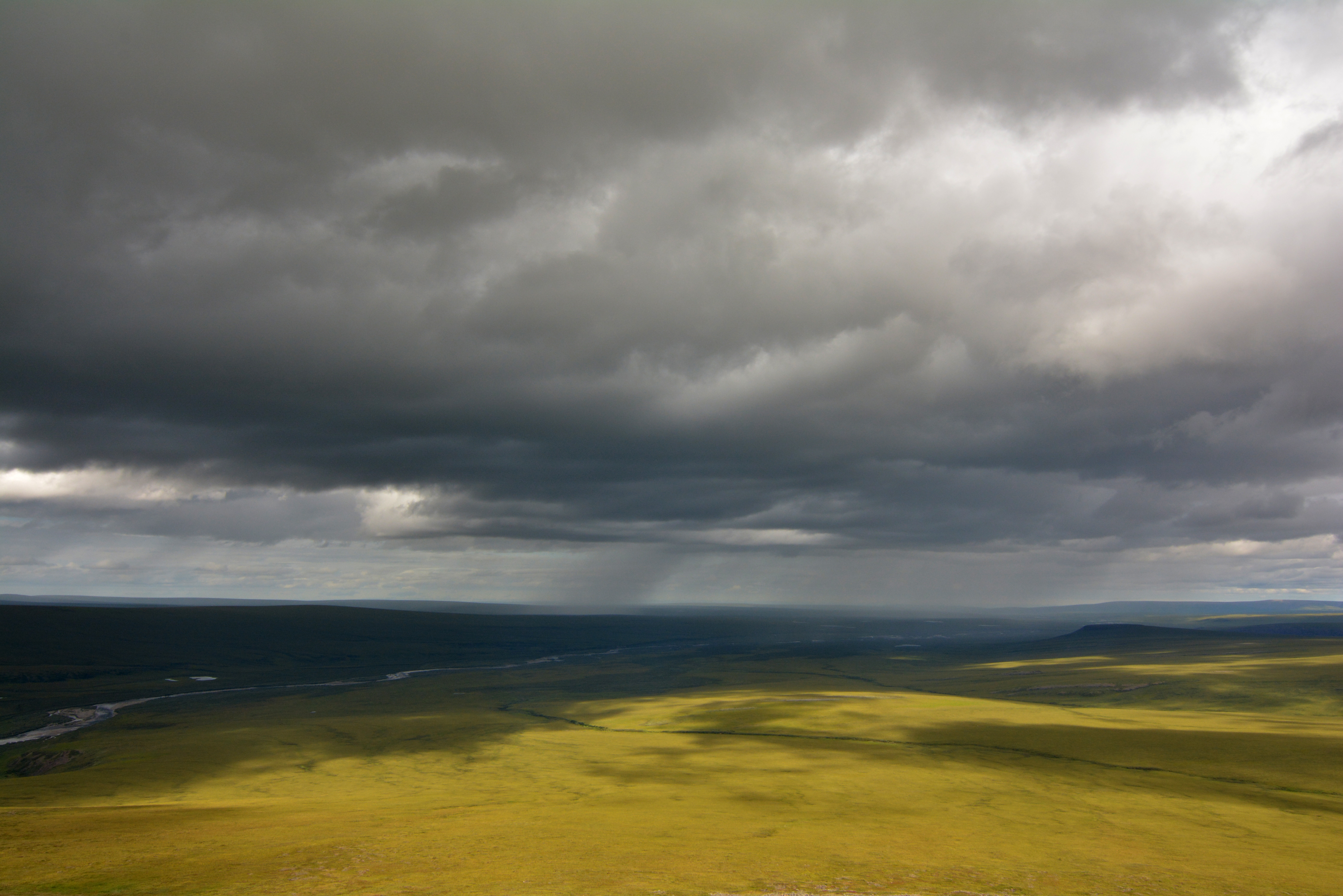
- The Anaktuvuk River winds through the sweeping tundra hills of Alaska's North Slope region.

- Location of the mouth of the Anaktuvuk River in Alaska
- Native name: Anaqtuuvak (Inupiaq)

Location
- Country: United States
- State: Alaska
- Borough: North Slope

Physical characteristics
- Source: Fan Mountain glacier
  - coordinates: 68°08′48″N 150°58′31″W
  - elevation: 6,019 ft (1,835 m)
- Mouth
  - location: Colville River near Umiat
  - coordinates: 69°30′47″N 151°26′39″W
  - elevation: 153 ft (47 m)
- Length: 135 mi (217 km)

The Anaktuvuk River (Inupiaq: Anaqtuuvak) is a river in Alaska's North Slope. One hundred and thirty-five miles (217 km) long, it flows west from glaciers in the Endicott Mountains changing direction just north of Anaktuvuk Pass to flow north to the Arctic Coastal Plain where it joins the Colville River. Its headwaters are formed by runoff from various glaciers in the Gates of the Arctic Wilderness on the slopes of Fan Mountain, Alapah Mountain and Limestack Mountain, the last of which lies on the watershed divide between the Arctic Coastal Plain and the Koyukuk River, and feeds the Anaktuvuk River via Graylime Creek. Its first major tributary is the John River which joins it at 68°12′14″N 151°36′50″W. The Nanushuk River joins it at 69°18′11″N 150°59′58″W.

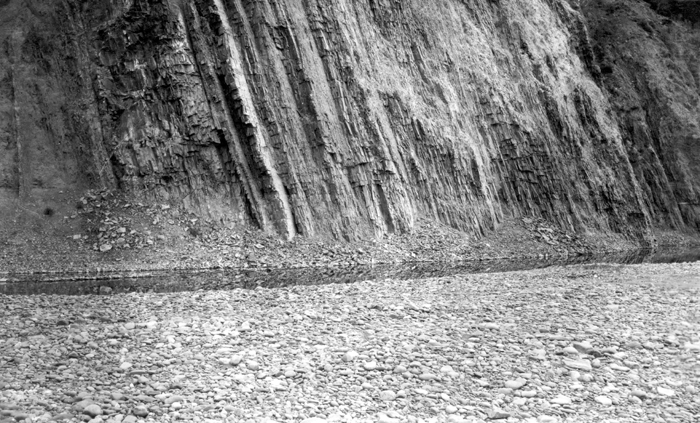
Photo by F.C. Schrader for the United States Geological Survey, 1901

"The first geologic transect of the Arctic Slope was conducted during the summer of 1901 by USGS geologist F.C. Schrader and topographer W.J. Peters, who descended the Anaktuvuk River in canoes to its junction with the Colville River." In 1938, Robert "Bob" Marshall explored the sources of the river.

== Human use ==
Though the vast majority of the river is often inaccessible to motorized boats due to very low water levels, portions of the river provide excellent fishing ground for Arctic char and "monster grayling". Hunters may fly into the Anaktuvuk River drainage in summer to hunt moose, bears, caribou, and other animals. In August 2013, a hunter was severely mauled by a grizzly bear while hunting in the Anaktuvuk River drainage. Because of its low and fluctuating water levels, extreme remoteness, lack of airports, and challenging weather conditions, the Anaktuvuk River is only very rarely run by recreational boaters.

== Wildlife ==
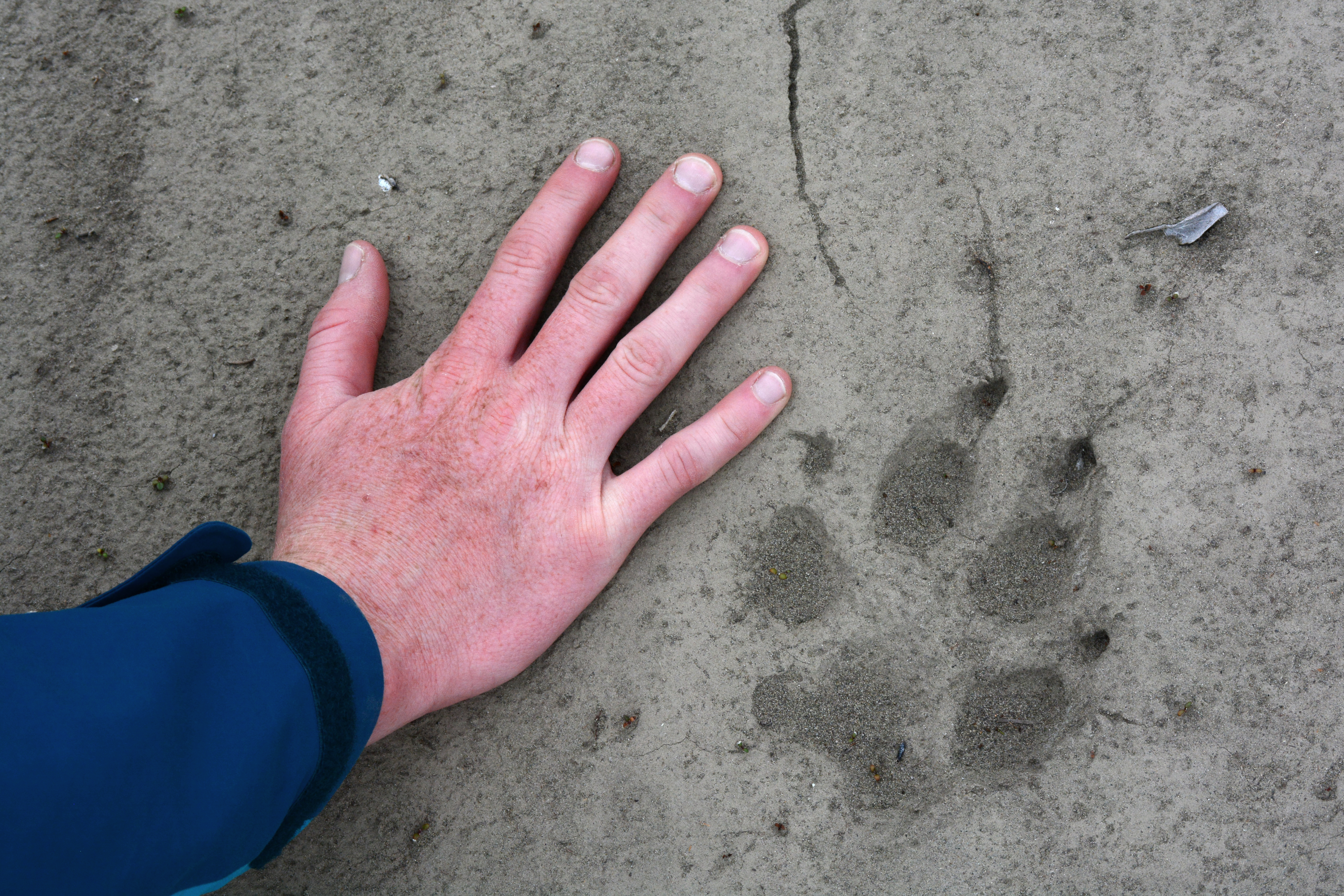
A packrafter puts her hand alongside a wolf print on the Anaktuvuk River. North Slope, Alaska

Because of its extremely remote location, the Anaktuvuk River remains in an almost completely unaltered wilderness state. Shrub forests areas along the middle and lower Anaktuvuk River provide some of the little moose habitat on the largely treeless North Slope region. The Anaktuvuk River drainage is also home to grizzly bears, caribou, wolves, and many small mammals. Migrating birds such as yellow-billed loons and Canada goose raise their young along the river.

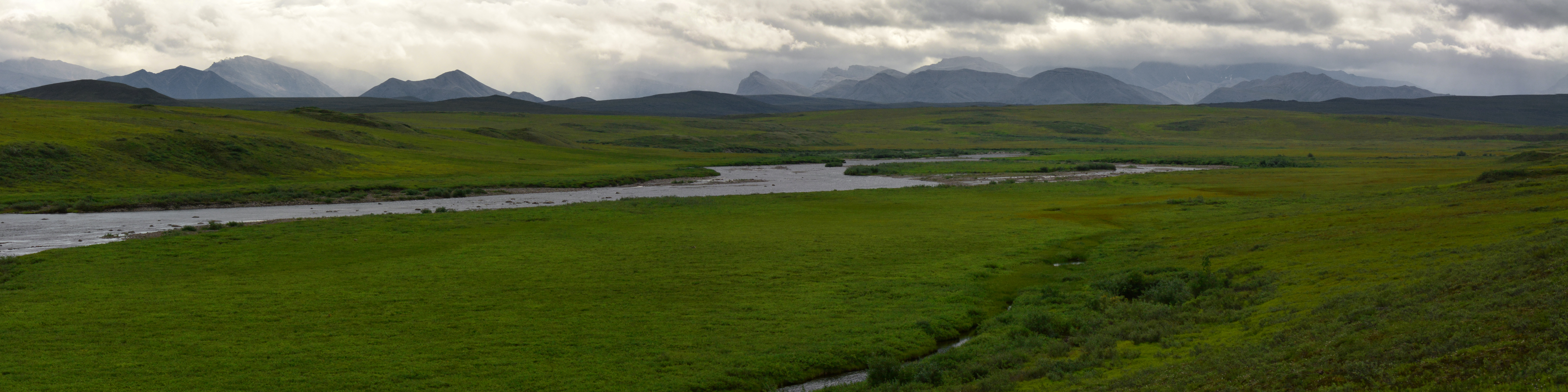
The Anaktuvuk River flows North out of the Brooks Range mountains.

== See also ==
- List of rivers of Alaska
