= Lewis Brook (New Jersey) =

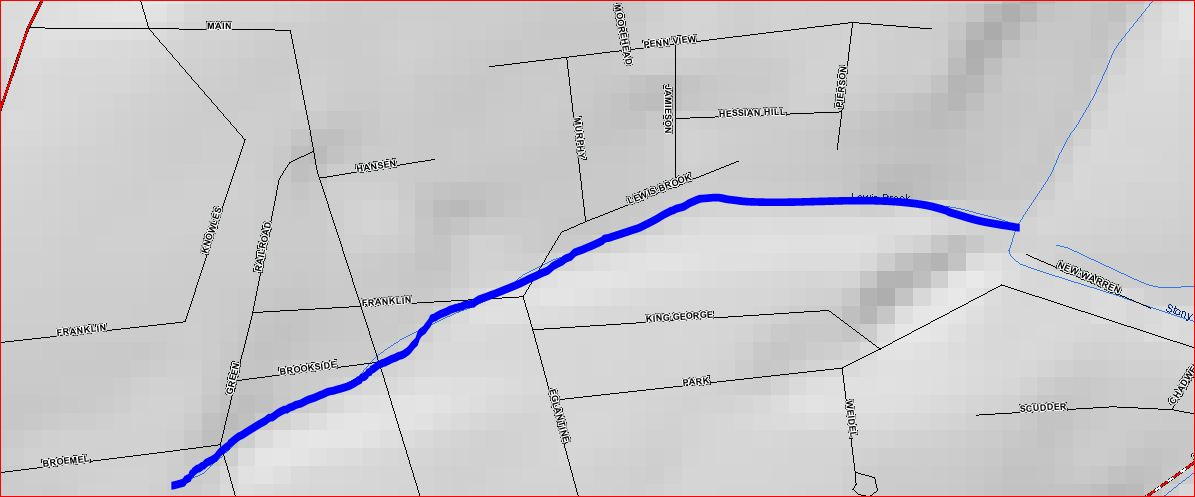
- Map of Lewis Brook

Location
- Country: United States

Physical characteristics
- Source
  - coordinates: 40°19′45″N 74°47′45″W
- Mouth
  - coordinates: 40°20′0″N 74°46′54″W
  - elevation: 141 ft (43 m)

Basin features
- Progression: Stony Brook (Millstone River), Millstone River, Raritan River, Atlantic Ocean
- River system: Raritan River system

Lewis Brook is a tributary of the Stony Brook in Mercer County, New Jersey in the United States.

== Course ==
Lewis Brook starts at 40°19′45″N 74°47′45″W, near the Pennington Shopping Center. It flows eastward, crossing North Main Street, before draining into the Stony Brook at 40°20′0″N 74°46′54″W.

== Sister tributaries ==
- Baldwins Creek
- Duck Pond Run
- Honey Branch
- Peters Brook
- Stony Brook Branch
- Woodsville Brook

== See also ==
- List of rivers of New Jersey
