= Lake Carnegie (New Jersey) =

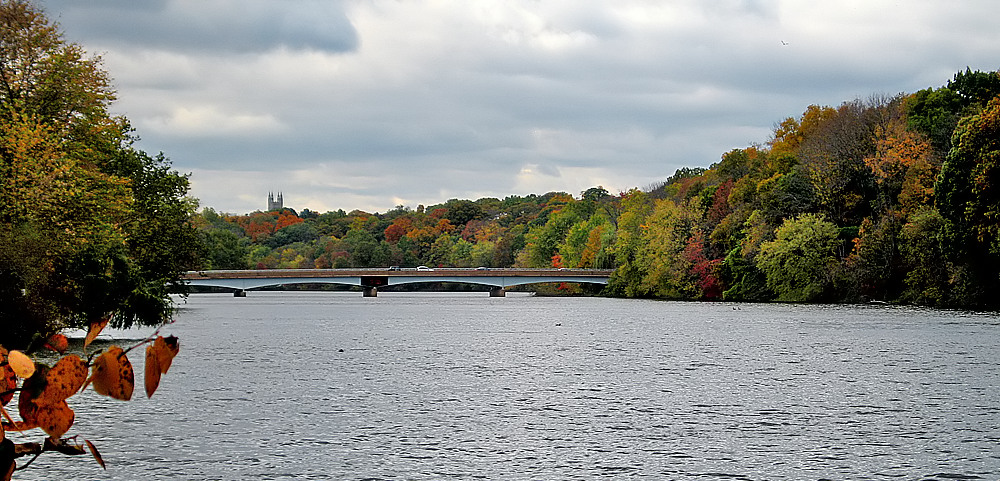
- The lake, with Princeton University's Cleveland Tower in the background

- Location within New Jersey Location within the United States
- Location: Mercer / Middlesex counties, New Jersey, US
- Coordinates: 40°22′13.39″N 74°37′17.57″W
- Type: Reservoir
- Primary inflows: Millstone River
- Primary outflows: Millstone River
- Basin countries: United States
- Lake Carnegie Historic District
- U.S. National Register of Historic Places
- U.S. Historic district
- New Jersey Register of Historic Places
- Location within Mercer County, New Jersey Location within New Jersey Location within the United States
- Location: Roughly bounded by Lake Carnegie shoreline from Conrail bridge at W end to dam W of Kingston at E end, Princeton, New Jersey
- Area: 262 acres (106 ha)
- Built: 1906
- Architect: Pennington Satterthwaite (boathouse)
- Landscape architect: Howard Russell Butler
- Architectural style: Mission Gothic
- NRHP reference No.: 90001000
- NJRHP No.: 1747

Significant dates
- Added to NRHP: June 28, 1990
- Designated NJRHP: January 22, 1990

Lake Carnegie is a reservoir that straddles the borders of the towns of Princeton, West Windsor, Plainsboro and South Brunswick in Mercer and Middlesex counties in central New Jersey. The lake was created by construction of a dam along the Millstone River, though the lower portion of the lake actually follows the valley of its largest tributary, the Stony Brook. The Delaware and Raritan Canal and its associated tow path are situated along the eastern shore of the lake. Noted businessman and philanthropist Andrew Carnegie donated money for the construction of the lake, which was donated to Princeton University. In 1990, the Lake Carnegie Historic District was listed on the National Register of Historic Places.

The lake, which is privately owned, is used by the university's rowing team, and is home to the US Olympic rowing team. It is, however, available for public use for activities such as ice skating, fishing, and picnicking. Fish species include largemouth bass, carp, pickerel, crappie, channel catfish and occasionally a few rainbow and brown trout that make their way into Carnegie Lake from Stony Brook. Years of pollution have led to a dangerous decrease in the lake's safety levels. Efforts to improve the water quality of Carnegie Lake are ongoing.

An aerial view of this lake appears in the opening title sequence of the drama series House M.D.

== History ==
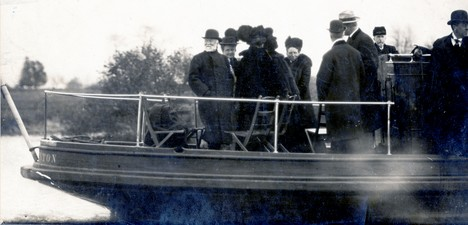
Andrew Carnegie (left) and Princeton University officials at Lake Carnegie's dedication ceremony on December 5, 1906.

Prior to the construction of the lake, Princeton's varsity crew rowed on the narrow Delaware and Raritan Canal, sharing the busy waterway with commercial shipping. The team had discussed their desire to construct a lake in Princeton, but no plans were ever developed. In 1902, one of the team's former members (Howard Russell Butler, class of 1876) was asked to paint a portrait of noted philanthropist Andrew Carnegie.

While sitting for Butler, Carnegie discussed the many lochs he had built in his native Scotland. Butler relayed the plans he and his teammates had discussed previously to Carnegie, who took an immediate interest in the project. He asked Butler to investigate the potential cost and feasibility of constructing such a lake in Princeton. After working with a New York engineering company, Butler informed Carnegie that the estimated construction costs would be US$118,000.

Carnegie visited the university campus to view the construction site, and soon after authorized Butler to begin construction. In 1903, a group of Princeton alumni began purchasing farmland that occupied areas of the projected basin. They, in turn, sold this land to Carnegie. This was done in order to avoid arousing the suspicions of local residents, and to allow Carnegie to purchase the land for the lowest possible price. By 1905, the needed land was purchased and the work of clearing the area and constructing the bridges and dam began.

Carnegie attended the official opening ceremony on December 5, 1906, arriving by train with dozens of friends. He was met by a group including university president Woodrow Wilson. Carnegie and Wilson led an academic procession into Alexander Hall, where Carnegie was greeted enthusiastically by attending students (who had been given the day off). At one point, a group of students began to sing:

Carnegie, Carnegie

He is giving us a lake
You can hear the breakers break;
Carnegie, Carnegie
Andy, Andy, you're a dandy

Carnegie.

Carnegie returned to Princeton the following spring to attend the lake's first regatta. Wilson attempted to secure a second donation from Carnegie, who answered, "I have already given you a lake." Wilson's reported reply was, "We needed bread and you gave us cake."

Albert Einstein sailed often on Lake Carnegie during his years in Princeton which began in 1933.

== Environmental problems ==
Due to its initially shallow depth, flooding and siltation (carried by Stony Brook) became problems for the area surrounding Carnegie Lake. Another problem was the rapid deposit of sewage carried by the Millstone River from nearby towns, where expansion of treatment facilities had not kept pace with rapid population growth. The lake has been dredged three times since its opening—first in 1927, in the late 1930s, and most recently in 1971. The 1971 dredging gave the lake a uniform depth of nine feet at a distance of 35 feet from the shoreline.

In its 2002 report on water quality, the United States Environmental Protection Agency rated Lake Carnegie as "impaired." This status indicates that the lake cannot support one or more of its designated uses. The sources of this nonpoint source pollution are varied—litter, chemicals (fertilizers and pesticides), automotive waste (oil and gas), and goose droppings have all contributed to the decline in water quality. Unsafe levels of mercury in the lake have led to an advisory on fish consumption.

A number of local volunteer groups have undertaken efforts to improve the quality of water in Lake Carnegie and surrounding waterways. These efforts include litter removal, water sample testing, and educational programs.

== Gallery ==
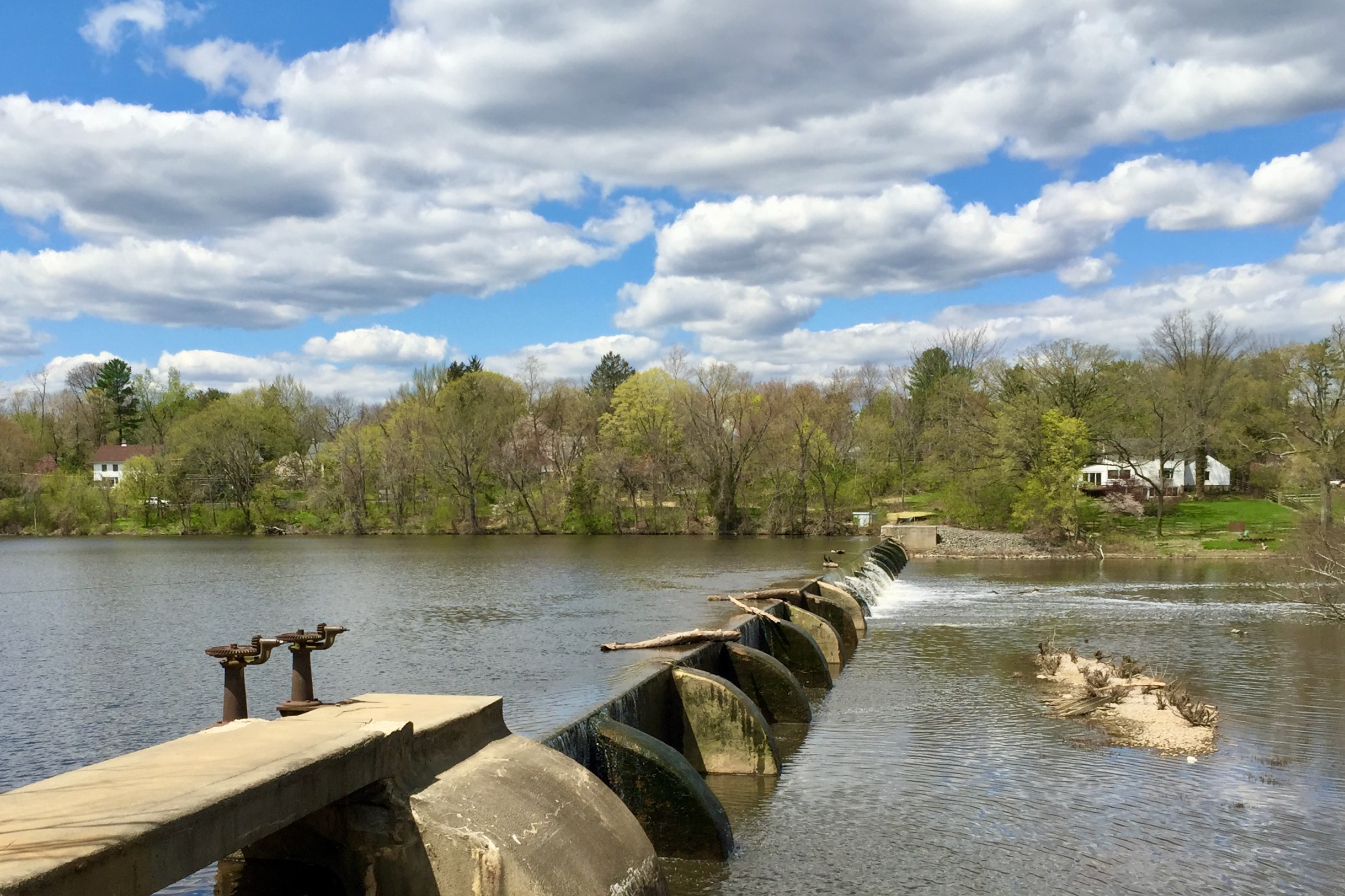
Dam forming Lake Carnegie

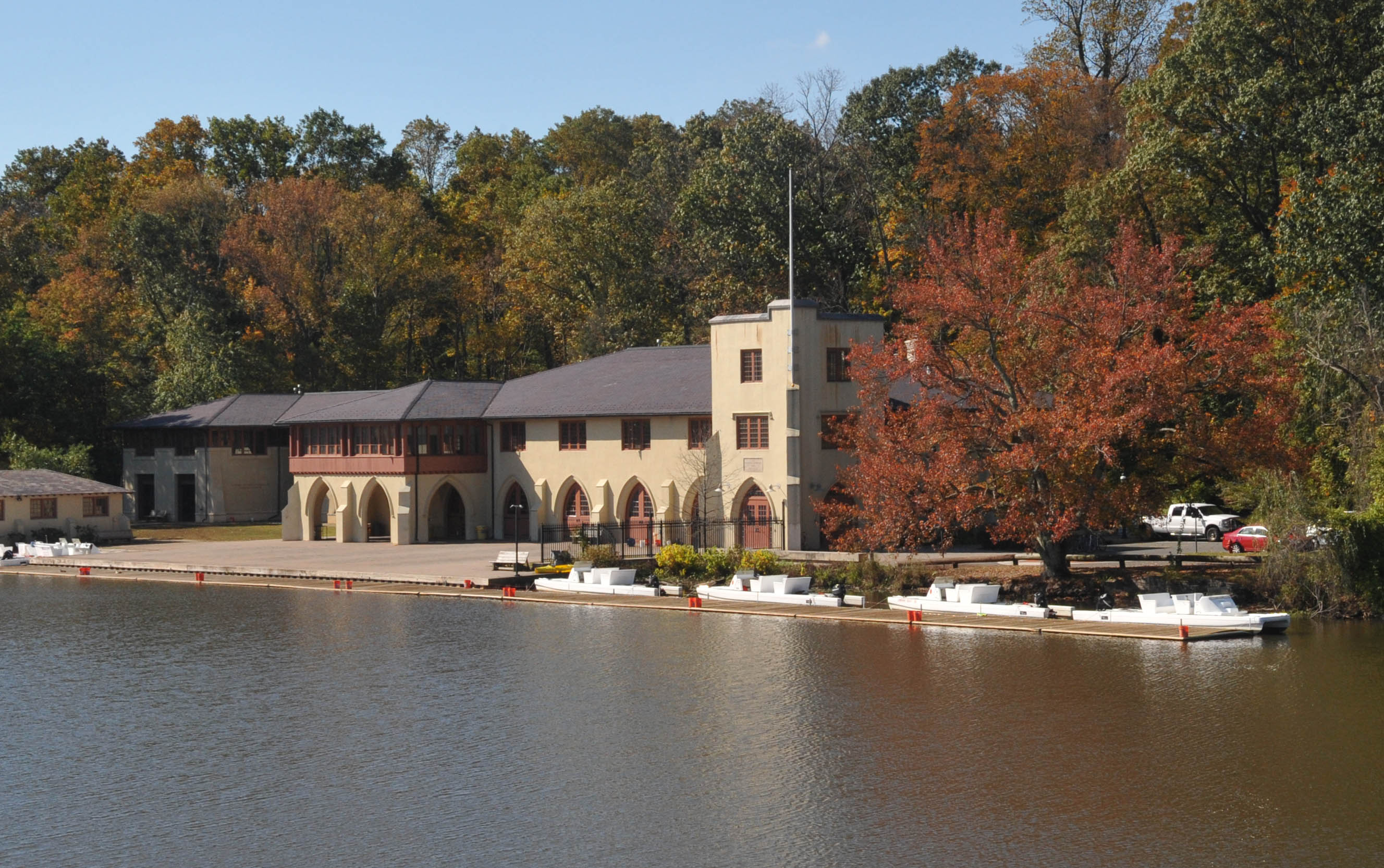
The boathouse, home to Princeton Rowing and the US Olympic rowing team

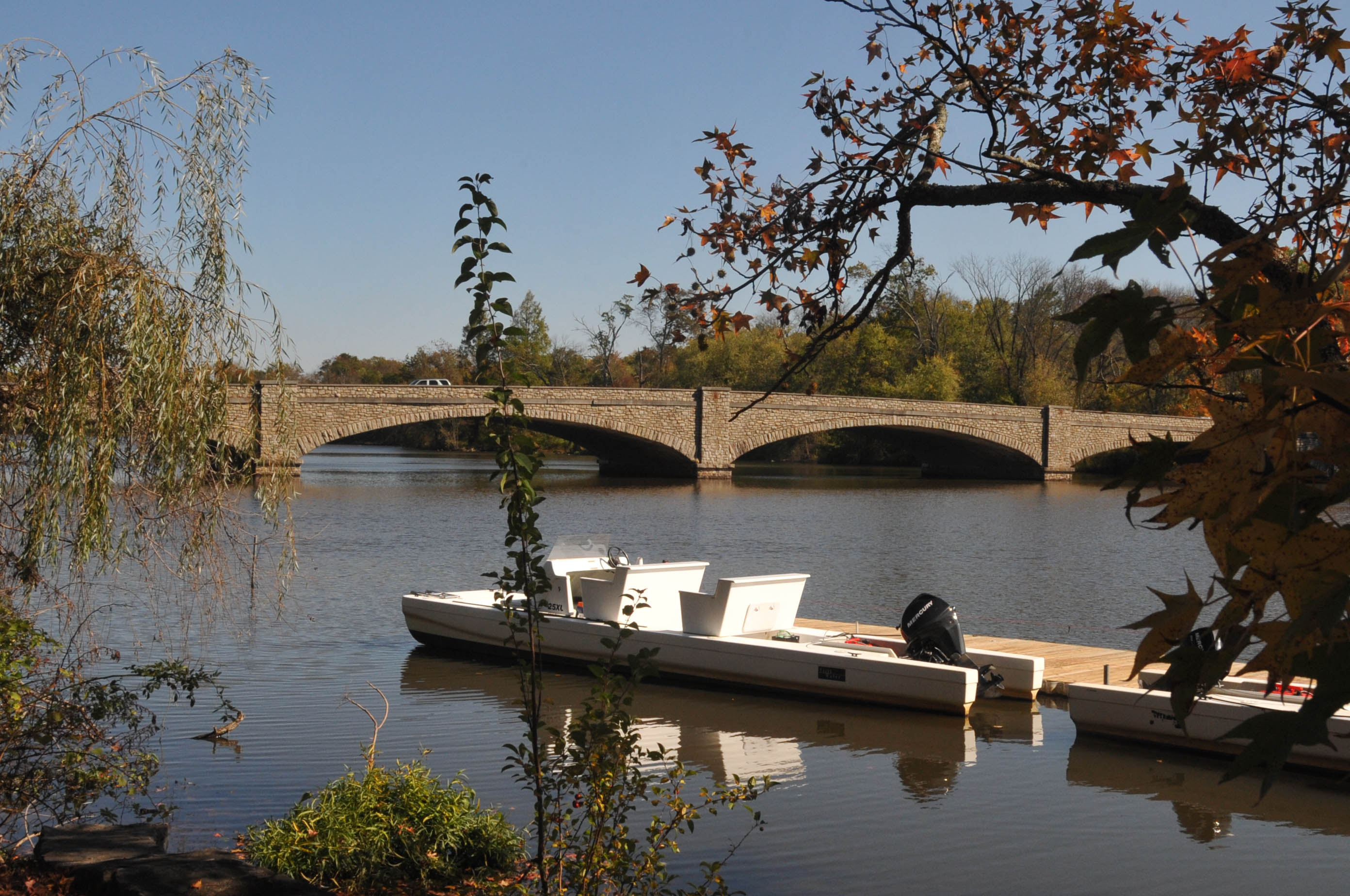
The Washington Road bridge

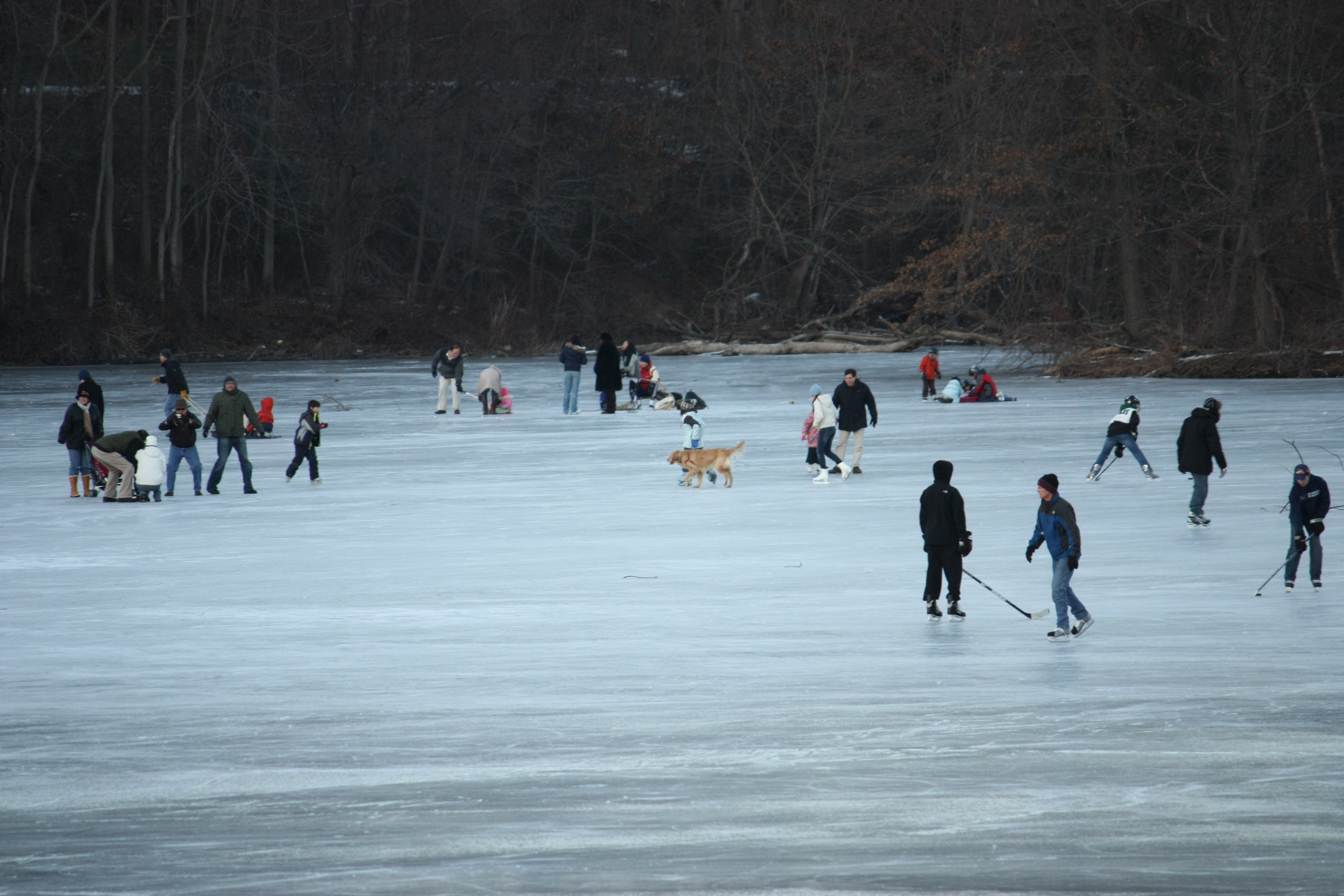
Ice skating on the lake
