= Price Glacier (Antarctica) =

Glacier in Antarctica

- Location within South Georgia Island
- Location: South Georgia
- Coordinates: 54°7′S 37°29′W
- Length: 3.5 nmi (6 km; 4 mi)
- Thickness: unknown
- Terminus: Cheapman Bay
- Status: unknown

Price Glacier is a glacier 3.5 miles (6 km) long, flowing southwest to Cheapman Bay on the south side of South Georgia. It was surveyed by the South Georgia Survey in the period 1951–57, and named for a member of the survey, Thomas Price, in 1955-56

== See also ==
- List of glaciers in the Antarctic
- Glaciology
