= Duck Pond Run =

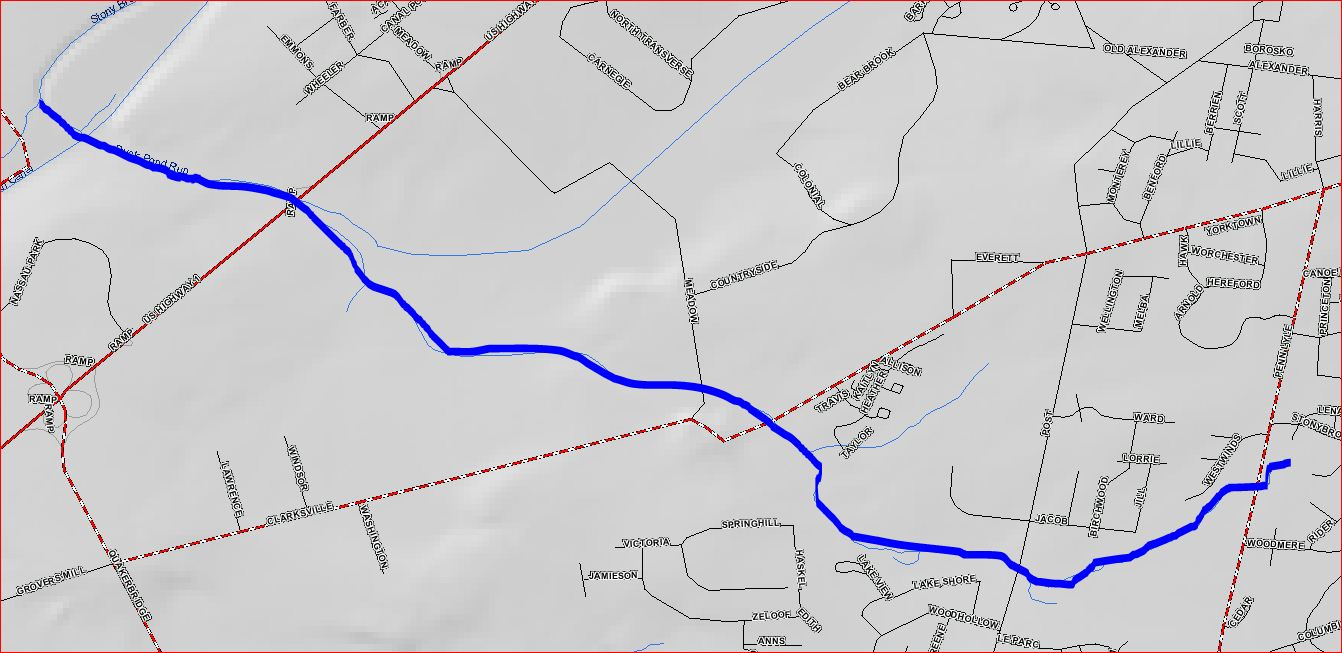
- Map of Duck Pond Run

Location
- Country: United States

Physical characteristics
- Source
  - coordinates: 40°17′40″N 74°37′21″W
- Mouth
  - coordinates: 40°18′33″N 74°40′39″W
  - elevation: 43 ft (13 m)

Basin features
- Progression: Stony Brook (Millstone River), Millstone River, Raritan River, Atlantic Ocean
- River system: Raritan River system

Duck Pond Run is a tributary of the Stony Brook in Mercer County, New Jersey in the United States.

== Course ==
Duck Pond Run starts at 40°17′40″N 74°37′21″W, within West Windsor. It flows west, crossing Penn Lyle Road and North Post Road before flowing through the Duck Pond Run park. It then crosses Clarksville Road and flows through the West Windsor PL Project. It crosses Route 1 before flowing through the Princeton Country Club. It then crosses under the Delaware and Raritan Canal and drains into the Stony Brook at 40°18′33″N 74°40′39″W.

== Sister tributaries ==
- Baldwins Creek
- Honey Branch
- Lewis Brook
- Peters Brook
- Stony Brook Branch
- Woodsville Brook

== See also ==
- List of rivers of New Jersey
