= Judge Peters =

Judge Peters may refer to:

- John A. Peters (1864–1953) (1864–1953), judge of the United States District Court for the District of Maine
- Nigel Peters (born 1952), circuit judge for England and Wales
- Richard Peters (judge) (1744–1828), judge of the United States District Court for the District of Pennsylvania

== See also ==
- Justice Peters (disambiguation)
