= Stony Brook (Millstone River tributary) =

Stony Brook Wopowog
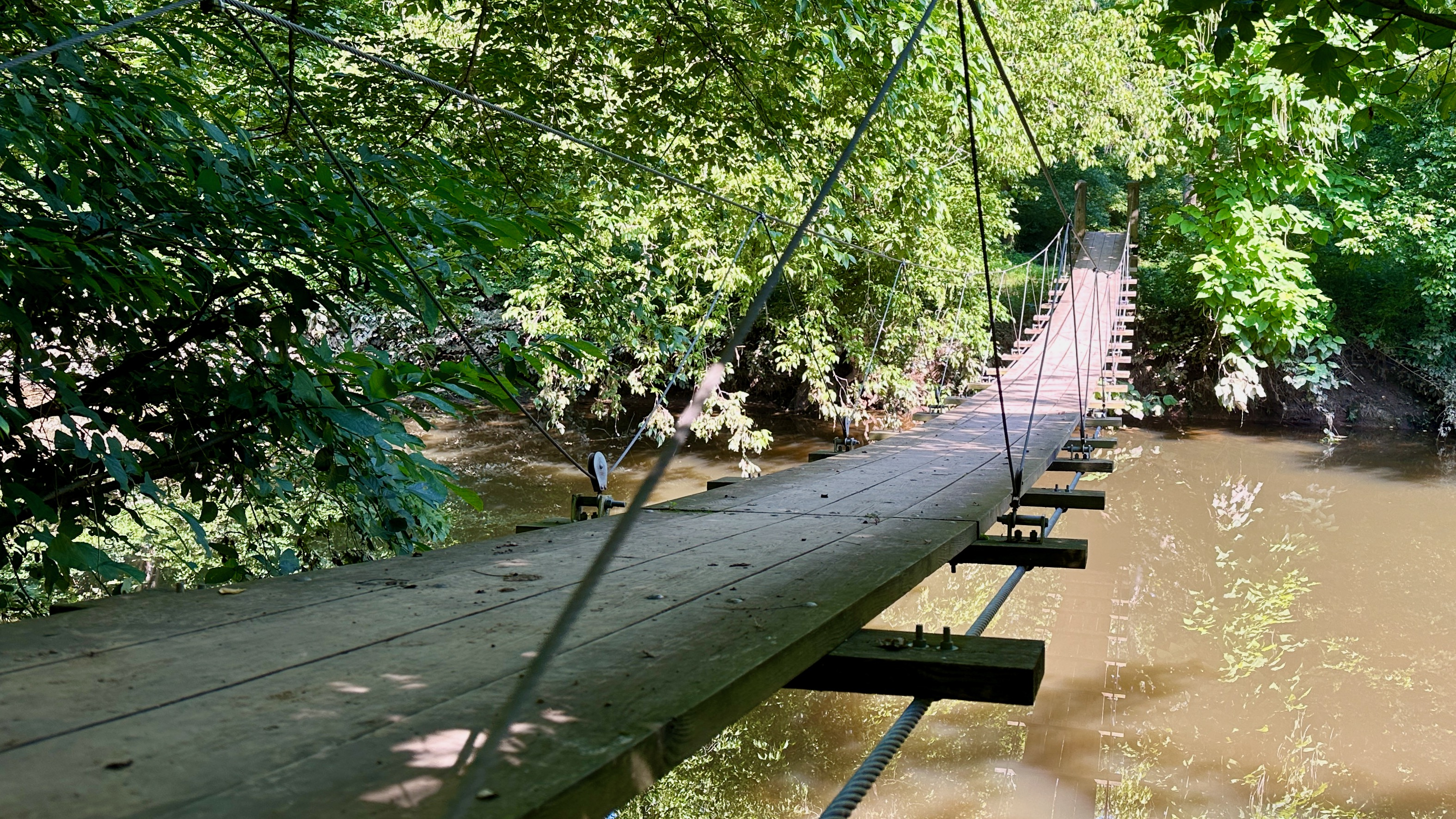
- Swinging Bridge over Stony Brook, Institute for Advanced Study

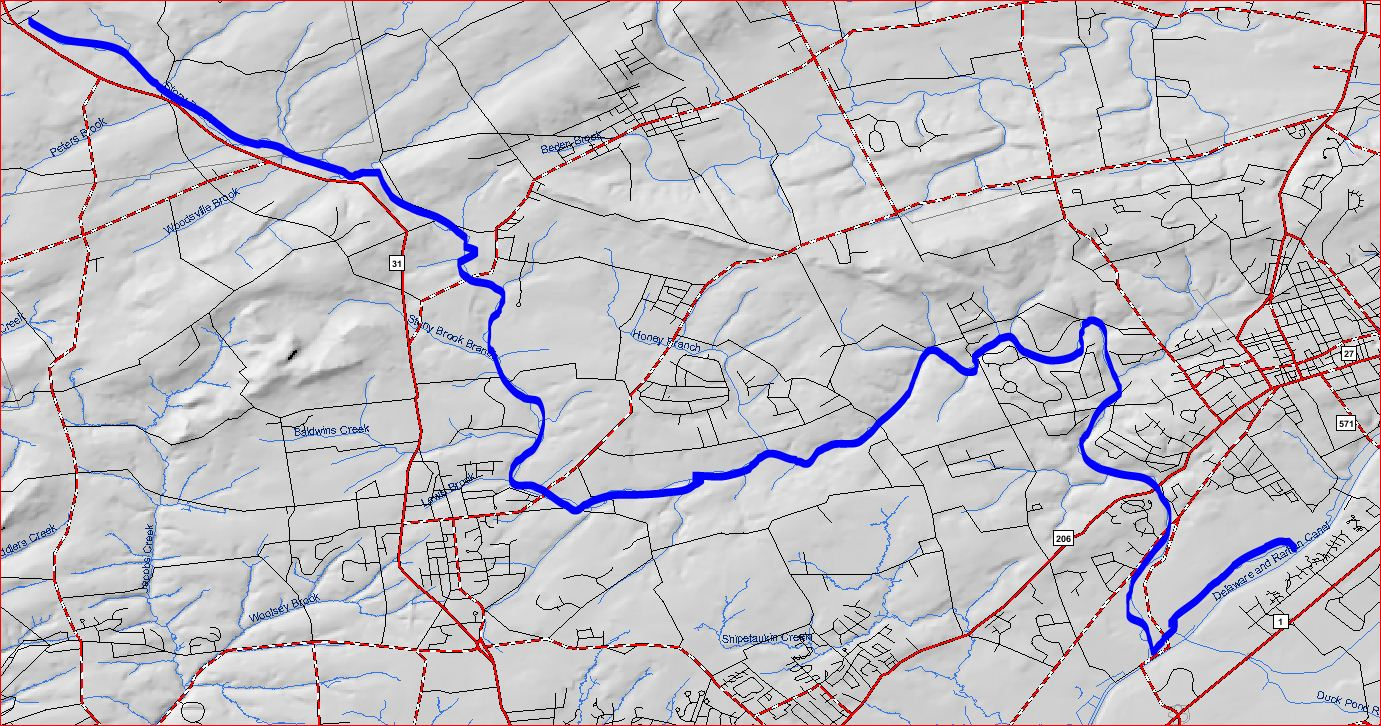
- Map of Stony Brook

Location
- Country: United States

Physical characteristics
- Source
  - coordinates: 40°24′22″N 74°51′26″W
- Mouth
  - coordinates: 40°20′3″N 74°39′9″W
  - elevation: 49 ft (15 m)

Basin features
- Progression: Millstone River, Raritan River, Atlantic Ocean
- Tributaries
  - left: Honey Branch
  - right: Baldwins Creek, Duck Pond Run, Lewis Brook, Peters Brook, Stony Brook Branch, Woodsville Brook

Stony Brook, also known as Stoney Brook, (Lenape: Wopowog) is a tributary of the Millstone River in Hunterdon and Mercer counties, New Jersey, in the United States.

== Course ==
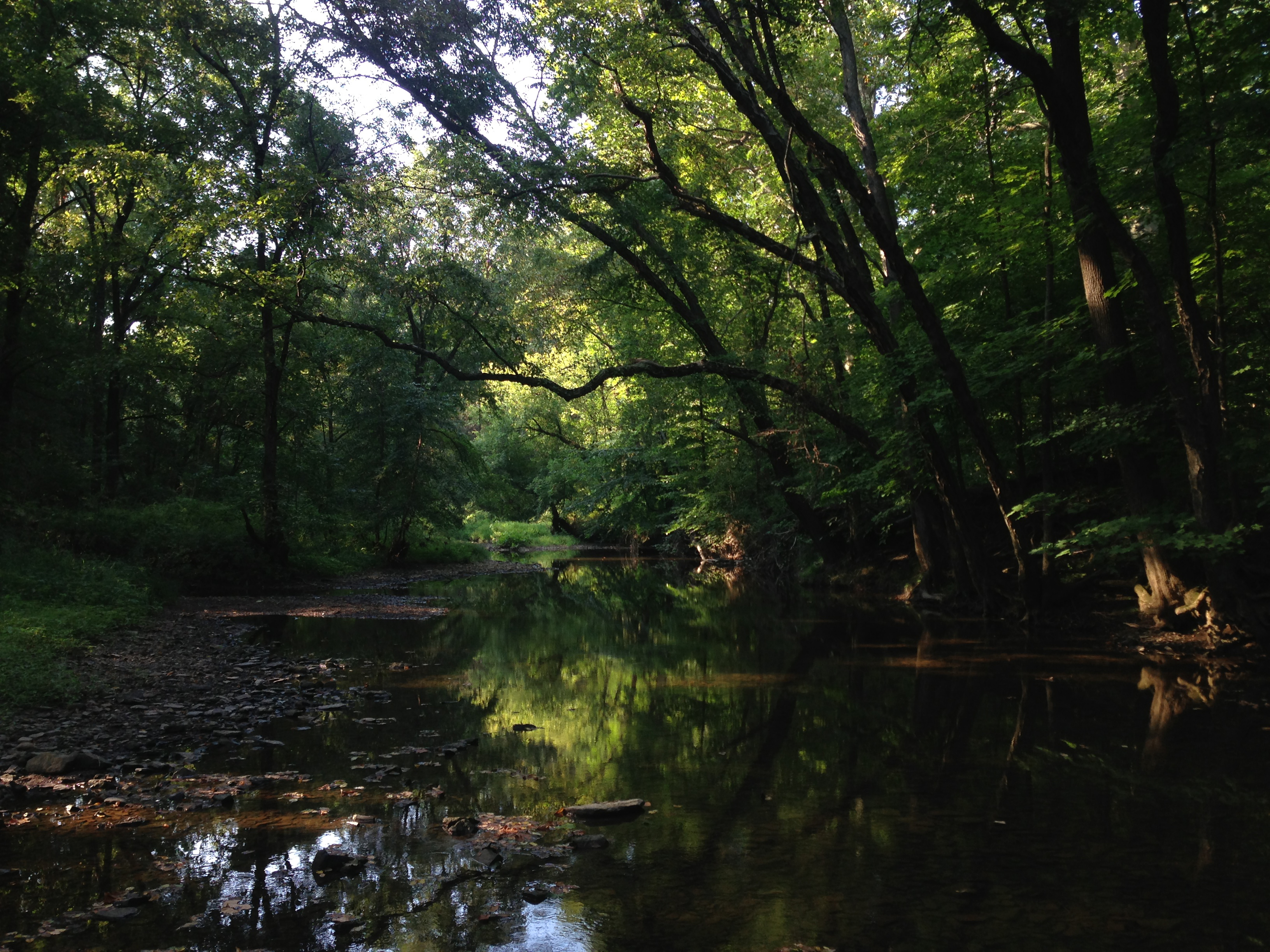
View up the Stony Brook from within the Stony Brook–Millstone Watershed Association's nature reserve in Hopewell Township

Stony Brook starts at 40°24′22″N 74°51′26″W, just south of Ringoes. It flows south through the Amwell Lake Wildlife Management Area. It flows southeast, flowing parallel to Route 31 while it receives Peters Brook and Woodsville Brook. It receives a tributary from Sourland Mountain, and crosses Pennington-Hopewell Road. It flows through the Hopewell Valley Country Club and the Stony Brook–Millstone Watershed Association's nature reserve, and then receives the Stony Brook Branch. From there, it flows between Bristol-Myers Squibb and the Baldwin State Wildlife Management Area, receiving Baldwins Creek. It then flows through Kunkel Park and receives Lewis Brook. It then turns east, flowing through Old Mill Road County Park and Rosedale Park, where it receives Honey Branch. It then flows through a mountainous area with several large meanders, and turns south near Coventry Farm Park.

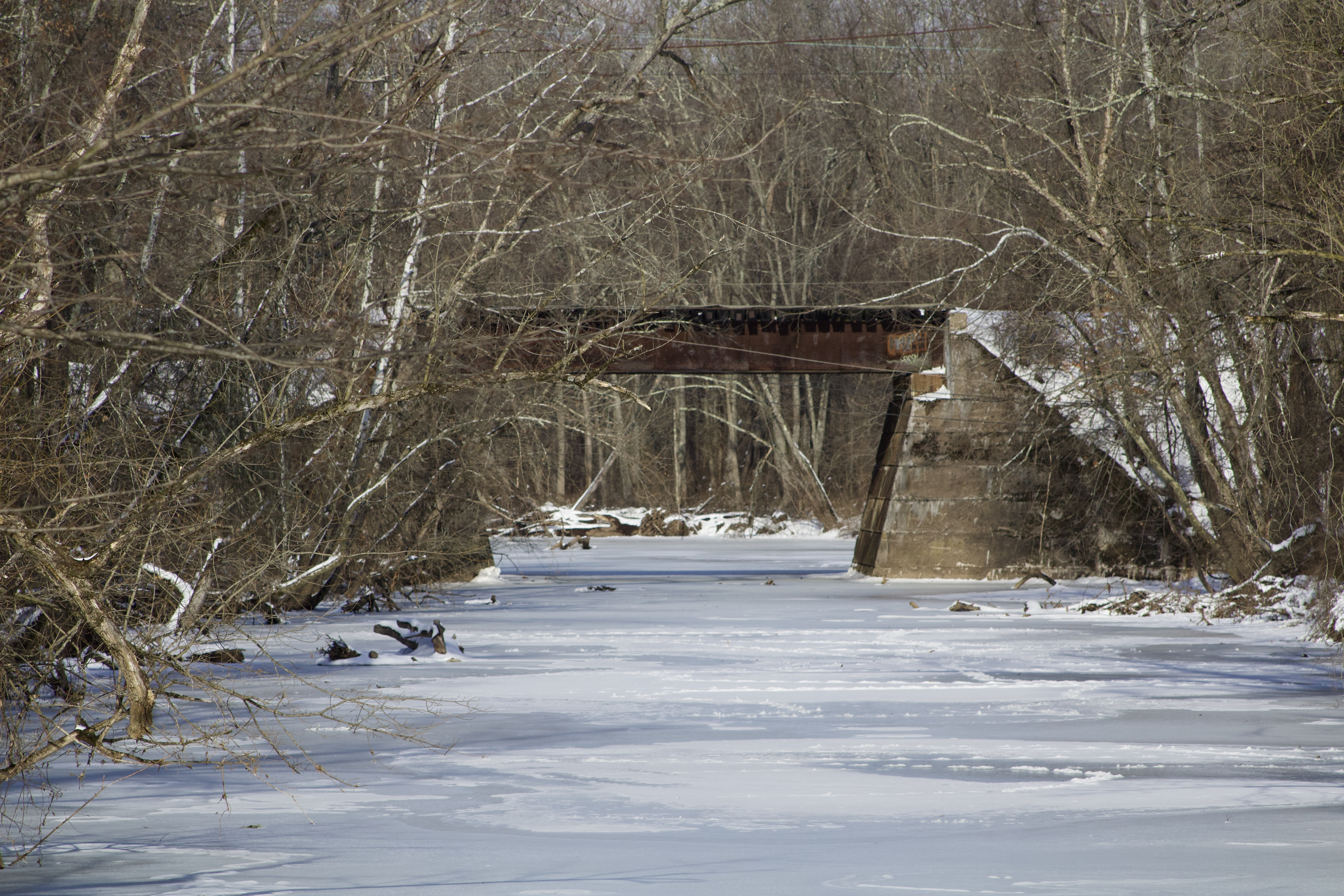
View of a bridge that connects the train route for the Dinky, the Stony Brook that flows underneath being frozen in wintertime

It flows through Princeton Open Space Acquisition and then crosses Route 206. It then flows parallel to Quaker Road (CR-533) until it reaches the Delaware and Raritan Canal, where it turns northeast. It then receives Duck Pond Run from under the canal, crosses Alexander Street, and drains into Lake Carnegie on the Millstone River at 40°20′3″N 74°39′9″W, in the southeastern portion of Princeton.

== Tributaries ==
- Baldwins Creek
- Duck Pond Run
- Honey Branch
- Lewis Brook
- Peters Brook
- Stony Brook Branch
- Woodsville Brook

== Sister tributaries ==
- Beden Brook
- Bear Brook
- Cranbury Brook
- Devils Brook
  - Shallow Brook
- Harrys Brook
- Heathcote Brook
- Indian Run Brook
- Little Bear Brook
- Millstone Brook
- Peace Brook
- Rocky Brook
- Royce Brook
- Simonson Brook
- Six Mile Run
- Ten Mile Run
- Van Horn Brook

== See also ==
- List of rivers of New Jersey
