= John Bremner =

American explorer (1833–1887)

John Bremner (1833–1887) was a prospector and early explorer of Alaska.

== Early life ==
John Bremner was born in Rhynie, Aberdeenshire, Scotland, and emigrated to Iowa. At some point he abandoned his farm and family and probably worked as a sailor.

== Life among the Indians in Alaska ==
In 1884, he was first recorded as living among on the Copper River (Alaska), the only white man living in an area inhabited at the time by the Copper Indians, or Yellowknives. In the summers he prospected for gold. In 1884–85 he wrote a diary about his time living through the winter on the Copper River in a cabin with an Indian wife amongst the Copper River Indians (referred to him as "Ma Nuska") which was transcribed into the book Shores and Slopes of Alaska, pp. 200–21.

== Allen expedition ==
In early 1885 John Bremner joined the expedition of Lt. Henry Tureman Allen, a West Point graduate, traveling 1,500 miles (2,400 km) with Lt. Allen, Pvt. Frederick W. Fickett, Sgt. Cody Robertson, and fellow prospector Peder Johnson, through previously unexplored territory along the Copper, Tanana, and Koyukuk Rivers. On March 29, 1885, the party left Taral to ascend the previously unexplored Copper River. After a side trip up the Chitina River to the head of that river, they continued up the Copper to the Slana River. They traveled to the source of the Slana and then downstream on the Tetlin and Tanana rivers to the Yukon. In the Fall of 1886 Johnson and Bremner decided to stay in the town of Nuklukyet on the Yukon (today known as Old Station, 17 miles (27 km) below the town of Tanana) while the others continued. Lt. Allen and Pvt. Fickett portaged to the Kanuti and Koyukuk rivers upstream, traveled downstream to the Yukon, portaged to the Unalakleet and from there went downstream to St. Michael. Their journey was "subsequently praised as one of the greater explorations in the history of North America." Allen Glacier and Mt. Allen, near the head of the Tanana, are named for the party's leader.

== Work as prospector and end of life ==
John Bremner and Peder Johnson purchased a prospecting outfit from the men who ran the trading post at Nuklukyet and stayed in the Central Yukon River area during the winter of 1886–87. In the spring of 1887 they prospected on the Koyukuk River and then returned to Nuklukyet. While boating and prospecting on a tributary of the Yukon River called John's River (later named for him) and the Dolby River, he was killed by Indians who stole his rifle and boat. In the summer of 1888, a posse of prospectors took a steamer up the Koyukuk River and Dolby River where a village was discovered. The inhabitants were persuaded to give up two native Indians, one of whom was hanged from a tree.

== Geographical places named for John Bremner ==
The Bremner River, part of the Wrangell–St. Elias National Park and Preserve and Wrangell – Saint Elias Wilderness, flows into the Copper River 55 miles (89 km) northwest of Katalla, and the Chugach Mountains. The North Fork of the Bremner has its headwaters at the Bremner Glacier, which is 8 miles (13 km) long. From the junction of the Middle and the North forks of the Bremner the river flows through mountain wilderness 40 miles (64 km) southwest to the Copper. The town of Bremner Alaska, on the Copper River, a small settlement with an airstrip, near Chitina is the site of the Bremner Historic Mining District which is on the National Register of Historic Places listings in Copper River Census Area, Alaska. The John River is formed from the confluence of the Contact and Inukpasugruk Creeks, and flows 125 miles (201 km) south from Anaktuvuk Pass to Koyukuk River (which flows into the Yukon River), 1 mile northeast of Bettles, Kanuti Flats 66°55' N, 151°39' W.
