= Stony Brook Branch =

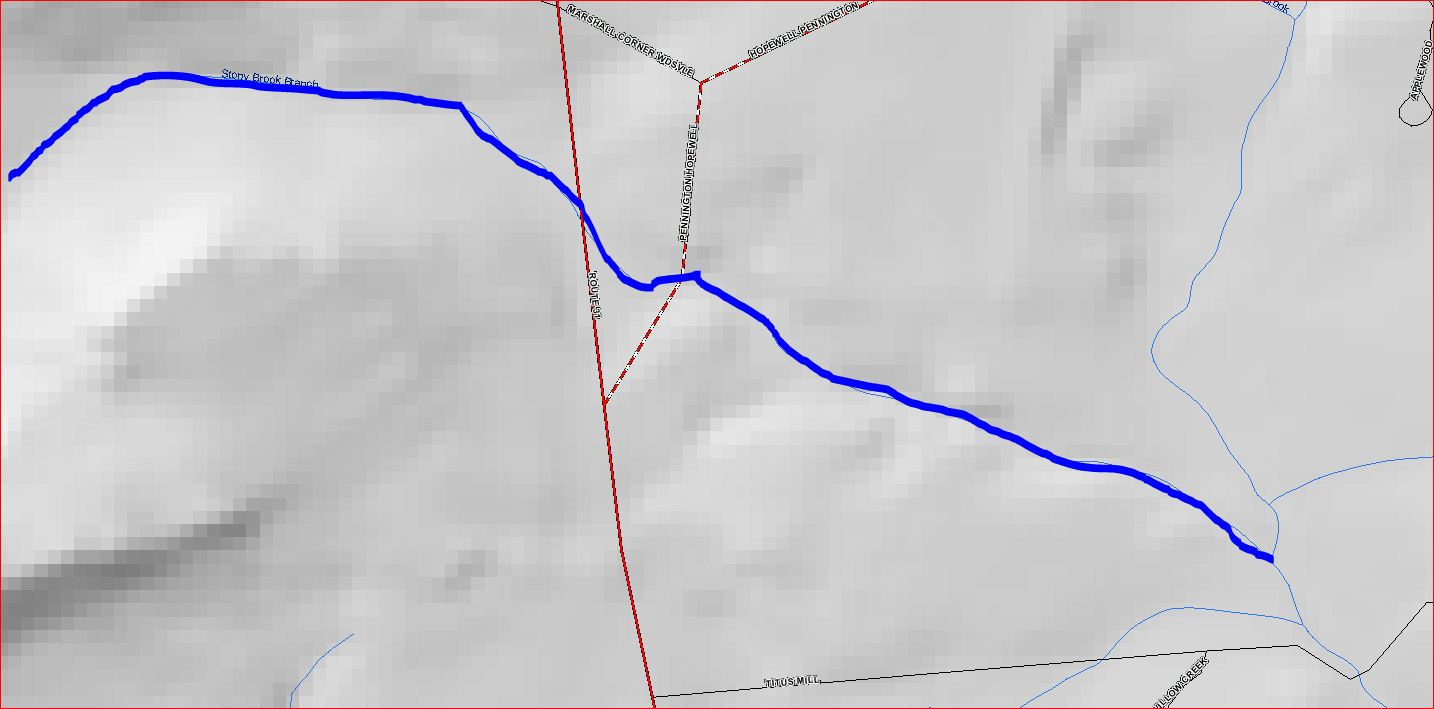
- Map of Stony Brook Branch

Location
- Country: United States

Physical characteristics
- Source
  - coordinates: 40°21′31″N 74°48′38″W
- Mouth
  - coordinates: 40°21′6″N 74°47′2″W
  - elevation: 151 ft (46 m)

Basin features
- Progression: Stony Brook (Millstone River), Millstone River, Raritan River, Atlantic Ocean
- River system: Raritan River system

Stony Brook Branch is a tributary of the Stony Brook in Mercer County, New Jersey in the United States.

== Course ==
The Stony Brook Branch starts at 40°21′31″N 74°48′38″W, in Sourland Mountain near Route 31 (Pennington Road). It flows east, crossing Route 31 and Pennington Hopewell Road before draining into the Stony Brook at 40°21′6″N 74°47′2″W.

== Sister tributaries ==
- Baldwins Creek
- Duck Pond Run
- Honey Branch
- Lewis Brook
- Peters Brook
- Woodsville Brook

== See also ==
- List of rivers of New Jersey
