= Jeffery Glacier =

Glacier in the United States

- Location within Alaska
- Interactive map of Jeffery Glacier
- Type: Valley glacier
- Location: Denali Borough, Alaska, U.S.
- Coordinates: 63°08′16″N 151°04′33″W

Jeffery Glacier is a glacier in Denali National Park and Preserve in the U.S. state of Alaska. The glacier begins in the Alaska Range on the north side of Denali directly below the Wickersham Wall, heading northeast to join Peters Glacier after the latter's Tluna Icefall.

== See also ==
- List of glaciers
