= Baldwins Creek =

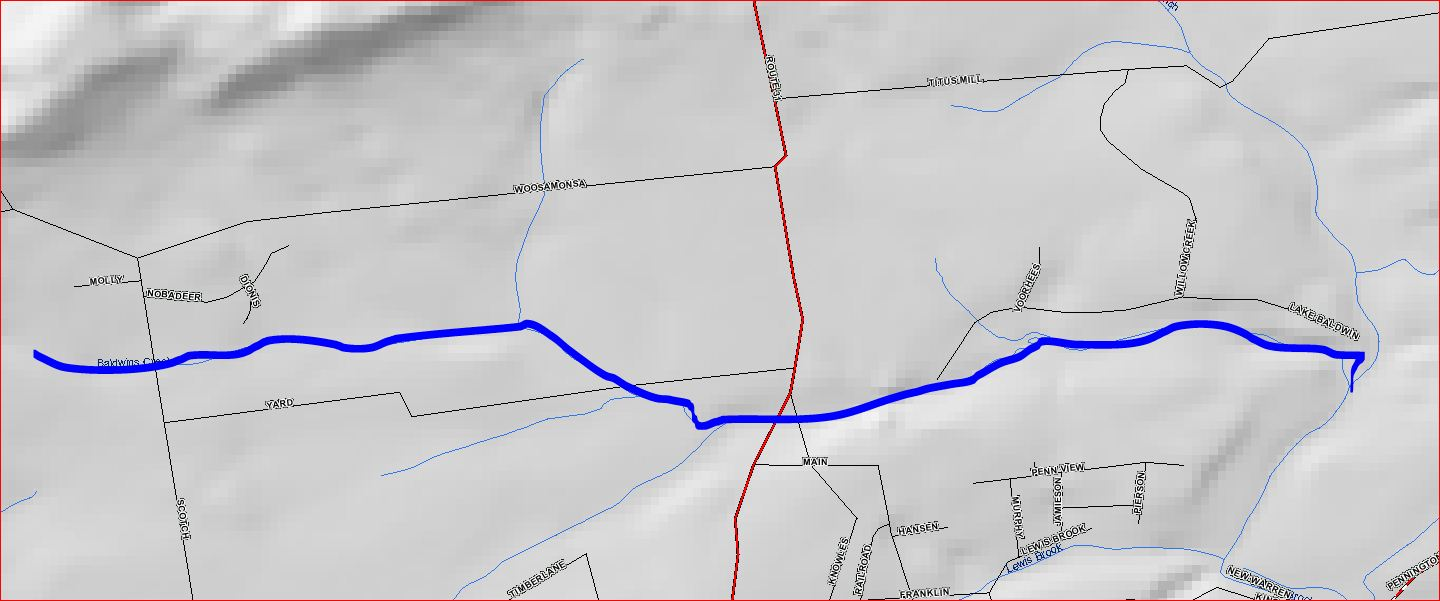
- Map of Baldwins Creek

Location
- Country: United States

Physical characteristics
- Source
  - location: 40°20′26″N 74°49′17″W
- Mouth
  - location: 40°20′21″N 74°46′41″W
  - elevation: 138 ft (42 m)

Basin features
- Progression: Stony Brook (Millstone River), Millstone River, Raritan River, Atlantic Ocean
- River system: Raritan River system

Baldwins Creek is a tributary of the Stony Brook in Mercer County, New Jersey in the United States.

== Course ==
Baldwins Creek starts at 40°20′26″N 74°49′17″W, near Baldwin State Park. It flows east, flowing through Baldwin State Park and crossing Route 31 (Pennington Road). It flows through the Baldwin State Wildlife Management Area and joins Stony Brook at 40°20′21″N 74°46′41″W.

== Sister tributaries ==
- Duck Pond Run
- Honey Branch
- Lewis Brook
- Peters Brook
- Stony Brook Branch
- Woodsville Brook

== See also ==
- List of rivers of New Jersey
