= Peters Creek (Twelvemile Creek tributary) =

Stream in the American state of Missouri

Coordinates: 37.406997°N 90.319282°W

Peters Creek is a stream in Madison County in the U.S. state of Missouri. It is a tributary of Twelvemile Creek.

The identity of namesake Peters is unknown.

== See also ==
- List of rivers of Missouri
