= Woodsville Brook =

Stony Brook tributary in New Jersey, U.S.

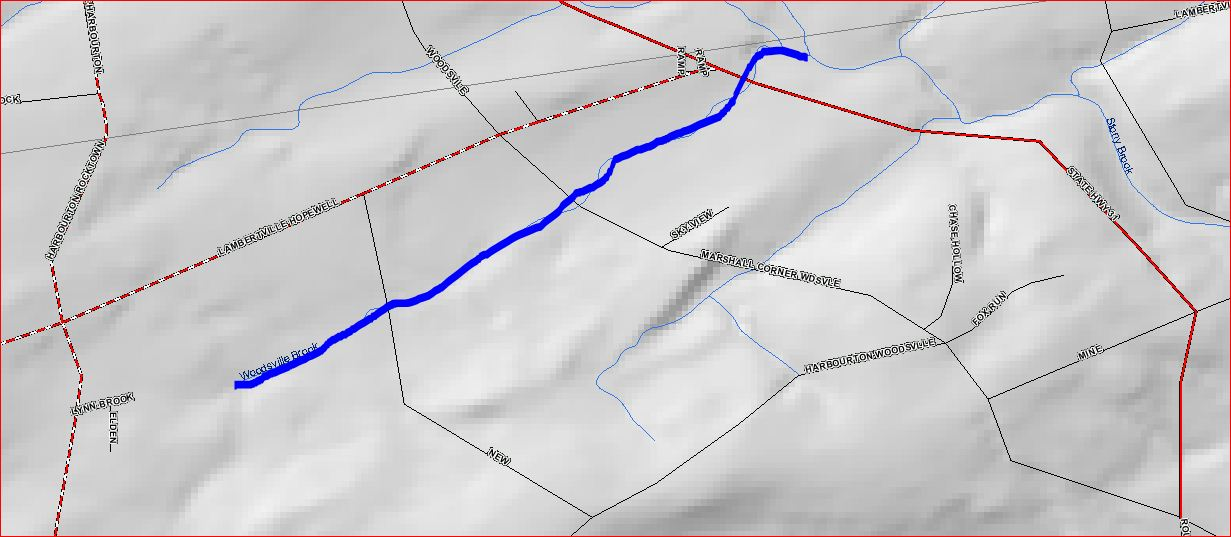
- Map of Woodsville Brook

Location
- Country: United States

Physical characteristics
- Source
  - coordinates: 40°22′8″N 74°50′27″W
- Mouth
  - coordinates: 40°23′2″N 74°48′55″W
  - elevation: 197 ft (60 m)

Basin features
- Progression: Stony Brook (Millstone River), Millstone River, Raritan River, Atlantic Ocean
- River system: Raritan River system

Woodsville Brook is a tributary of the Stony Brook in Mercer County, New Jersey in the United States.

== Course ==
Woodsville Brook starts at 40°22′8″N 74°50′27″W. It flows northeast, crossing New Road and Marshalls Corner Woodsville Road. It then crosses Route 31 (Pennington Road) and Route 518 (Lambertville Hopewell Road) near to their intersection before joining the Stony Brook at 40°23′2″N 74°48′55″W.

== Sister tributaries ==
- Baldwins Creek
- Duck Pond Run
- Honey Branch
- Lewis Brook
- Peters Brook
- Stony Brook Branch

== See also ==
- List of rivers of New Jersey
