= Peter Creek (Missouri) =

Stream in Bates County, Missouri, U.S.

Peter Creek is a stream in Bates County in the U.S. state of Missouri. It is a tributary of the South Grand River.

The stream headwaters arise northwest of Ballard and the stream flows northeast passing east of Aaron to its confluence with a meander of the old South Grand channel at the northern boundary of Bates County.

The headwaters are at 38°22′20″N 94°10′36″W and the confluence is at 38°26′47″N 94°07′36″W.

Peter Creek bears the name of Peter Ewing, a pioneer citizen.

== See also ==
- List of rivers of Missouri
