= Justice Peters =

Justice Peters may refer to:

- Ellen Ash Peters (1930–2024), associate justice of the Connecticut Supreme Court
- Emil C. Peters (1877–1961), associate justice of the Supreme Court of Hawaii
- John A. Peters (1822–1904), chief justice of the Maine Supreme Judicial Court
- John Thompson Peters (1764–1834), associate justice of the Connecticut Supreme Court
- Raymond E. Peters (1903–1973), associate justice of the Supreme Court of California
- Thomas Minott Peters (1810–1888), associate justice and chief justice of the Alabama Supreme Court

== See also ==
- Judge Peters (disambiguation)
