= Peters Fashions =

Peters Fashions, also known as Peters of Huddersfield, is a family-run department store in the market town of Huddersfield, West Yorkshire, England.

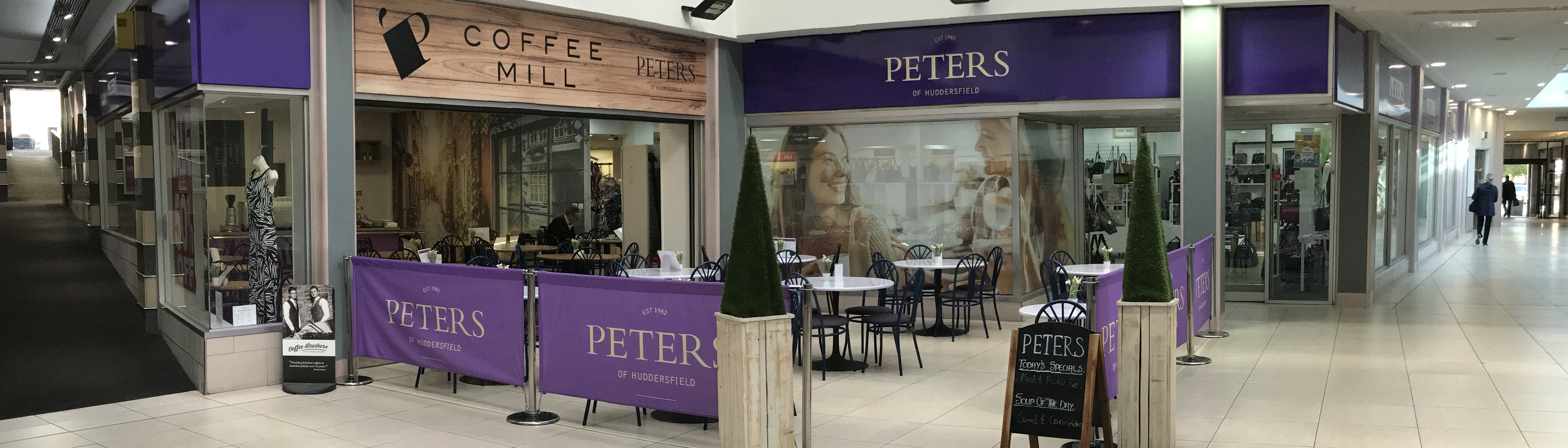
Peters of Huddersfield store front in 2017

The business has its origins in the department store Kayes, founded in 1863. Ernest Whittle was joint managing director of Kayes until his death in 1976, when his sons Alan and Peter took over. In April 1982, Kayes, citing the recession and issues with town centre parking, announced their King Street store would close in July with a loss of 100 jobs. Peter Whittle who had worked at Kayes since 1948 used his share of the business to launch a store bearing his name; Peters.

The store ran successfully for many years and remained a family business. Peter retired from the day-to-day running of the company and became company Chairman in 1991. His son David and daughter-in-law Caroline took over the running of the company upon his retirement. In 2001 Wolverhampton-based James Beattie opened a department store in the Kingsgate Centre and this, coupled with losses from the cookshop and cashflow difficulties relating to difficult market conditions saw Peters placed in the hands of administrators, Kroll, in February 2006 after revealing losses of £312,000 on a gross turnover of £3 million.

The Whittle family left the business and the administrators decided that the business was able to be saved and ran it as a going concern. Later in 2006 the Whittles with backing from one of their concession partners, Stephen Buck, were able to bring the store out of administration and resuming trading.

The BBC made a television documentary series of three programmes, entitled 'The Department Store'. Produced by Richard Macer, it was about independent department stores and how they are surviving in the modern world in the face of stiff competition from chain stores. The second programme in the series, on Peters, was shown on BBC Four on 24 November 2008 and followed David and Caroline Whittle for six months as they attempted to turn around the stores fortunes.

In September 2010, the Whittle family were able to regain control of the store, although this move was not widely broadcast at the time given the store's recent history and the couple's regret at having had to make people redundant in the past. The next generation of the family, Jonathan and Joseph Whittle have already been working for the firm and both are studying for business qualifications.

The company has now re-launched and undergone a full re-brand including website and social media overhauls and is trading in fashion and accessories alongside operating a coffee shop.
