= Peters Glacier (South Georgia) =

Glacier in the Arctic

- Location within South Georgia Island
- Location: South Georgia
- Coordinates: 54°8′S 37°33′W
- Thickness: unknown
- Terminus: Cheapman Bay
- Status: unknown

Peters Glacier (54°8′S 37°33′W) is a glacier flowing southward into the west side of Cheapman Bay, South Georgia. Named by United Kingdom Antarctic Place-Names Committee (UK-APC) for Nikolaus Peters, a leading German authority on whales and whaling and Director of Reichsstelle für Walforschung, Hamburg, 1937–1940.

== See also ==
- List of glaciers in the Antarctic
- Glaciology
