= National Homeopathic Hospital =

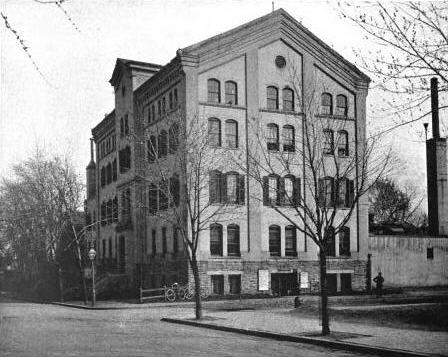
- The building at Kirby and N Streets, Northwest (demolished)

Geography
- Location: Washington, D.C., U.S.

Organisation
- Care system: Homeopathic

History
- Opened: 1881

Links
- Lists: Hospitals in U.S.

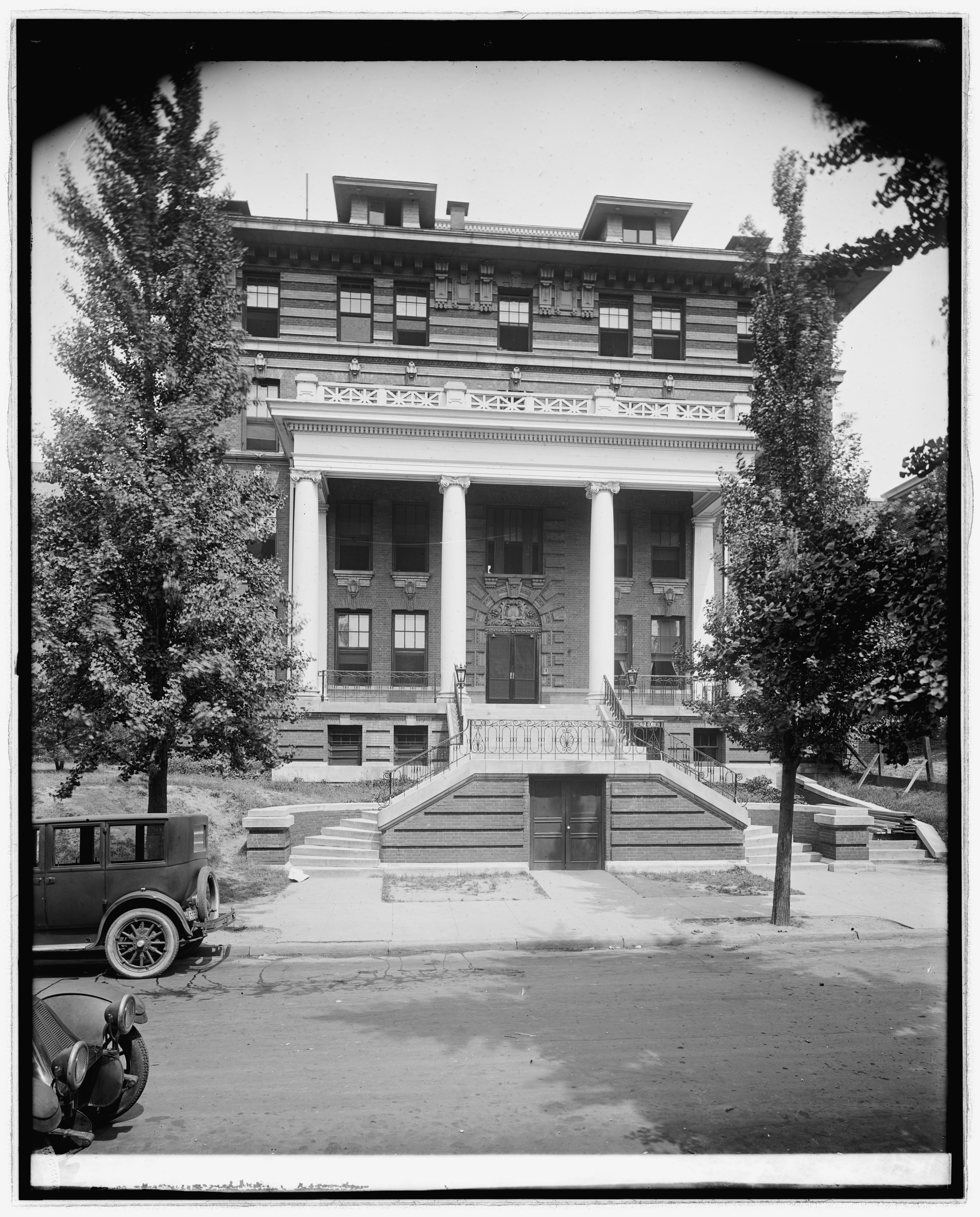
Front view (between 1910 and 1926)

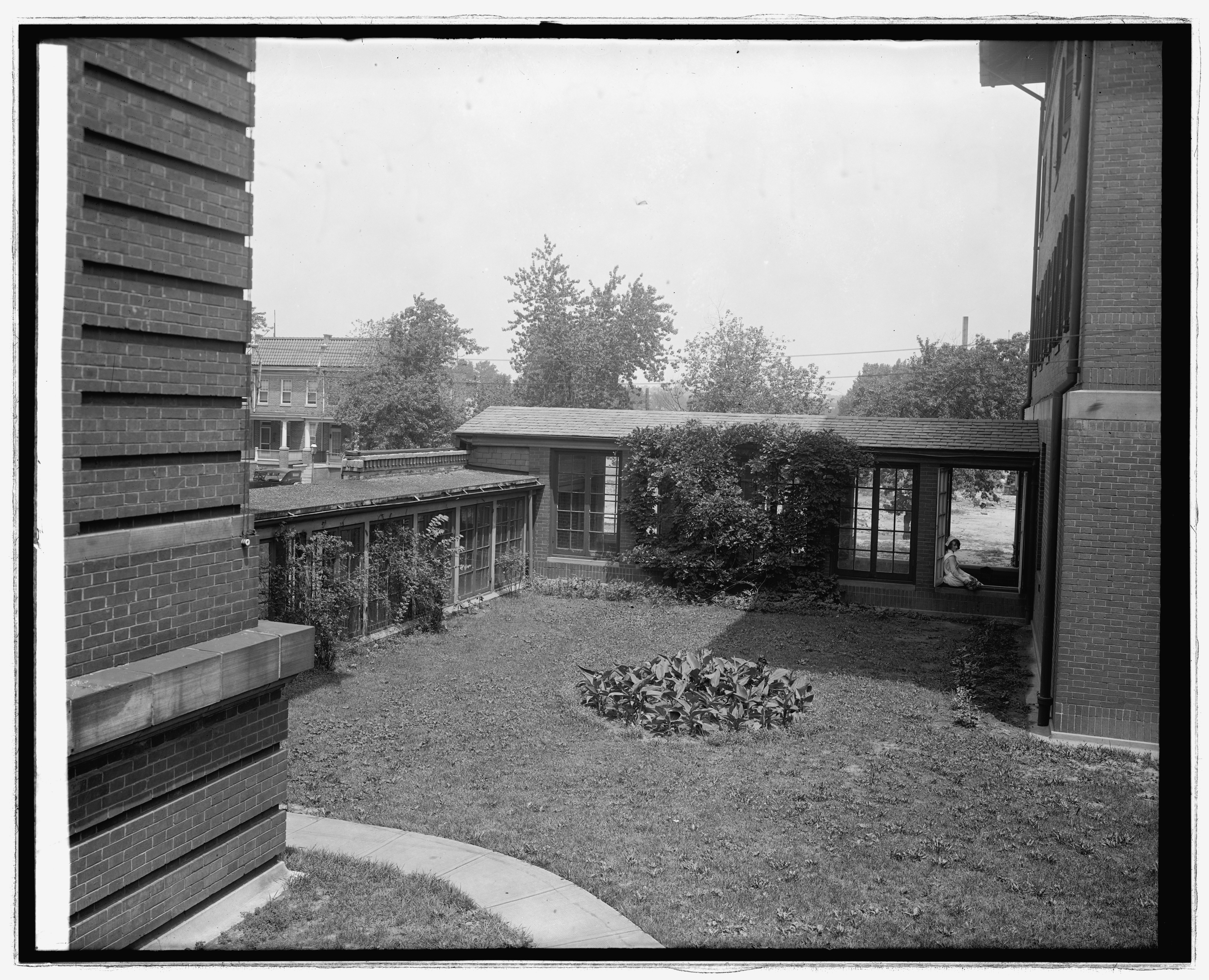
Exterior view

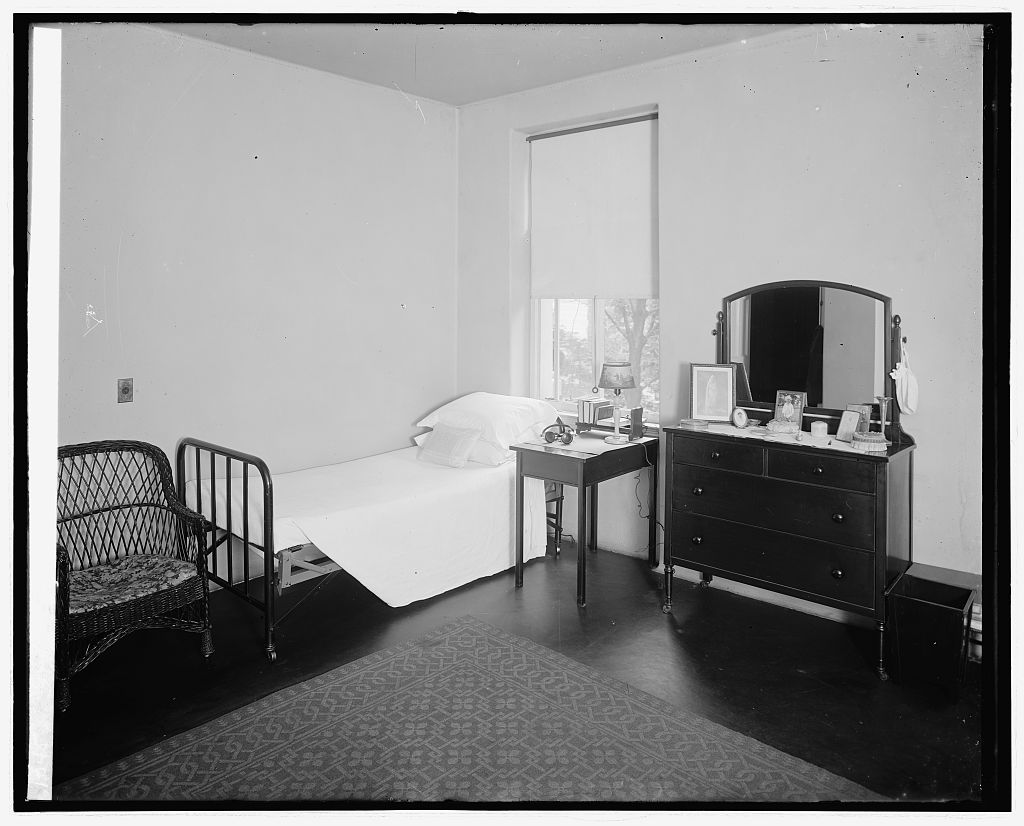
Patient room

National Homeopathic Hospital is a defunct American hospital. Located in Washington, D.C., it was established in 1881, and became Hahnemann Hospital in 1956.

== History ==
This hospital was incorporated in June, 1881, but for several years had no buildings. An effort was made to unite with the Garfield Memorial Hospital, chartered a few months later, with the view of establishing "a grand unsectarian hospital where both systems of medicine could be fairly and openly tried". Indeed, paragraph 7 of section 17 in the plans of organization of Garfield Memorial Hospital read as follows: "One ward in the hospital shall be appropriated to the homeopathic treatment for such patients as desire it, and the directors shall provide for that purpose."

According to Dr. Samuel Clagett Busey, the adoption of this clause against the protest and over the votes of the medical members present, aroused the opposition and open hostility of many of its most conspicuous supporters among the profession at large and threatened for a time not only the success of the enterprise, but, what was even worse, to effect its transfer to the homeopathists." The objectionable paragraph was eliminated in May 1883, and in 1884, the board of directors of Garfield Memorial Hospital finally declined to grant to the homeopaths an equal representation on their board. As duplication of agencies involved additional cost in the way of overhead charges, it was unfortunate that the proposed union with Garfield Memorial Hospital was not accomplished.

The friends of the National Homeopathic Hospital, having received in the meantime both money and pledges from private sources, appealed to United States Congress in 1884 for recognition of a homeopathic hospital among the charities in the District of Columbia and secured an appropriation of US$15,000 for the purchase or erection of a building.

The first location of the hospital, in January 1884, was in rented quarters on F Street between Eleventh and Twelfth Streets. In October 1884, the hospital was removed to 520 Third Street Northwest, and in January, 1886, the hospital was removed to the corner of Second and N Streets Northwest, erected originally for a brewery and subsequently used as a public school.

In November 1888, A. S. Pratt, President Board of Trustees, made a statement to Congress with details of the receipts and expenditures and a report of the operations of the National Homeopathic Hospital Association for the fiscal year ending June 30, 1888. Further, the board of trustees of the association instructed him to provide an estimate of the amount necessary to maintain the hospital for the fiscal year ending June 30, 1890. The amount of Congressional aid required amounted to US$10,000, in addition to what may be received from the Ladies' Aid Society and friends of the hospital and from pay patients. The income of the association at that point had been entirely inadequate to enable it to meet the expense of support of many desiring homeopathic treatment free of charge — denied admittance not alone for lack of funds to support them but for want of room to accommodate them. Free patients were at all times admitted to the utmost limit of the resources of the hospital.

The general principles intended to be followed in the proposed improvements and additions were: to create a basement story by excavating under the present building; to enlarge the space for the male division and utilize the west side, now occupied for reception, committee, dining-rooms, etc., for male ward.; to create wards for children and for a maternity ward; and to use the northeast ward for the needs of the service, and generally to plan all the improvements necessary to bring the present hospital building to the standard of a model institution.

The hospital was re-incorporated July 13, 1901.

In 1905, a handsome addition, largely used for private patients and dispensary purposes, was erected. By 1914, the Government contributed for building purposes to this institution the sum of US$126,168. The hospital had a capacity for 37 ward patients and 36 pay patients. The District paid at the rate of US$1.10 a day for charity patients, from an annual appropriation of US$8,000.

In 1956, the hospital became Hahnemann Hospital, and was located at 135 New York Avenue Northwest.

== Certificate of incorporation ==
The National Homoeopathic Hospital Association of Washington, D.C

The certification of incorporation gave the name of this Society as the National Homeopathic Hospital Association of the District of Columbia. It stated that the organization shall continue for the period of fifty years. The business and object of the Society would be:

... to continue the beneficial work heretofore inaugurated and carried on by the Society incorporated by certificate dated June 10, 1881, under the name of the National Homeopathic Hospital Association of Washington, District of Columbia, and to this end to maintain a Homeopathic Hospital in the District of Columbia, in which the medical staff shall be composed of Homeopathic physicians only, but in which patients may be treated by any reputable physician of any recognized school of medicine, under regulations to be provided by the Board of Trustees; in which proper care and treatment may be given to lying-in women who may wish to be under homeopathic treatment; to which persons temporarily residing in the city may resort in case of sickness; to which accident cases, or persons suddenly taken sick in the street may be carried for temporary treatment; in which nurses may be instructed and clinical instruction given to students of medicine; in connection with which there may be a dispensary for the treatment of the poor homeopathically and to do such other things as may be legitimate and necessary to the efficient execution of the abovenamed purposes.

== School of Nursing ==
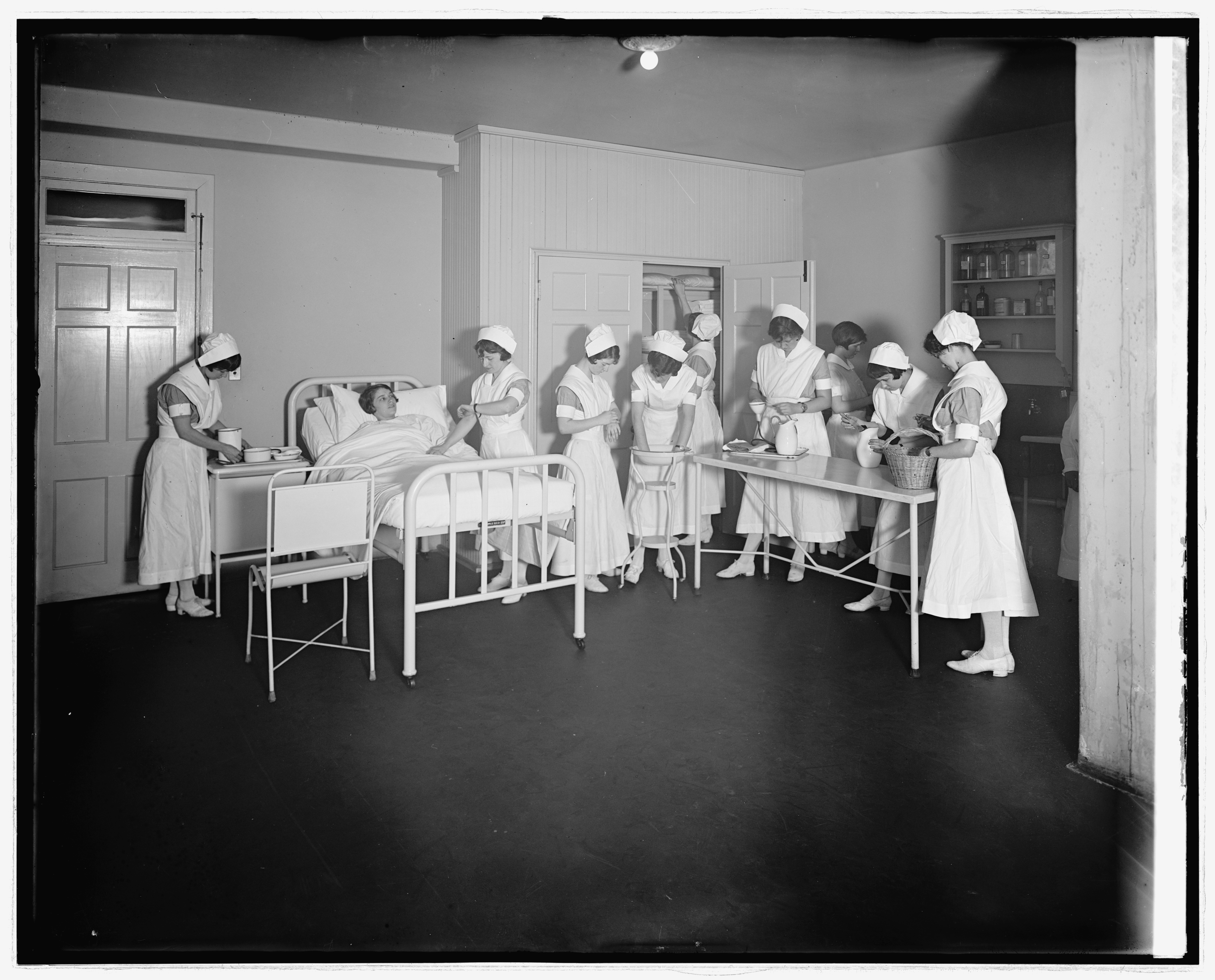
Nurses

A training school for nurses was connected with the hospital. The course of training was three years. Each nurse who successfully completed the course and passed the final examinations was awarded a diploma. The Attending Staff, the Superintendent of the Hospital, and the Supervising Nurse constituted the faculty of the training school. A Training School Committee, composed of members of the Medical Staff, arrange the course of study and training, and had general supervision of the school.

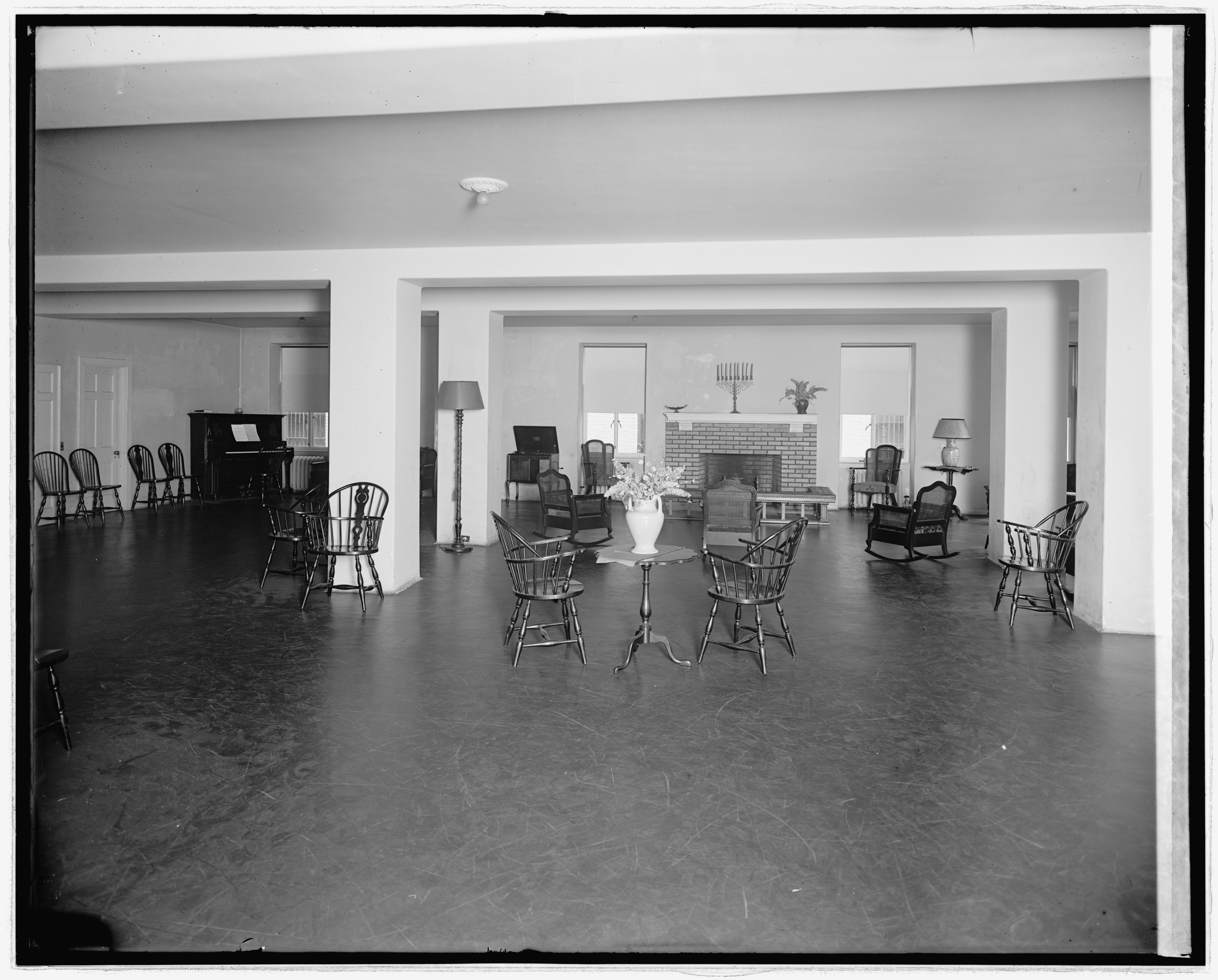
Nurses home

The School of Nursing in connection with the hospital was established in 1893. The staff consisted of thirty pupil nurses. It was the purpose of the school to give three years theoretical and practical instruction in nursing, to graduate nurses well equipped with the knowledge and experience that would permit them to care for the sick, to solve the economic and social problems for which their services were constantly in demand, to accept responsible positions in organized schools and hospitals, to take active part in preventive medicine as social workers, tenement house inspectors, district nurses, and so forth. The school was so situated that pupils could avail themselves of the opportunities for general education, offered in the Capital city. They were encouraged to visit the capital, the libraries, the museums, the art gallery and other public buildings of civic and historical interest, so that their three years in Washington would make them, not only good nurses, but broader and more cultured women.

There was no arbitrary rule as to an applicant's age, but she should preferably be between 20 and 30 years old. A graduate nurse was not permitted to take the examinations necessary to become a registered nurse (R. N.) until she was 23 years old. The applicant was required to be of average size and weight, and to be in good health. A high school education or its equivalent was required.

As so many states had registration for nurses, and many institutions and organizations of nurses required their members to be registered, it was the aim of this school to meet, as far as possible, the maximum requirements of any state, so that the graduates would be eligible to practice as registered nurses in any part of the country, and to be enrolled in the Red Cross Nursing Corps. As the school was non-sectarian, there were no religious services connected with it, but all pupils were expected to attend the place of worship they prefer, once on Sunday.
