= Peters Brook (Stony Brook tributary) =

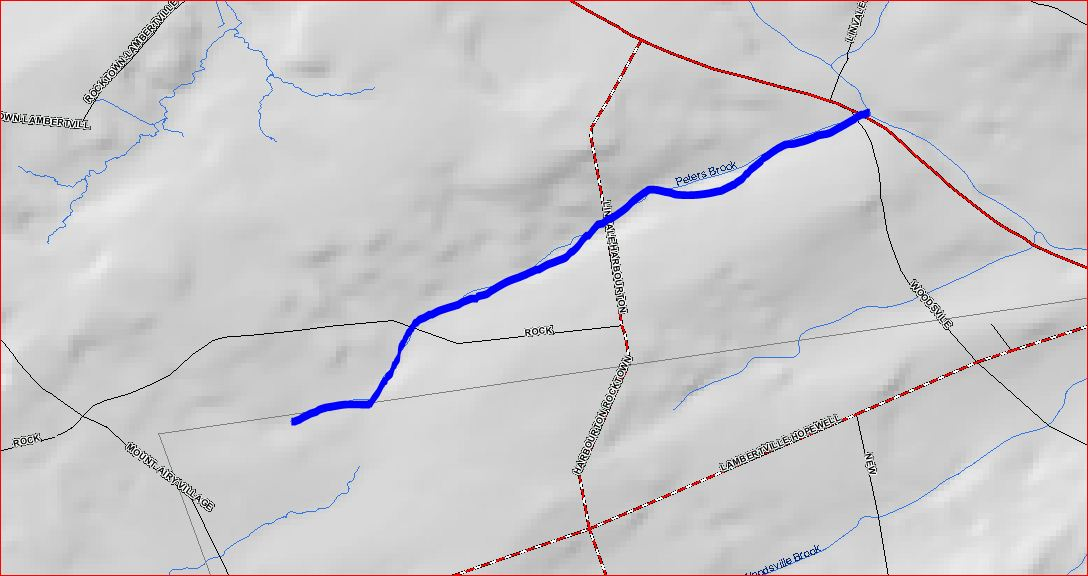
- Map of Peters Brook

Location
- Country: United States

Physical characteristics
- Source
  - coordinates: 40°22′37″N 74°51′55″W
- Mouth
  - coordinates: 40°23′33″N 74°50′3″W
  - elevation: 279 ft (85 m)

Basin features
- Progression: Stony Brook (Millstone River), Millstone River, Raritan River, Atlantic Ocean
- River system: Raritan River system

Peters Brook is a tributary of Stony Brook in Mercer and Hunterdon counties, New Jersey in the United States.

== Course ==
The Peters Brook starts at 40°22′37″N 74°51′55″W, near the intersection of Rock Road East and CR-601 (Mt Airy-Harbourton Road). It flows northeast, crossing Rock Road East and CR-579 (Linvale-Harbourton Road). It flows past the Pine Creek Golf Course before crossing Route 31 and draining into the Stony Brook at 40°23′33″N 74°50′3″W.

== Sister tributaries ==
- Baldwins Creek
- Duck Pond Run
- Honey Branch
- Lewis Brook
- Stony Brook Branch
- Woodsville Brook

== See also ==
- List of rivers of New Jersey
