= Peters (bakery) =

Former British bakery chain

- Company type: Private
- Industry: Bakery
- Founded: 1966
- Defunct: 2012
- Headquarters: Durham, United Kingdom
- Number of locations: 71
- Key people: Peter Knowles (Chairman)
- Number of employees: 580

Peters was a British bakery chain. The business entered into administration in 2012 and the business was acquired by Cooplands of Scarborough.

== History ==
Peter Knowles (born c.1943) was born and raised in County Durham. He trained and worked as a baker in Leeds and London, but returned home to establish a bakery business at Belmont in 1966. A second shop was opened shortly afterwards in Durham city centre. Shops were opened in Teesside and North Tyneside in the mid-1980s.

A rival bakery chain, Harrison's of Spennymoor, with 29 branches, was acquired in the mid-1990s. Following the acquisition Peter's controlled around 70 shops, from Ashington in Northumberland to Northallerton in North Yorkshire.

In 2003 its production plant at Durham was destroyed in a large fire forcing production to move to temporary accommodation in Peterlee until September 2005 when a new £9 million facility was opened on the same site.

Peters Bakery entered into administration in 2012. The business was acquired by Coopland and Son of Scarborough, who retained 22 stores and closed 34.
