= Frank Charles Schrader =

American entomologist

- c. 1918
- Born: October 6, 1860; Sterling, Illinois, US
- Died: April 16, 1944 (aged 83); Washington, D.C., US
- Education: University of Kansas; Harvard University
- Occupations: Geologist, mineralogist, entomologist

Frank Charles Schrader (October 6, 1860 – April 16, 1944) was an American geologist, mineralogist, and entomologist.

== Biography ==
At Harvard, c. 1893

Born in Sterling, Illinois he received degrees from the University of Kansas (BS and MS) and Harvard University (BA and MA), before teaching at Harvard.

Schrader was one of the first federal geologists to explore Alaska. He was associated with the United States Geological Survey, and did research in several other states, including Arizona, Colorado, Idaho, Kansas, Nevada, and New Mexico.

He died at National Homeopathic Hospital in Washington, D.C. on April 16, 1944.
