= Cheapman Bay =

Coordinates: 54°9′S 37°31′W

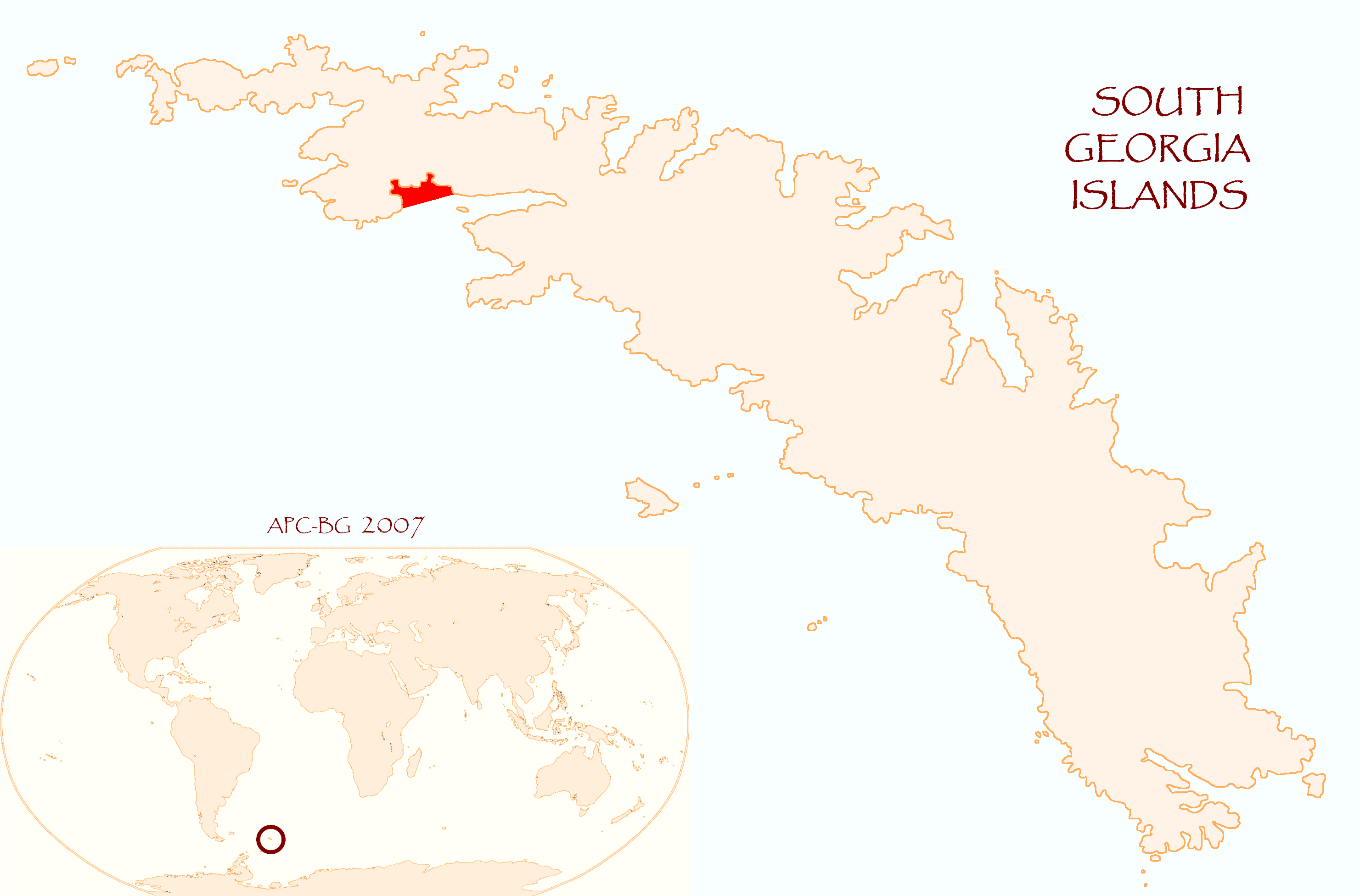
Location of Cheapman Bay on South Georgia Island

Cheapman Bay is a bay 4 miles (6.4 km) wide, indenting the south coast of South Georgia close west of King Haakon Bay. The name Cheapman Strand was given to a feature in this vicinity by an American sealing expedition which visited South Georgia in 1877–78. The name was recorded as Chapman Strand and applied to this bay by Matthews in 1931. Langestrand (long beach) has been used locally for the beach at the head of the bay and appeared for the bay itself on a British Admiralty chart of 1931. However, the South Georgia Survey, 1951–52, reported that "Langestrand" is a descriptive term, not a placename, and is applied by sealers to at least four other beaches in South Georgia. To avoid confusion, the name Cheapman Bay has been approved for this feature and all other names rejected.
