= Peters Glacier (Alaska Range) =

Glacier in the United States

- Hanna Glacier; Hudeetsedle Toyaane
- Location within Alaska
- Interactive map of Peters Glacier
- Type: Valley glacier
- Location: Denali Borough, Alaska, U.S.
- Coordinates: 63°10′52″N 151°00′09″W
- Status: unknown

Peters Glacier, also known as Hanna Glacier and Hudeetsedle Toyaane', is a glacier in Denali National Park and Preserve in the U.S. state of Alaska. The glacier runs from the Peters Basin icefield in a deep valley to the north of Denali's Wickersham Wall, between Denali and Peters Dome, falling from the icefield via the Tluna Icefall, where it is joined by Jeffery Glacier. It exits the Alaska Range to the north, forming the source of the Muddy River. Peters Glacier was named by A.H. Brooks for U.S. Geological Survey topographer William John Peters, who surveyed in Alaska from 1898 to 1902. Until 1947 it was named Hanna Glacier for U.S. Senator from Ohio Marcus Alonzo Hanna, a friend of President William McKinley.

== See also ==
- List of glaciers
