= Peters Dome =

Alaskan mountain range in Denali National Park

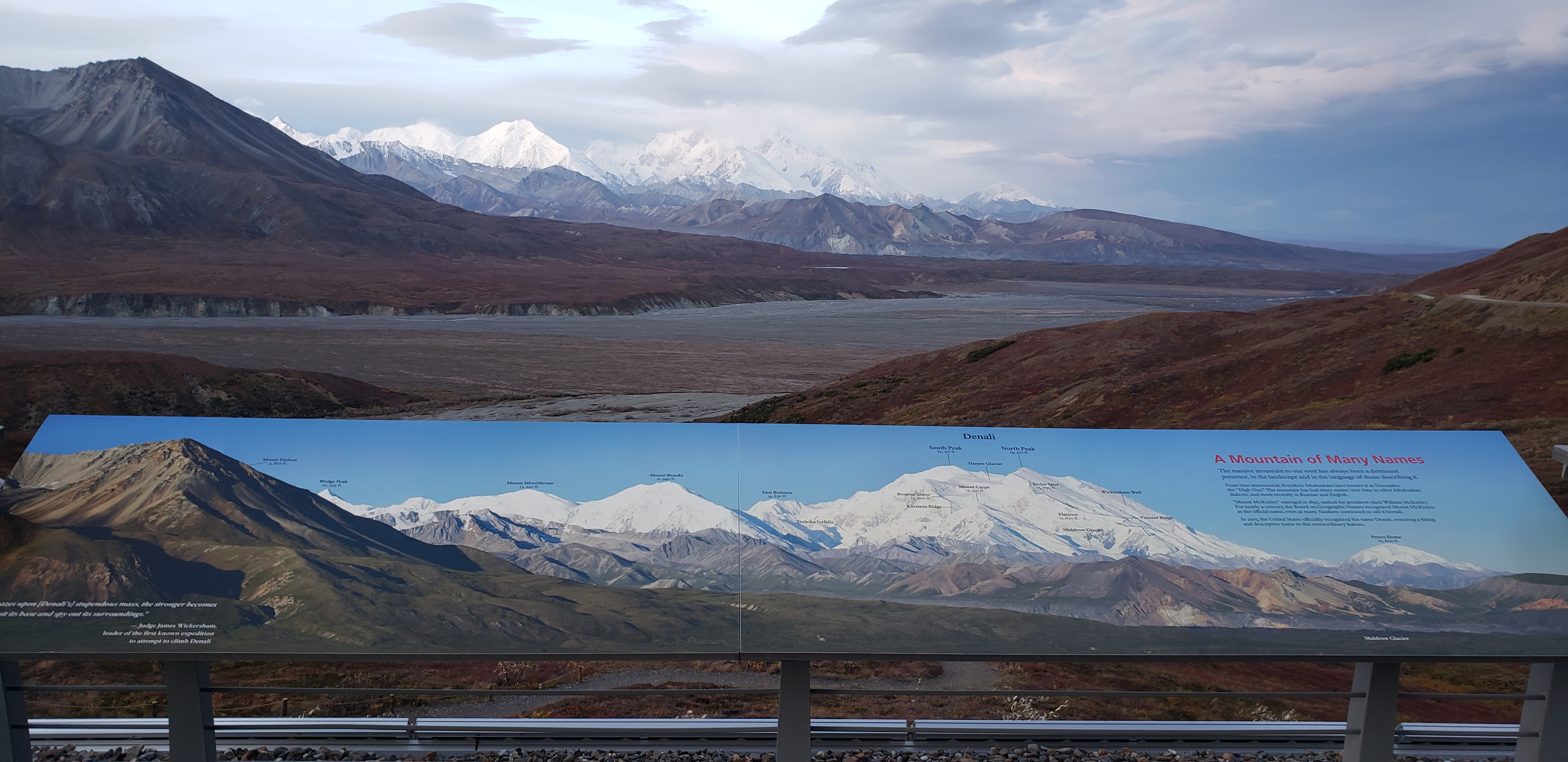

Highest point
- Elevation: 10,571 ft (3,222 m)
- Prominence: 2,500 ft (760 m)
- Parent peak: Denali
- Coordinates: 63°08′13″N 151°12′09″W

Geography
- Location within Alaska
- Location: Denali Borough, Alaska, United States
- Parent range: Alaska Range
- Topo map: USGS Mount McKinley A-3

Climbing
- Easiest route: basic snow/ice

Peters Dome is a 10,571-foot (3,222 m) mountain in the central Alaska Range, in Denali National Park, 7.6 mi (12 km) northwest of Denali. It is separated from Denali by a deep glacial valley, the Peters Basin, which is the source of Peters Glacier, about 3,000 feet (910 m) below Peters Dome's summit. It is described as a glacier-covered dome.

== See also ==
- Mountain peaks of Alaska
