= Peters Glacier (Brooks Range) =

Glacier in the United States

- Location within Alaska
- Interactive map of Peters Glacier
- Location: North Slope Borough, Alaska, U.S.
- Coordinates: 69°16′51″N 144°57′23″W
- Status: unknown

Peters Glacier is a glacier in the Arctic National Wildlife Refuge in the U.S. state of Alaska. The glacier is on the west side of 8,901-foot (2,713 m) Mount Chamberlin, one of the tallest mountains in the eastern end of the Brooks Range. The glacier was named in 1959 by the U.S. Air Force Cambridge Research Center for nearby Lake Peters.

== See also ==
- List of glaciers
