= Tom Choate =

American mountaineer (born 1934)

- Born: 1934 (age 91–92)
- Known for: Oldest person to have climbed Denali

Tom Choate (born 1934) is an American mountaineer.

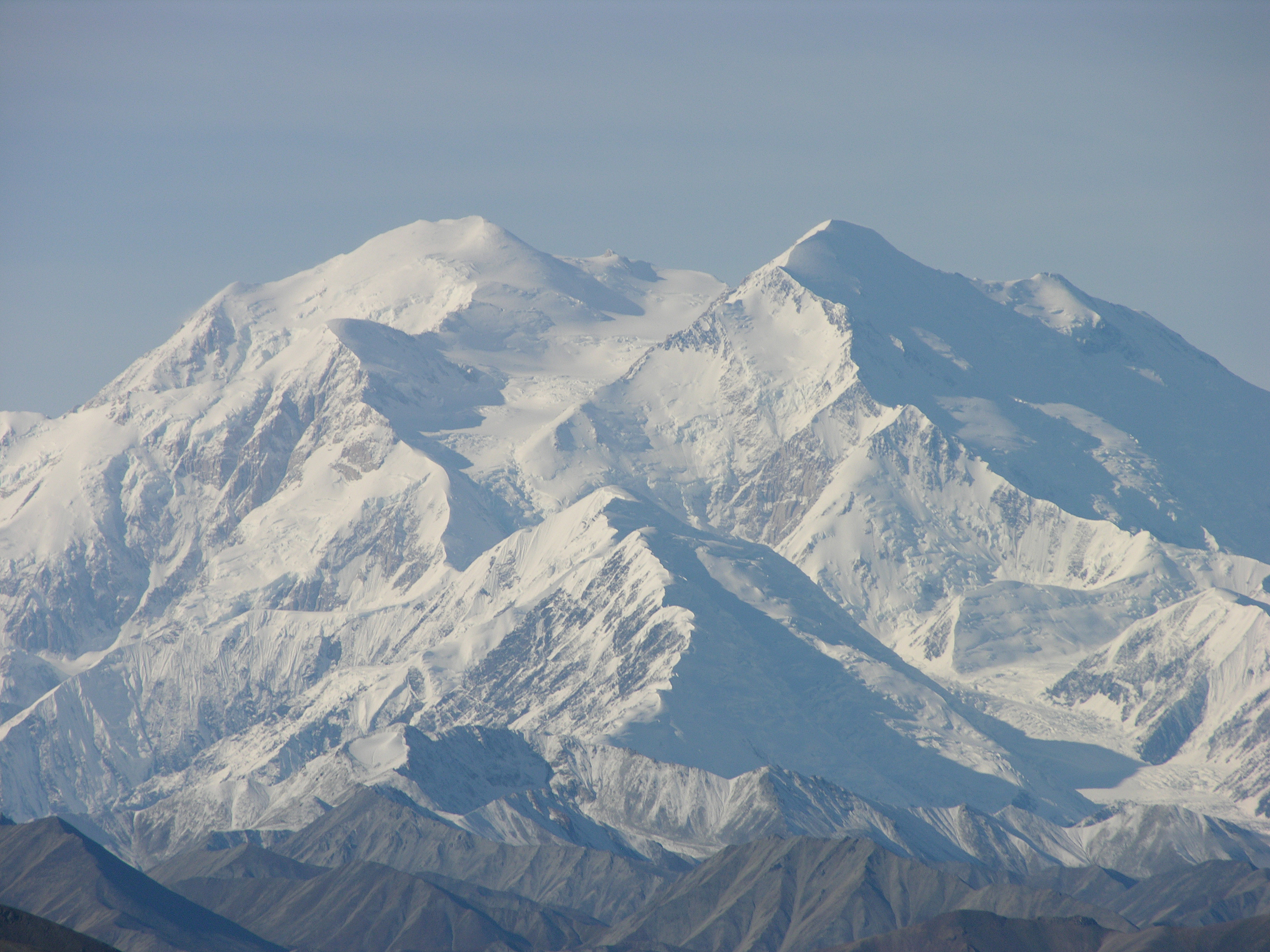
Denali

On June 28, 2013, the centennial anniversary of the first ascent of Denali, Choate was recognized as the oldest person to summit Denali at the age of 78 years old. He has reached the peak of Denali multiple times, spanning across five different decades: in 1963, 1983, 1993, 2003, and lastly in 2013.

== Career and education ==
Tom Choate graduated from Colorado A&M, now called Colorado State University, withholding a B.S. degree, and later received both a M.A. and Ph.D. from the University of Montana. After graduating from Colorado A&M, Tom traveled to Alaska in search of prosperous jobs. He needed employment to avoid being drafted into the Korean War, so Tom, along with a friend, traveled to Alaska. Unfortunately, jobs were scarce and Tom eventually joined the Alaska National Guard working as a ski infantryman and radio operator. After the war was over, Tom became the first Ranger Naturalist in 1957 for Denali National Park formerly known as Mount McKinley National Park. Tom and Charlu married in '62. They then moved to New Zealand. Tom spent four years doing Antarctic research on penguins and its predators. After spending four years in New Zealand, Tom moved his family to South Africa in the late 60s and spent over ten years on the continent launching climbs to Kilimanjaro and many other outdoor activities. Tom then moved his family to Anchorage, Alaska in the late 70s and worked throughout the 80s as a Biology professor at Anchorage Community College, now called University of Alaska Anchorage.

== Mountaineering experiences ==
Summited Denali in 1967, 1983, 1993, 2003, and 2013 located in Denali National Park.

Climbed Sunlight Mountain (South Face) on August 17, 1967, located in Chugach State Park.

Ascended Bellicose Peak (Shroud Glacier) on August 14, 1987, located in Chugach State Park.

Summited Baleful Peak (Northeast Ridge) on June 25, 1990, located in Chugach State Park.

Peaked West Kiliak (South Face) & Nantina Point (South face) in August 1990 located in Chugach State Park.

Ascended Talkeetna Glacier on April 28, 1994, located in Chugach State Park.

Climbed Chickaloon Glacier in 1995 located in Chugach State Park.

Summited Mount Isto in 1999 located in the Brooks Range.

Traversed both Mount Hunter and Mount Foraker in July 1963 located in the Alaska Range.

Climbed Mount Wickersham on July 16, 1987, located in Chugach State Park.

Ascended Mount Wilbur in the Summer of 1961 located in Montana's Glacier National Park.

Peaked Mount Torbert in 1988 located in the Tordrillo Mountains.

== Antarctic experience ==
With the sponsorship by Otago University, handed over by Dominion Museum, Tom Choate was able to continue his research of Antarctic Skuas (Catharacta maccormicki) and Adelie penguins (Pygoscelis adeliae), stationed at Cape Hallett in '66 and '67.

== South Africa experience ==
Tom Choate, a member of the Mountain Club of Rhodesia, established many routes and accomplished many climbs. According to notes of the '72 Alpine Journal by Charles Kemp, Tom Choate was the first person to climb the Finger of God and Yum Yum Gully. He led new climbs to Lion's head, put up new route to Banji peak, and a new climb to Mutiwaura, later to be called "Afterbirth" following Choate's birthday. In a triennial report from 1971 to 1973 of the Alpine Journal by Charles Kemp, Tom Choate put up a new climb to a rock called "The Sentinel," which he later name the route "Staghounds at Bay." Tom Choate and Pat Sweet also cleared a route to Gopora, to which they named the route "Buddha." Tom Choate led twenty-five MCR (Mountain Club of Rhodesia) members to a long week-end into the Matusadona Game Reserve.

== Nepal experience ==
Tom Choate and Pat Sweet climbed Buddha's peak in 1972.
