= Mount Nagishlamina =

Mountain in Alaska, United States

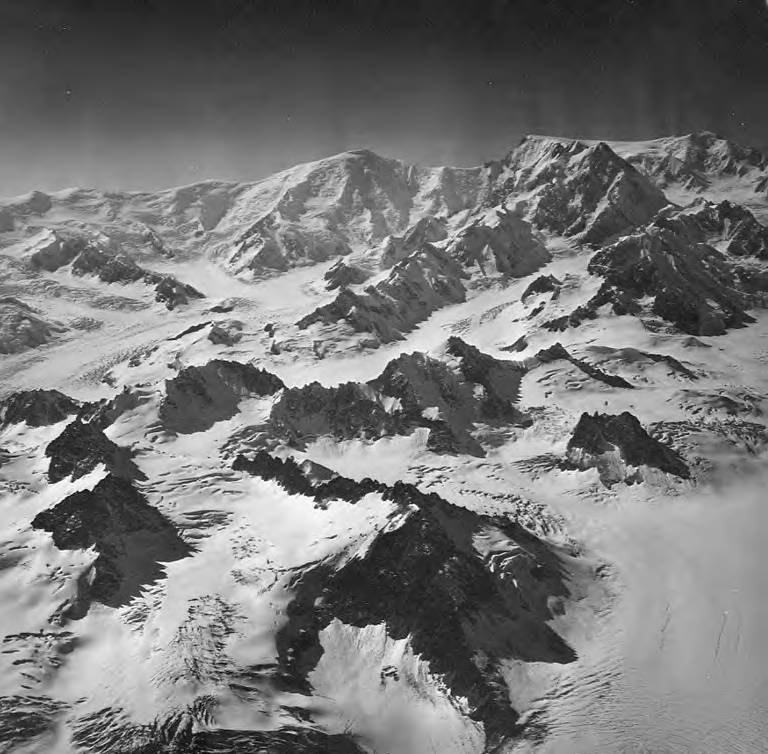
- Mount Nagishlamina centered in distance {Mount Torbert in upper right)

Highest point
- Elevation: 11,068 ft (3,374 m)
- Prominence: 1,368 ft (417 m)
- Parent peak: Mount Torbert (11,413 ft)
- Isolation: 1.95 mi (3.14 km)
- Coordinates: 61°23′03″N 152°23′09″W

Geography
- Location within Alaska
- Interactive map of Mount Nagishlamina
- Location: Kenai Peninsula Borough; Alaska, United States
- Parent range: Tordrillo Mountains; Alaska Range
- Topo map: USGS Tyonek B-7

Climbing
- First ascent: 1989, Dave Johnston

Mount Nagishlamina is an 11,068-foot (3,374 meter) glaciated mountain summit located in the Tordrillo Mountains of the Alaska Range, in the US state of Alaska. The mountain is situated 90 mi (145 km) west of Anchorage, 7.4 mi (12 km) northwest of Mount Spurr, and 1.9 mi (3 km) southeast of Mount Torbert, which is the nearest higher neighbor. It is the fifth-highest peak in the Tordrillo Mountains, a subset of the Alaska Range. The mountain takes its Denaʼina language name from the Nagishlamina River which drains the west side of the peak. Mount Nagishlamina's name was in use by local mountaineers since the 1970s, and was officially adopted in 1999 by the U.S. Board on Geographic Names. This geographic feature was likely the highest unclimbed peak in the United States at the time of its first ascent in 1989 by Dave Johnston.

== Climate ==
Based on the Köppen climate classification, Mount Nagishlamina is located in a tundra climate zone with long, cold, snowy winters, and cool summers. Weather systems are forced upwards by the Alaska Range (orographic lift), causing heavy precipitation in the form of snowfall. Winter temperatures can drop below −10 °F with wind chill factors below −20 °F. This climate supports the Harpoon and Capps Glaciers surrounding the peak. Precipitation runoff from the mountain and meltwater from its glaciers empties into Cook Inlet. The months May through June offer the most favorable weather for viewing or climbing the peak.

== Gallery ==
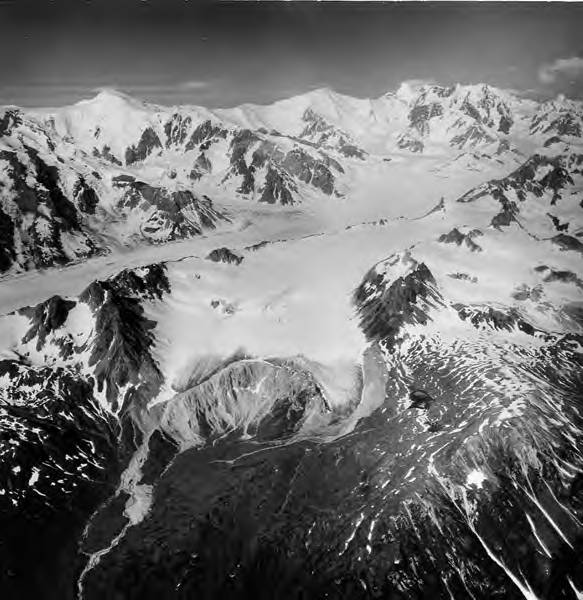
Mount Chichantna, Mount Nagishlamina, and Mount Torbert

== See also ==
- List of mountain peaks of Alaska
- Geography of Alaska
