= The Rowel =

Mountain summit in Alaska, United States

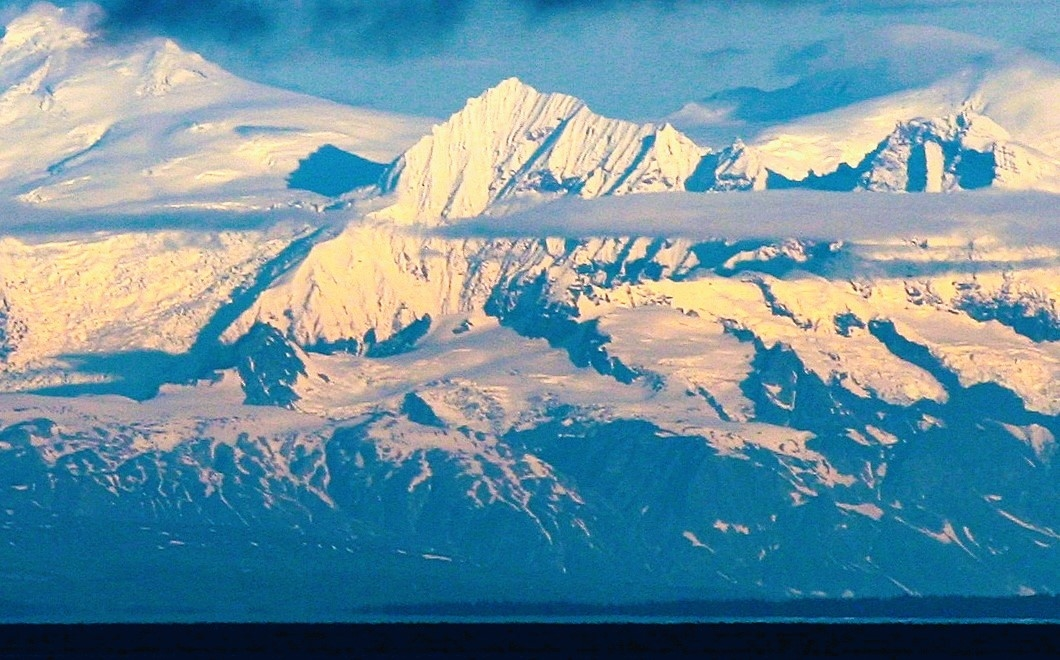
- East aspect

Highest point
- Elevation: 9,806 ft (2,989 m)
- Prominence: 1,056 ft (322 m)
- Parent peak: Mount Spurr
- Isolation: 2.13 mi (3.43 km)
- Coordinates: 61°18′49″N 152°11′41″W

Naming
- Etymology: Rowel

Geography
- Location within Alaska
- Interactive map of The Rowel
- Country: United States
- State: Alaska
- Borough: Kenai Peninsula
- Parent range: Alaska Range; Tordrillo Mountains
- Topo map: USGS Tyonek B-6

Climbing
- Easiest route: Expedition climbing

The Rowel is a 9,806-foot-elevation (2,989-meter) mountain summit in Alaska.

== Description ==
The Rowel is located 77 miles (124 km) west of Anchorage in the Tordrillo Mountains which are a subrange of the Alaska Range. The remote glaciated peak ranks as the 10th-highest peak in the Tordrillo Mountains, and 598th-highest summit in Alaska. It is set 2.1 mi (3 km) northeast of Mount Spurr which is the nearest higher summit. Precipitation runoff from the peak's north slope drains to the Chichantna River, whereas the south and east slopes drain to the Chakachatna River. Topographic relief is significant as the east face rises over 4,800 feet (1,463 meters) in one mile (1.6 km). The mountain's descriptive name "rowel" refers to the sharp-toothed wheel on the end of a spur and the toponym was officially adopted in 1999 by the United States Board on Geographic Names. The name is a pun as this sharp peak is situated around the perimeter of Mt. Spurr.

== Climate ==
Based on the Köppen climate classification, The Rowel is located in a tundra climate zone with long, cold, snowy winters, and cool summers. Weather systems are forced upwards by the Alaska Range (orographic lift), causing heavy precipitation in the form of snowfall. Winter temperatures can drop below −10 °F (−23 °C) with wind chill factors below −20 °F (−29 °C). This climate supports glaciers surrounding the peak including the Capps Glacier to the northeast. The months May through June offer the most favorable weather for viewing or climbing.

== Gallery ==
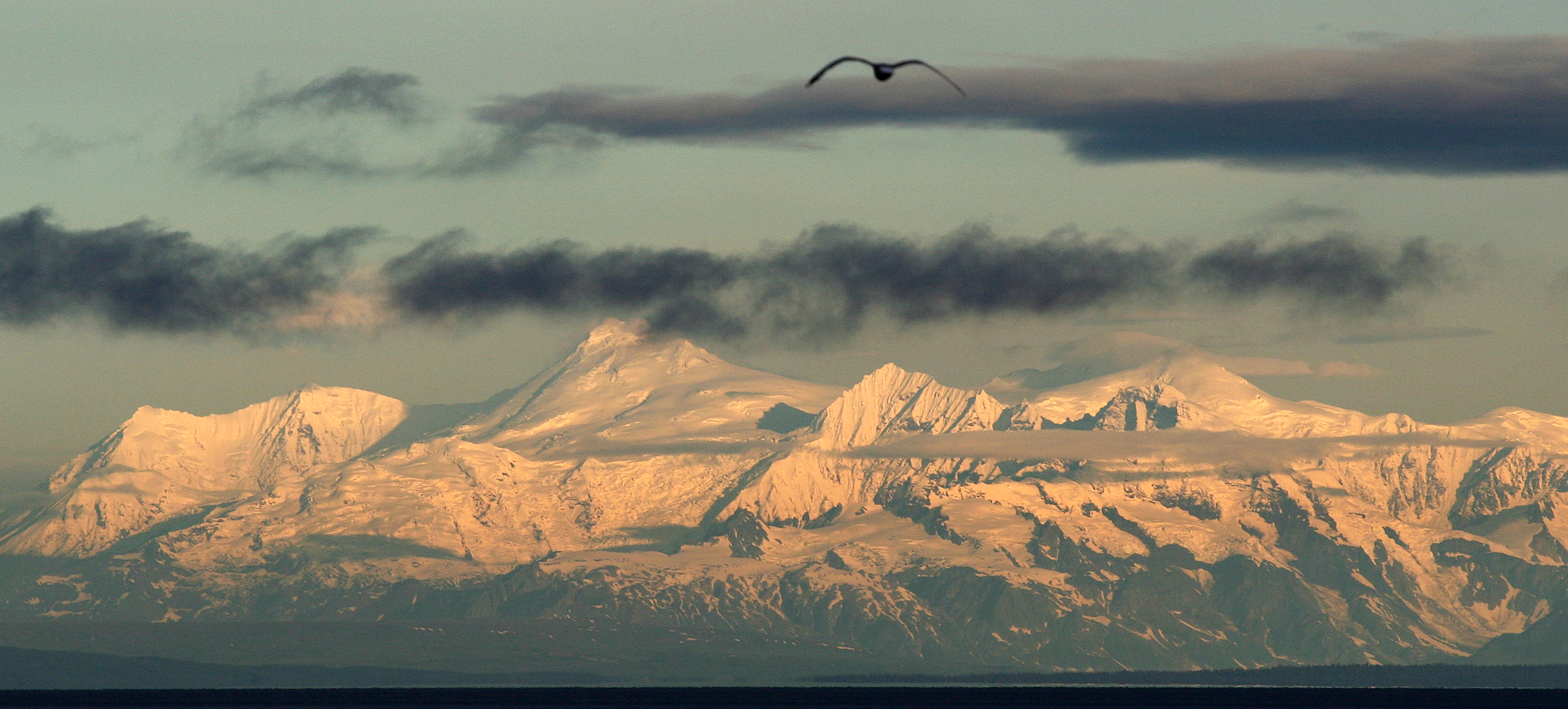
Mount Spurr, The Rowel, and Mount Chichantna seen from Anchorage

== See also ==
- Mountain peaks of Alaska
- Geography of Alaska
