= Southcentral Alaska =

Region of the U.S. state of Alaska

Coordinates: 60°N 150°W

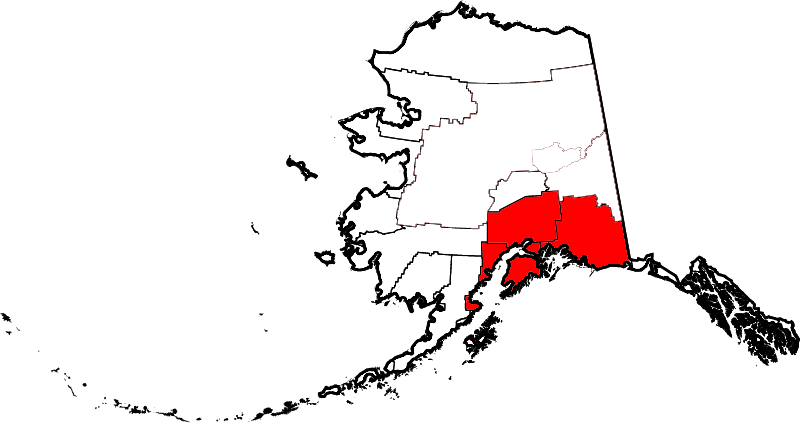
Map of Southcentral Alaska

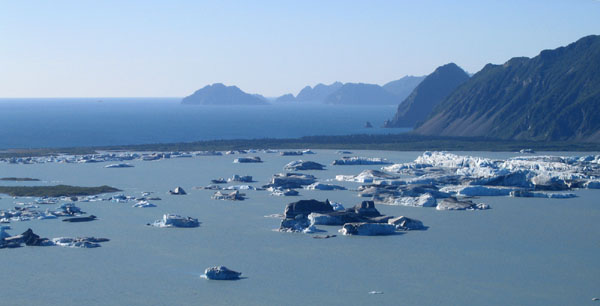
Bear Glacier Lake and the Pacific Ocean in the Kenai Fjords

Southcentral Alaska, also known as the Gulf Coast Region, is the portion of the U.S. state of Alaska consisting of the shorelines and uplands of the central Gulf of Alaska. More than half of the state's entire population lives in this region, concentrated in and around the city of Anchorage. The region is Alaska’s best-connected region, with the Port of Anchorage, Ted Stevens Anchorage International Airport, and the Alaska Railroad servicing the area.

The area includes Cook Inlet, the Matanuska-Susitna Valley, the Kenai Peninsula, Prince William Sound, and the Copper River Valley. Tourism, fisheries, and petroleum production are important economic activities.

== Cities ==
The major city is Anchorage. Other major towns include Palmer, Wasilla, Kenai, Soldotna, Homer, Seward, Valdez, and Cordova.

== Climate ==
The climate of Southcentral Alaska is subarctic. Temperatures range from an average high of 65 °F (18 °C) in July to an average low of 10 °F (−12 °C) in December. The hours of daylight per day vary from 20 hours in June and July to 6 hours in December and January. The coastal areas consist of temperate rainforests and alder shrublands. The interior areas are covered by boreal forests.

== Mountains ==
The terrain of Southcentral Alaska is shaped by seven mountain ranges:

- Alaska Range
- Talkeetna Mountains
- Wrangell Mountains
- Chugach Mountains
- Kenai Mountains
- Tordrillo Mountains
- Aleutian Range

Southcentral Alaska contains several dormant and active volcanoes. The Wrangell Volcanoes are older, lie in the East, and include Mount Blackburn, Mount Bona, Mount Churchill, Mount Drum, Mount Gordon, Mount Jarvis, Mount Sanford, and Mount Wrangell. The Cook Inlet volcanoes, located in the Tordrillo Mountains and at the north end of the Aleutian Range, are newer, lie in the West, and include Mount Redoubt, Mount Iliamna, Hayes Volcano, Mount Augustine, Fourpeaked Mountain, and Mount Spurr. Most recently, Augustine and Fourpeaked erupted in 2006, and Mount Redoubt erupted in March 2009, resulting in airplane flight cancellations.

== See also ==
- Anchorage Metropolitan Area
- Chugach Census Area, Alaska
- Copper River Census Area, Alaska
- Matanuska-Susitna Valley
- Kenai Peninsula Borough, Alaska
