= Chandalar Lake Airport =

- IATA: WCR; ICAO: PALR; FAA LID: WCR

Summary
- Airport type: Public
- Owner: State of Alaska DOT&PF - Northern Region
- Serves: Chandalar, Alaska
- Elevation AMSL: 1,920 ft (590 m)
- Coordinates: 67°30′16″N 148°28′59″W

Map
- Location of airport in Alaska

Runways
| Direction | Length | | Surface |
| Direction | ft | m | Surface |
|---|---|---|---|
| 3/21 | 3,000 | 914 | Gravel/dirt |

Statistics (2015)
- Aircraft operations: 300
- Based aircraft: 0
- Source: Federal Aviation Administration

Chandalar Lake Airport (IATA: WCR, ICAO: PALR, FAA LID: WCR) is a state-owned public-use airport located at Chandalar Lake in Alaska. This airport is included in the National Plan of Integrated Airport Systems for 2011–2015, which categorized it as a general aviation airport.

== Facilities and aircraft ==
Chandalar Lake Airport covers an area of 211 acres (85 ha) at an elevation of 1,920 feet (585 m) above mean sea level. It has one runway designated 4/22 with a gravel surface measuring 3,000 by 60 feet (914 x 18 m). For the 12-month period ending December 31, 2005, the airport had 300 aircraft operations, an average of 25 per month: 67% general aviation and 33% air taxi.

== See also ==
- List of airports in Alaska
