= Ch'akajabena Mountain =

Mountain in Alaska, United States

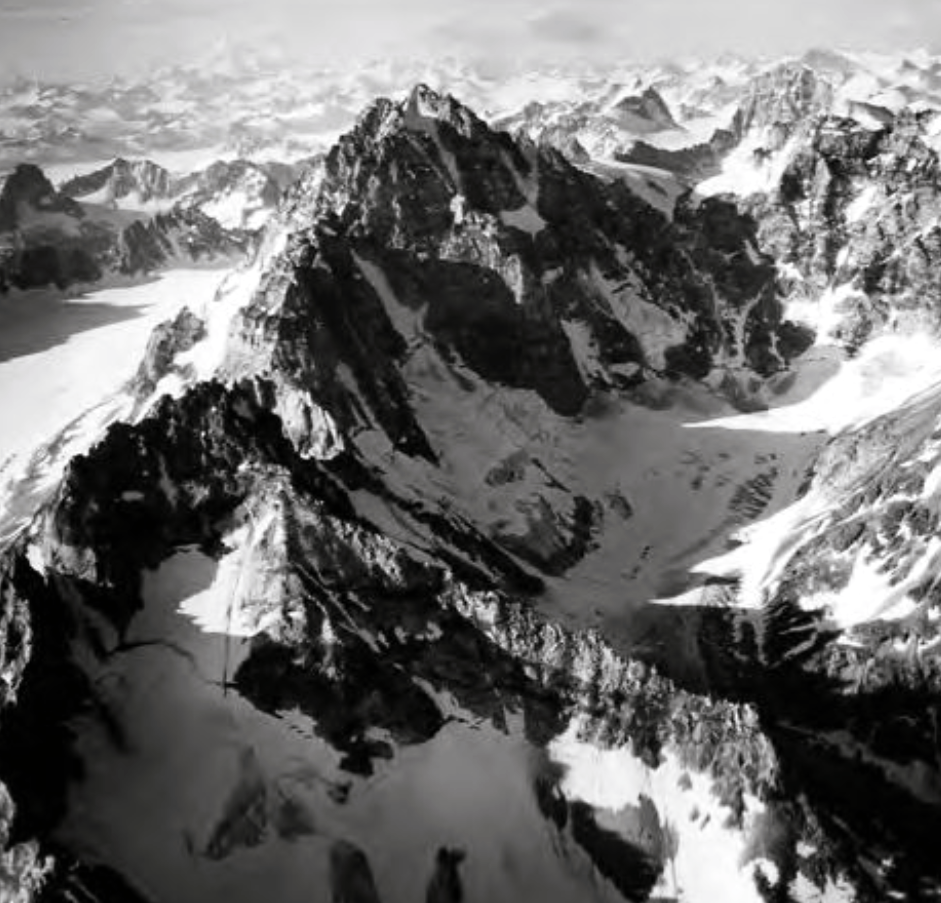
- North aspect in 1965

Highest point
- Elevation: 7,530 ft (2,295 m)
- Prominence: 1,730 ft (527 m)
- Isolation: 1.66 mi (2.67 km)
- Coordinates: 61°09′39″N 152°25′36″W

Geography
- Location within Alaska
- Country: United States
- State: Alaska
- Borough: Kenai Peninsula Borough
- Parent range: Aleutian Range; Neacola Mountains
- Topo map: USGS Tyonek A-7

Ch'akajabena Mountain is a 7,530-foot-elevation (2,295-meter) mountain summit in Alaska.

== Description ==
Ch'akajabena Mountain ranks as the seventh-highest peak in the Neacola Mountains which are the northernmost subrange of the Aleutian Range. The mountain is located 85 miles (137 km) west of Anchorage near Ch'akajabena Lake. Precipitation runoff and glacial meltwater from the mountain drains to Cook Inlet via the Chakachatna River. Topographic relief is significant as the summit rises over 3,500 feet (1,067 meters) above a glacier in the north cirque in one-half mile (0.8 km). The mountain's toponym was officially adopted in 2005 by the United States Board on Geographic Names. The mountain is named in association with Ch'akajabena Lake which in the Denaʼina language means "tail extends-out lake."

== Climate ==
According to the Köppen climate classification system, Ch'akajabena Mountain is located in a tundra climate zone with cold, snowy winters, and cool summers. Weather systems coming off the North Pacific are forced upwards by the mountains (orographic lift), causing heavy precipitation in the form of rainfall and snowfall. Winter temperatures can drop below 0 °F with wind chill factors below −10 °F. This climate supports three unnamed glaciers surrounding the peak.

== See also ==
- List of mountain peaks of Alaska
- Geography of Alaska
