= Mount Gerdine =

Mountain in Alaska, United States

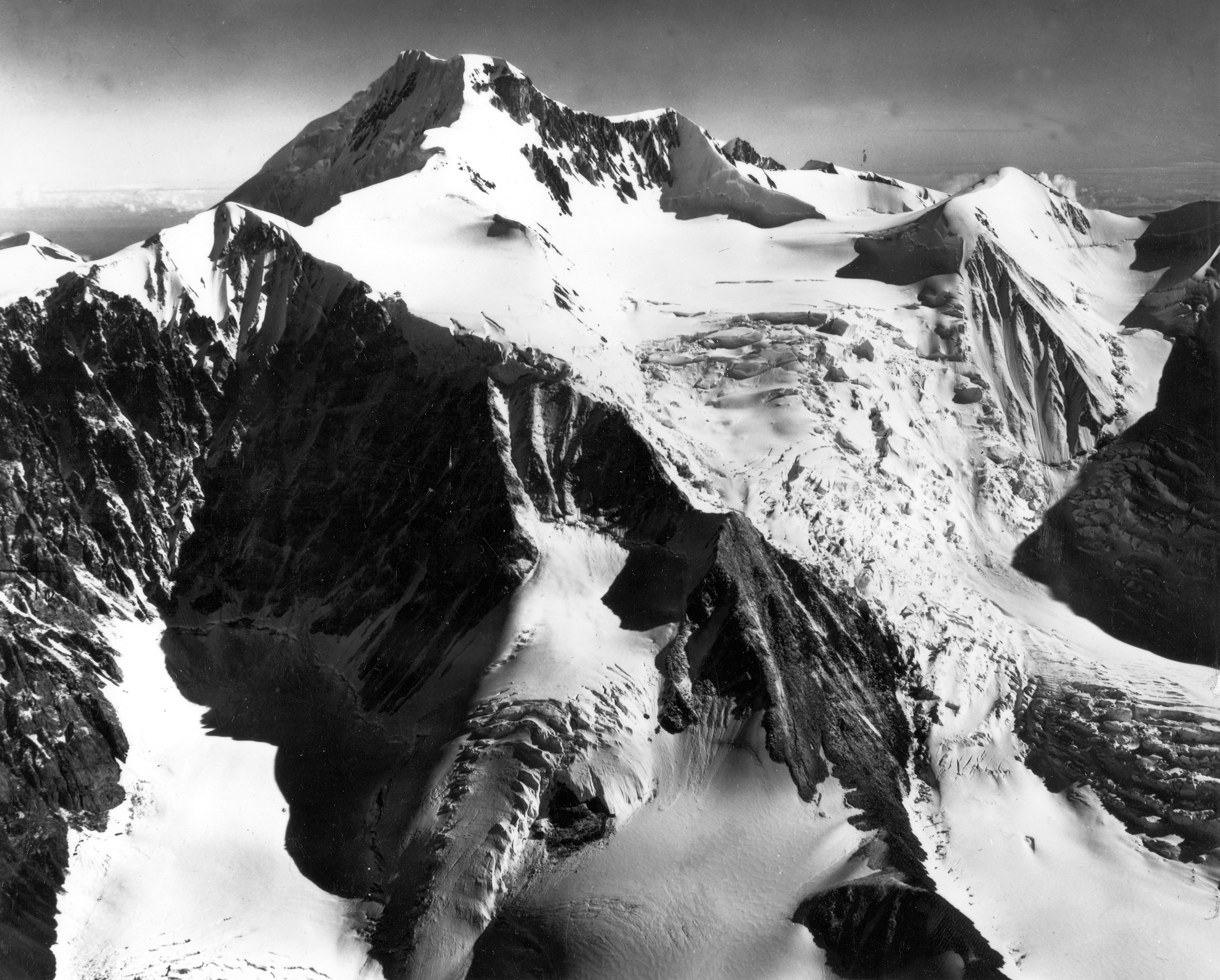
- Aerial view of southwest aspect

Highest point
- Elevation: 11,258 ft (3,431 m)
- Prominence: 3,008 ft (917 m)
- Parent peak: Mount Torbert
- Isolation: 11.71 mi (18.85 km)
- Listing: Highest Major Summits of US
- Coordinates: 61°34′38″N 152°26′32″W

Naming
- Etymology: Thomas Golding Gerdine

Geography
- Location within Alaska
- Interactive map of Mount Gerdine
- Country: United States
- State: Alaska
- Borough: Matanuska-Susitna
- Parent range: Alaska Range; Tordrillo Mountains
- Topo map: USGS Tyonek C-7

Climbing
- First ascent: 1963
- Easiest route: Expedition climbing

Mount Gerdine is an 11,258-foot-elevation (3,431-meter) mountain summit in Alaska.

== Description ==
Mount Gerdine is located 90 miles (145 km) west-northwest of Anchorage in the Tordrillo Mountains, which are a subrange of the Alaska Range. The remote glaciated Gerdine ranks as the second-highest peak in the Tordrillo Mountains, and 201st-highest summit in Alaska. It is set 11.18 mi (18 km) north of Mount Torbert which is the nearest higher peak. Topographic relief is significant as the west face rises over 4,400 feet (1,341 meters) in one mile (1.6 km).

== History ==
The mountain's name honors Thomas Golding Gerdine (1872–1930), U.S. Geological Survey topographic engineer who made several reconnaissance trips in Alaska at the end of the 19th century. He is credited with first ascents of Glacier Peak, Black Mountain, and White Chuck Mountain. The toponym was officially adopted in 1931 by the United States Board on Geographic Names. The first ascent of Mt. Gerdine's summit was made on May 5, 1963, by Rod Wilson, Lowell Thomas Jr., Dr. George Wichman, Paul Crews Jr., and Paul Crews Sr.

== Climate ==
Based on the Köppen climate classification, Mount Gerdine is located in a tundra climate zone with long, cold, snowy winters, and cool summers. Weather systems are forced upwards by the Alaska Range (orographic lift), causing heavy precipitation in the form of snowfall. Winter temperatures can drop below −10 °F with wind chill factors below −20 °F. This climate supports the Hayes Glacier and the North and South Branches of the Trimble Glacier surrounding the peak. The months May through June offer the most favorable weather for viewing or climbing.

== Gallery ==
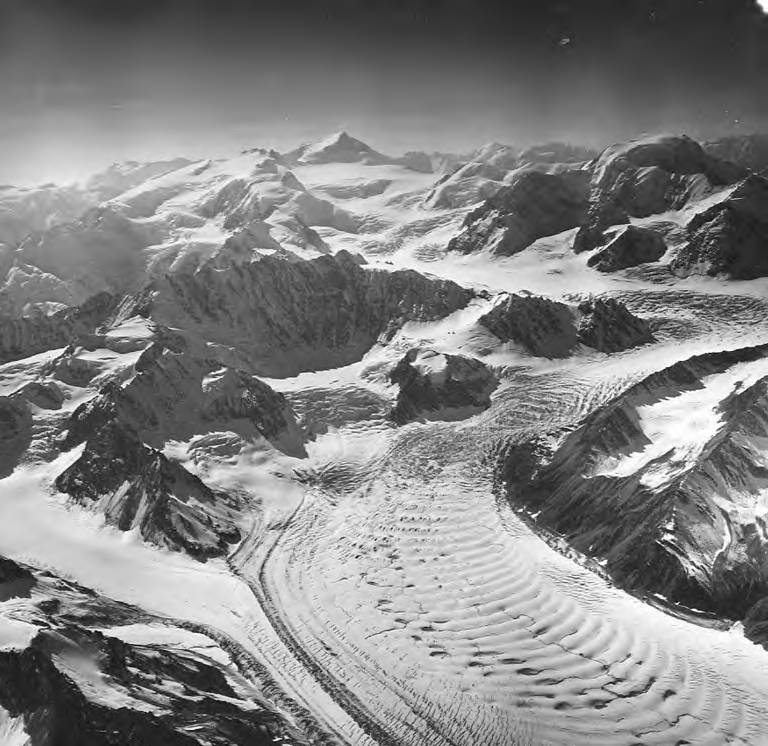
Mount Gerdine centered at top, with North Trimble Glacier

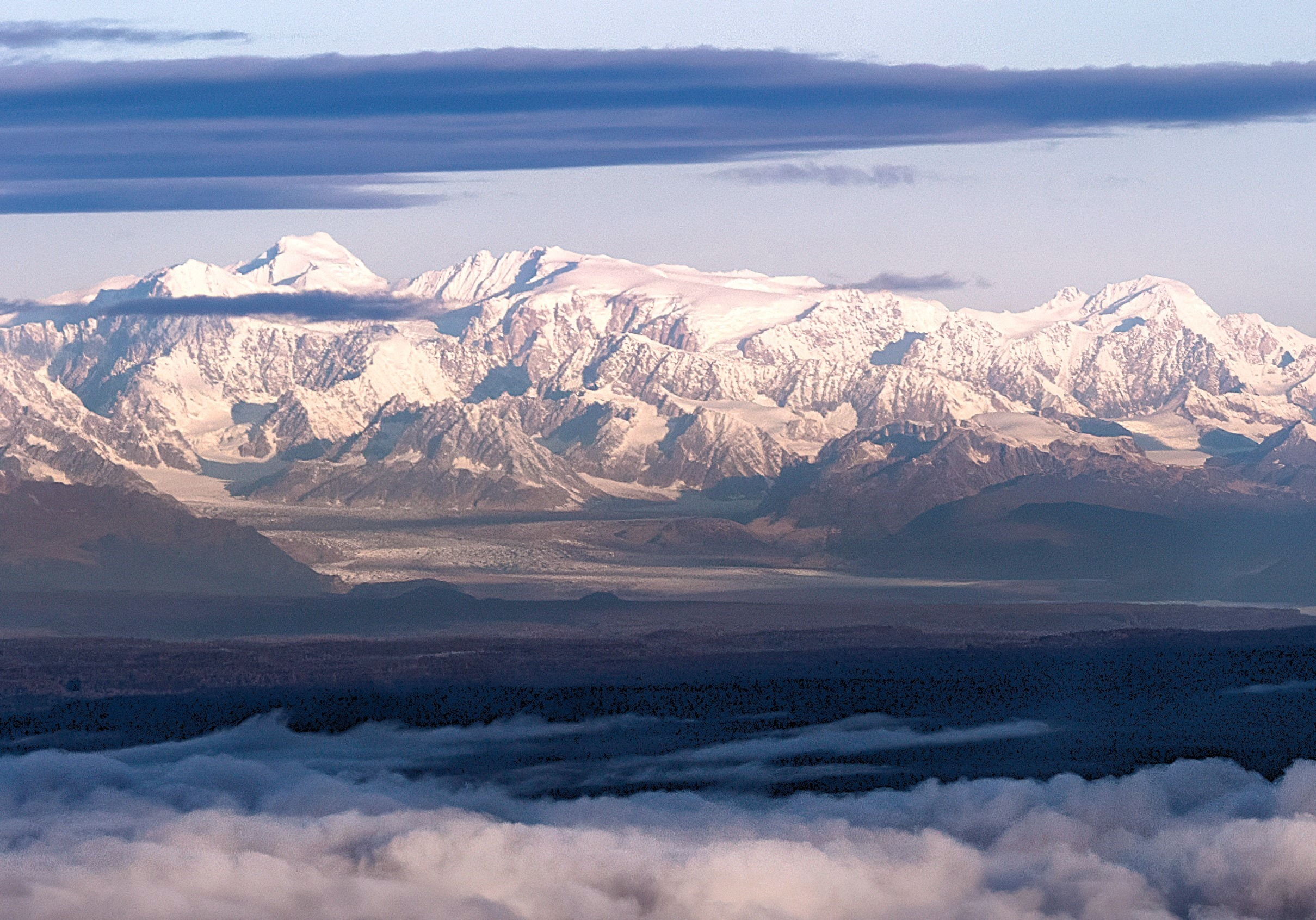
Mount Gerdine is the highest peak to left

== See also ==
- Mountain peaks of Alaska
- Geography of Alaska
