= Hubley =

Hubley can refer to:

== People ==
- Allan Hubley (born 1958), Canadian municipal politician
- Edward Burd Hubley (1792–1856), member of the U.S. House of Representatives from Pennsylvania
- Emily Hubley, contemporary American filmmaker and animator
- Faith Hubley (1924–2001), American animator, spouse of John Hubley
- Georgia Hubley (born 1960), American percussionist, vocalist, and visual artist
- John Hubley (1914–1977), American animation director and producer, spouse of Faith Hubley
- Libbe Hubley (born 1942), Canadian politician
- Roberta Hubley (born 1941), former Canadian politician
- Season Hubley (born 1951), American actress and singer
- Whip Hubley (born 1957), American actor

== Geography ==
- Hubley, Nova Scotia located in Halifax Regional Municipality, Nova Scotia, Canada
- Hubley Township, Schuylkill County, Pennsylvania
- Mount Hubley (disambiguation), several mountains

== Companies ==
- The Hubley Manufacturing Company, a producer of cast-metal toys
