= Mount Michelson (Brooks Range) =

Mountain in Alaska, United States

- Location within Alaska

Highest point
- Elevation: 8,852 ft (2,698 m)
- Coordinates: 69°18′28″N 144°16′03″W

Geography
- Location: North Slope Borough, Alaska
- Parent range: Brooks Range
- Topo map: USGS Mount Michelson B-1

Climbing
- First ascent: April 23, 1957 by John P. Thomson and R. E. "Pete" Isto
- Easiest route: South Face to East Ridge: glacier/snow climb, Alaska Grade 1

Mount Michelson is a high peak in the Romanzof Mountains, part of the Brooks Range of northern Alaska in the United States. It is located about 15 miles (24 km) north of the highest peak in the range, Mount Isto. In 2015 new measurement show that Mount Michelson is the fourth highest mountain at the range, measuring at 8,852 feet (2,698 meters).

The mountain was named by E. de K. Leffingwell, between 1906 and 1914, for Professor Albert Abraham Michelson, an American scientist.
