= Mount Hubley =

Mount Hubley may refer to:

- Mount Hubley (Alaska), the second highest peak in the Brooks Range, Alaska, USA
- Mount Hubley (Antarctica)
