= Mount Hubley (Alaska) =

Mountain in Alaska, United States

- Location within Alaska Location within North America

Highest point
- Elevation: 8,917 ft (2,718 m)
- Prominence: 1,617 ft (493 m)
- Parent peak: Mount Isto
- Coordinates: 69°16′35″N 143°47′51″W

Geography
- Location: North Slope Borough, Alaska, U.S.
- Parent range: Brooks Range
- Topo map: USGS Demarcation Point B-5

Mount Hubley is the second highest peak in the Brooks Range, Alaska, USA. Located in the eastern Brooks Range, in what are known as the Romanzof Mountains, Mount Hubley is 5 miles (8.0 km) north of Mount Isto, the tallest peak in the Brooks Range and its parent peak. Mount Hubley is within the Arctic National Wildlife Refuge and was named in 1958 for Dr. Richard Carleton Hubley, a coordinator for the International Geophysical Year who died in 1957 while doing research on the adjacent McCall Glacier. In 2014, new measurement technology established that Mount Hubley is the second highest peak in the Brooks Range after Mount Isto. Previously, Mount Chamberlin was believed to be the tallest, but it is now ranked third.
