= Chandalar, Alaska =

Unincorporated community in the state of Alaska, United States

- Unincorporated community
- Location within the state of Alaska
- Coordinates: 67°30′19″N 148°29′37″W
- Country: United States
- State: Alaska
- Census Area: Yukon-Koyukuk

Government
  - State senator: Donny Olson (D)
  - State rep.: Dean Westlake (D)
- Elevation: 1,873 ft (571 m)
- Time zone: UTC-9 (Alaska (AKST))
  - Summer (DST): UTC-8 (AKDT)
- Area code: 907

Chandalar is an unincorporated community in Yukon-Koyukuk Census Area in the U.S. state of Alaska.

Chandalar is located on the eastern shore of Chandalar Lake by Chandalar Lake Airport, about 200 miles north of Fairbanks, and is at an elevation of 1,873 feet. It succeeded an earlier community (or communities) by that name (see History). The present Chandalar has never formally reported a population on the U.S. Census.

The community is served by the Chandalar Lake Airport and is not accessible by road. It was featured in the National Geographic show Life Below Zero.

== Toponymy ==
Chandalar derives from a 19th-century French Slavey Jargon expression "Gens De Large", meaning nomadic people. The name was given by employees of the Hudson's Bay Company. Over time the word eventually evolved into its present-day namesake Chandalar.

== History, other Chandalars and Little Squaw ==
At least two communities bore the name of Chandalar before the present one. The Chandalar Mining Camp was located several miles to the northeast of the current Chandalar. 67°35′28″N 148°09′37″W This settlement was developed as a mining camp in about 1906–07, and a post office was established in 1908, but it was shut down in 1944.

Also at or adjacent to this location was the mining camp of Little Squaw, which was along the same named creek (now known as Crystal Creek.) Little Squaw had been named for the daughter of Frank & Nevelo Yasuda, who helped found this mining area. Little Squaw appeared twice on the U.S. Census, reporting a population of 8 in 1930 and 10 in 1940. In at least one instance, Little Squaw and Chandalar were reported as being the same place on the 1951 USGS Chandalar Topographical Map.

The present-day census-designated place of Venetie, Alaska was also called Chandalar Village. It is unclear if this was the "Chandalar" reported on the 1920 and 1930 U.S. Censuses. Maps of the time were not clear on the location, though the 1929 USGS Topographical Map of Chandalar-Sheenjek Region, Alaska reported Chandalar at the present location of Venetie. A review of the names on the census rolls for 1930 Chandalar and 1940 Venetie would confirm whether this was the same location.

The name was removed to the present settlement on Chandalar Lake by the airport around the 1940s.

== Climate ==
Chandalar has a continental subarctic climate (Köppen Dfc). The nearest weather station is at Chandalar Lake.

Climate data for Chandalar Lake, Alaska, 1991–2020 normals, extremes 1963–2011
Month	Jan	Feb	Mar	Apr	May	Jun	Jul	Aug	Sep	Oct	Nov	Dec	Year
Record high °F (°C)	38 (3)	38 (3)	50 (10)	54 (12)	83 (28)	87 (31)	92 (33)	90 (32)	78 (26)	59 (15)	42 (6)	31 (−1)	92 (33)
Mean maximum °F (°C)	24.9 (−3.9)	25.0 (−3.9)	30.3 (−0.9)	44.4 (6.9)	67.1 (19.5)	77.0 (25.0)	79.8 (26.6)	73.7 (23.2)	60.9 (16.1)	38.9 (3.8)	25.8 (−3.4)	22.8 (−5.1)	80.3 (26.8)
Mean daily maximum °F (°C)	−5.7 (−20.9)	1.4 (−17.0)	13.3 (−10.4)	31.6 (−0.2)	52.1 (11.2)	66.5 (19.2)	69.2 (20.7)	60.6 (15.9)	46.5 (8.1)	26.3 (−3.2)	6.7 (−14.1)	1.6 (−16.9)	30.8 (−0.6)
Daily mean °F (°C)	−15.8 (−26.6)	−9.9 (−23.3)	−0.9 (−18.3)	16.9 (−8.4)	39.5 (4.2)	53.8 (12.1)	56.7 (13.7)	48.6 (9.2)	35.8 (2.1)	16.6 (−8.6)	−4.0 (−20.0)	−8.2 (−22.3)	19.1 (−7.2)
Mean daily minimum °F (°C)	−25.9 (−32.2)	−21.2 (−29.6)	−15.1 (−26.2)	2.2 (−16.6)	26.8 (−2.9)	41.1 (5.1)	44.2 (6.8)	36.6 (2.6)	25.0 (−3.9)	6.8 (−14.0)	−14.8 (−26.0)	−17.9 (−27.7)	7.3 (−13.7)
Mean minimum °F (°C)	−52.5 (−46.9)	−51.5 (−46.4)	−43.4 (−41.9)	−27.5 (−33.1)	5.8 (−14.6)	27.0 (−2.8)	31.1 (−0.5)	21.1 (−6.1)	7.4 (−13.7)	−19.0 (−28.3)	−38.2 (−39.0)	−47.0 (−43.9)	−56.9 (−49.4)
Record low °F (°C)	−74 (−59)	−68 (−56)	−62 (−52)	−45 (−43)	−25 (−32)	20 (−7)	25 (−4)	11 (−12)	−8 (−22)	−44 (−42)	−57 (−49)	−63 (−53)	−74 (−59)
Average precipitation inches (mm)	0.43 (11)	0.25 (6.4)	0.34 (8.6)	0.20 (5.1)	0.58 (15)	1.20 (30)	1.32 (34)	1.53 (39)	0.99 (25)	0.57 (14)	0.35 (8.9)	0.57 (14)	8.33 (211)
Average snowfall inches (cm)	8.8 (22)	5.5 (14)	4.9 (12)	4.7 (12)	1.0 (2.5)	trace	0.0 (0.0)	trace	1.4 (3.6)	9.1 (23)	5.9 (15)	6.6 (17)	47.9 (121.1)
Average precipitation days (≥ 0.01 in)	6.3	4.8	4.9	4.3	5.1	9.2	10.9	10.6	9.2	8.9	6.3	6.2	86.7
Average snowy days (≥ 0.1 in)	6.8	5.3	5.2	4.0	1.3	0.0	0.0	0.0	1.3	8.8	6.3	7.1	46.1
Source 1: NOAA (precip/snow, precip days/snow days 1981-2010)
Source 2: WRCC (mean maxima and minima 1963-2011)

== Demographics ==
=== (Old) Chandalar ===
Historical population
Census	Pop.	Note	%±
1920	32		—
1930	62		93.8%
1940	0		−100.0%
U.S. Decennial Census

Chandalar first appeared on the 1920 U.S. Census and again in 1930 as an unincorporated village. It reported "no population" in 1940 and did not appear on the census again under that name. As stated under "history", it is unclear if this Chandalar is the former mining camp at Little Squaw Creek or if it was the present day Venetie.

=== New Chandalar ===
The new settlement that sprang up around the Chandalar Lake Airstrip has never formally reported a population to date, as of the 2010 Census. However it has a population of about 5.
