= Amatusuk Hills =

Mountaim range in Alaska, United States

Highest point
- Elevation: 1,358 ft (414 m)
- Coordinates: 69°3′39″N 163°19′17″W

Dimensions
- Length: 45 mi (72 km)

Geography
- State: Alaska
- Settlement: Kivalina

Amatusuk Hills is a mountain range in North Slope Borough, Alaska, in the United States. It is part of the Brooks Range.

Amatusuk is likely a name of Indigenous origin of unknown meaning.

== History ==
In 1838, Amatusuk Hills was noted in A.F. Kashevarov's Coastal Explorations in Northwest Alaska as "the last elevation of note that a coastal traveller heading north will see in northwest Alaska".

In 1920, Archdeacon Stuck published the name as 'Amahk-too-sook'. It has been variously spelled as: Amahtooscok Mountain, Amatosuk Hills, Amatusak Hills, and Amooktoosuk Hills.

The inland area is known for hunting, fishing, and fur trapping. The Inupiat residents of Point Lay used the rivers as navigational points, but only during bad weather. The Kukpowruk River is used as a reference point to the trapping regions when the coastal area is impassable during bad weather.
