= Hayes Volcano =

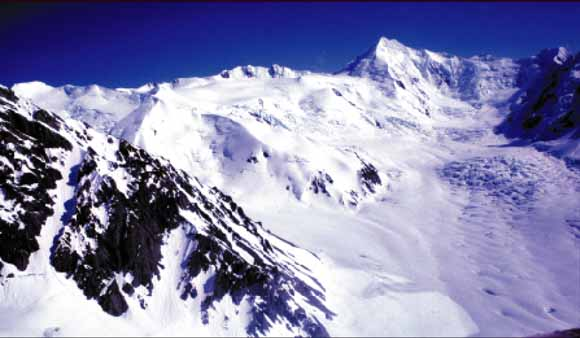
- Hayes Volcano, 1981

Highest point
- Elevation: 9,147 ft (2,788 m)
- Listing: List of volcanoes in the United States
- Coordinates: 61°38′25″N 152°24′41″W

Geography
- Location within Alaska
- Location: Matanuska-Susitna Borough, Alaska
- Parent range: Tordrillo Mountains
- Topo map: USGS Tyonek C-7

Geology
- Formed by: Subduction zone volcanism
- Mountain type: Stratovolcano
- Volcanic arc: Aleutian Arc
- Last eruption: 1200 ± 300 years

Hayes Volcano is a stratovolcano in southwestern Matanuska-Susitna Borough, Alaska, 135 km northwest of Anchorage, that was not discovered until 1975. It is responsible for a series of six major tephra layers in the Cook Inlet region of Alaska. Hayes was mostly destroyed by at least six catastrophic eruptions between 3,400 and 3,800 years ago, and the average volume of these eruptions was 2.4 cubic km. In comparison, the volume of the May 18, 1980 eruption of Mount St. Helens was about 1 cubic km. The eruptions of Hayes Volcano during that time were the most voluminous Holocene eruptions to have occurred in the Cook Inlet region. There is currently no fumarolic activity present. The last eruption of Hayes Volcano occurred roughly 1,200 years ago. It is named after the adjacent Hayes Glacier.

== Physical setting ==
Hayes Volcano is an ice-shrouded, glacially scoured eruptive center of Quaternary age composed of pyroclastic deposits, volcanic breccia, and lava domes. Although the edifice of the volcano is largely covered by glacier ice, parts of small lava domes, dome debris, and pyroclastic deposits project through the ice at altitudes of 2,400 to 2,800 meters above sea level. The volcano is nestled within the Tordrillo Mountains, a rugged, glacier-clad mountain range, between the Alaska Range and Cook Inlet, that is composed primarily of older plutonic igneous rocks. Most of the area is in high relief (greater than 1,500 meters) and supports an extensive complex of glacier ice that covers most of the mountainous terrain. The volume of perennial snow and glacier ice on Hayes Volcano is not known but is comparable to the ice volume present on Mount Spurr volcano (to the south), which supports about 67 km^{3} of ice and perennial snow.

Unlike the other volcanoes in the Cook Inlet area, Hayes Volcano lacks a well-defined cone, and deposits from eruptions older than the 4,400-to-3,600-year-old eruption are not known. The volcano is unusual in this regard because all other volcanoes in the Cook Inlet area consist of relatively voluminous assemblages of volcanic rock and debris that formed over many tens of thousands of years.

== Historical eruptions ==
Historical eruptions of Hayes Volcano are not known and evidence of recent eruptive activity is not apparent on the volcano. During trips to the volcano in 1999 and 2000, signs of volcanic unrest, such as melting of glacier ice, steaming, or discoloration of the ice surface by volcanic ash were not observed.
