= Limestack Mountain =

Mountain in Alaska, United States

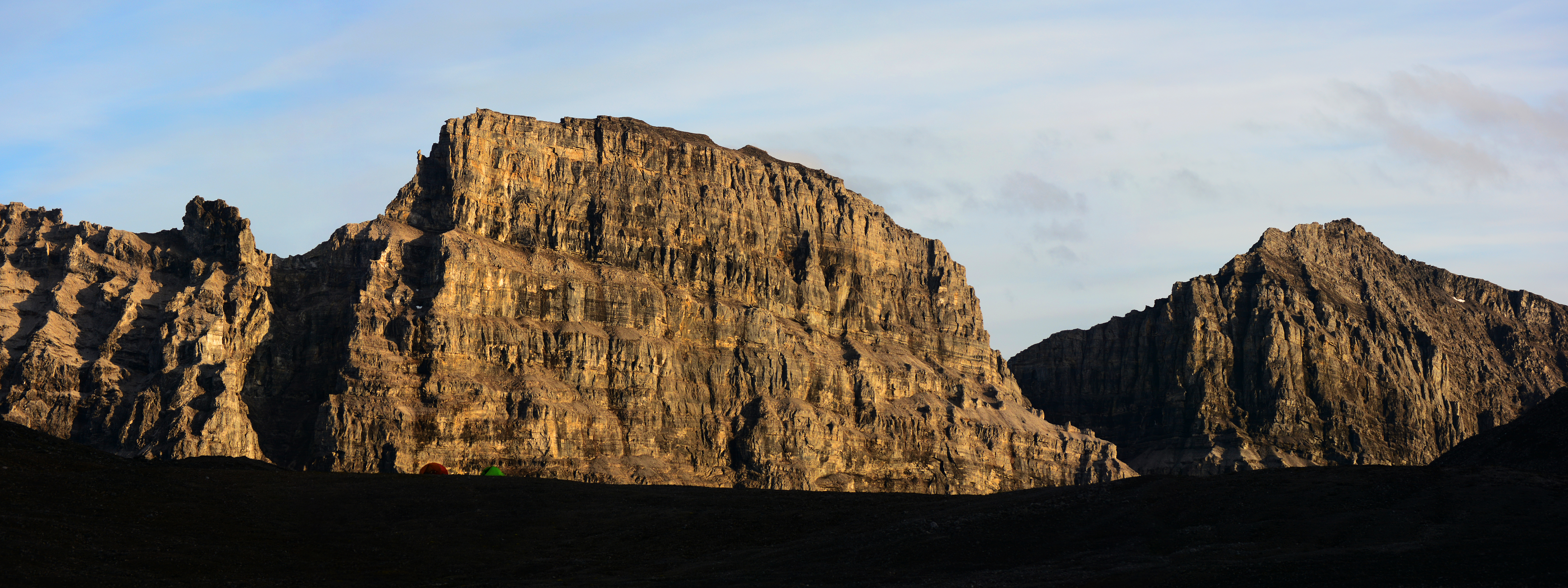
- Evening light illuminates the towering North face of Limestack Mountain. Both of these peaks are part of Limestack Mountain, with the true summit nearly a mile to the Southeast of the large face on the left.

Highest point
- Elevation: 6,250 ft (1,900 m)
- Coordinates: 68°5′59″N 150°46′39″W

Geography
- Location within Alaska
- Location: Gates of the Arctic National Park, Alaska, U.S.
- Parent range: Brooks Range

Climbing
- First ascent: Bob Marshall

Limestack Mountain is a 6,250-foot (1,905 m) mountain in the U.S. state of Alaska, located within Gates of the Arctic National Park in the central Brooks Range mountains. The continental divide between the Arctic Ocean and the Pacific Ocean runs along the mountain's northern edge.

== Naming and first ascent ==
Limestack Mountain was named by Bob Marshall, who was among the first European-Americans to explore and map the Brooks Range. In "Alaska Wilderness", Marshall describes his attempt to climb "one of the highest peaks on the Arctic Divide." After scrambling through boulders and steep scree, Marshall reached the top of a steep slope. "Above me rose the last thousand feet of my mountain, just a gray stack of limestone. So I called the peak Limestack Mountain." Marshall continued to the summit, making the first recorded ascent of the peak.

== Topography ==
The distinctive limestone cliffs of Limestack Mountain have been described as "Yosemite-like". Topographically, "Limestack Mountain" is the highest point in a group of rugged peaks covering ten or more square miles, linked by a series of long, steep ridges.
