= Cockedhat Mountain =

Mountain in Alaska, United States

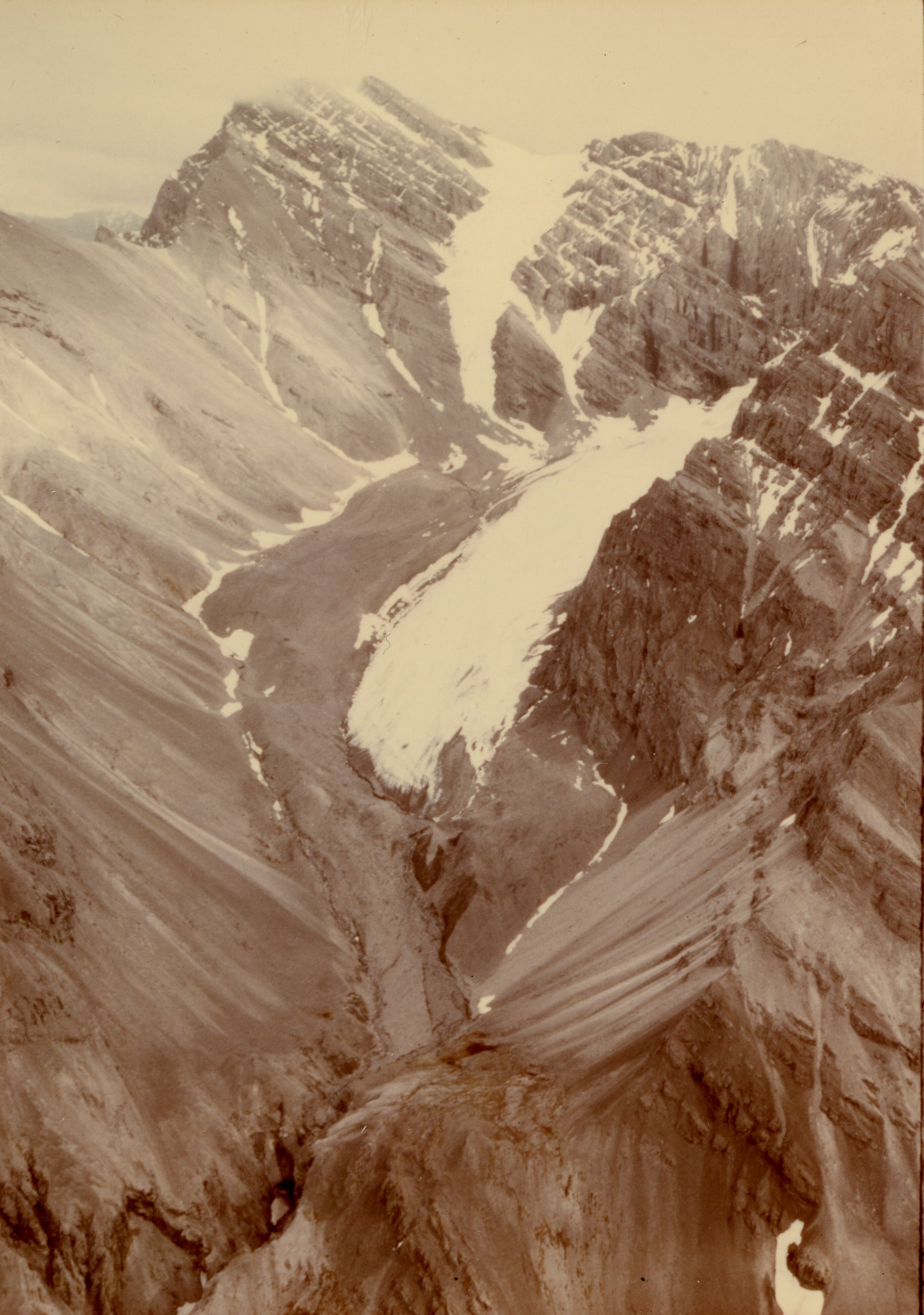
- Cockedhat Mountain, 1973

Highest point
- Elevation: 7,410 ft (2,260 m)
- Coordinates: 68°08′47″N 150°41′37″W

Geography
- Location within Alaska
- Location: Gates of the Arctic National Park and Preserve, Alaska, U.S.
- Parent range: Brooks Range

Cockedhat Mountain is a 7,410-foot (2,259 m) mountain in the U.S. state of Alaska, and is one of the tallest mountains in the central Brooks Range. Located in the midst of the protected wilderness of Gates of the Arctic National Park and Preserve, Cockedhat Mountain is approximately 27 air miles from the village of Anaktuvuk Pass, Alaska.

Cockedhat Mountain was so named on account of its unusual outline.

== Topography ==
Visitors to Cockedhat have remarked on its "high, jagged peaks wrapped in clouds," and its "vast, sheer mountain walls." The summit of Cockedhat Mountain rises at the intersection of four steep, long ridges. Cirque glaciers, rare in the central Brooks Range, sit in large bowls to the North, East, and West, and a small hanging glacier clings to the peak's steep western face. Only the peak's southern bowl remains free of year-round snow and ice.
