= Mount Chichantna =

Mountain summit in Alaska, United States

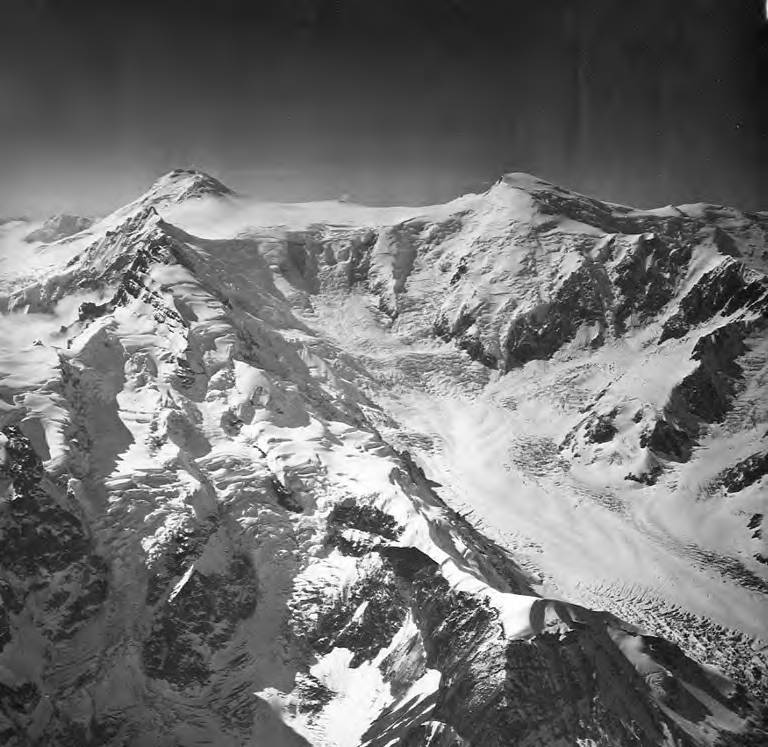
- Mount Spurr (L) and Mount Chichantna (R); Northeast aspect

Highest point
- Elevation: 10,893 ft (3,320 m)
- Prominence: 1,443 ft (440 m)
- Parent peak: Mount Spurr
- Isolation: 2.41 mi (3.88 km)
- Coordinates: 61°19′57″N 152°16′23″W

Geography
- Location within Alaska
- Interactive map of Mount Chichantna
- Country: United States
- State: Alaska
- Borough: Kenai Peninsula
- Parent range: Alaska Range; Tordrillo Mountains
- Topo map: USGS Tyonek B-7

Climbing
- Easiest route: Expedition climbing

Mount Chichantna is a 10,893-foot-elevation (3,320-meter) mountain summit in Alaska.

== Description ==
Mount Chichantna is located 80 miles (129 km) west of Anchorage in the Tordrillo Mountains which are a subrange of the Alaska Range. The remote glaciated peak ranks as the sixth-highest peak in the Tordrillo Mountains, and the 272nd-highest summit in Alaska. It is set 2.4 mi (4 km) north of Mount Spurr which is the nearest higher neighbor. Precipitation runoff from the peak's southwest slope drains to the Chakachatna River, whereas the other slopes drain to the Chichantna River. Topographic relief is significant as the east face rises nearly 5,900 feet (1,798 meters) in two miles (3.2 km). The mountain is named in association with the Chichantna River which originates from a glacier partly located on this peak. "Chichantna" is a Denaʼina word meaning "from-glacier stream." The mountain's toponym was officially adopted in 1999 by the United States Board on Geographic Names.

== Climate ==
Based on the Köppen climate classification, Mount Chichantna is located in a tundra climate zone with long, cold, snowy winters, and cool summers. Weather systems are forced upwards by the Alaska Range (orographic lift), causing heavy precipitation in the form of snowfall. Winter temperatures can drop below −10 °F with wind chill factors below −20 °F. This climate supports glaciers surrounding the peak including the Capps Glacier to the northeast. The months May through June offer the most favorable weather for viewing or climbing.

== Gallery ==
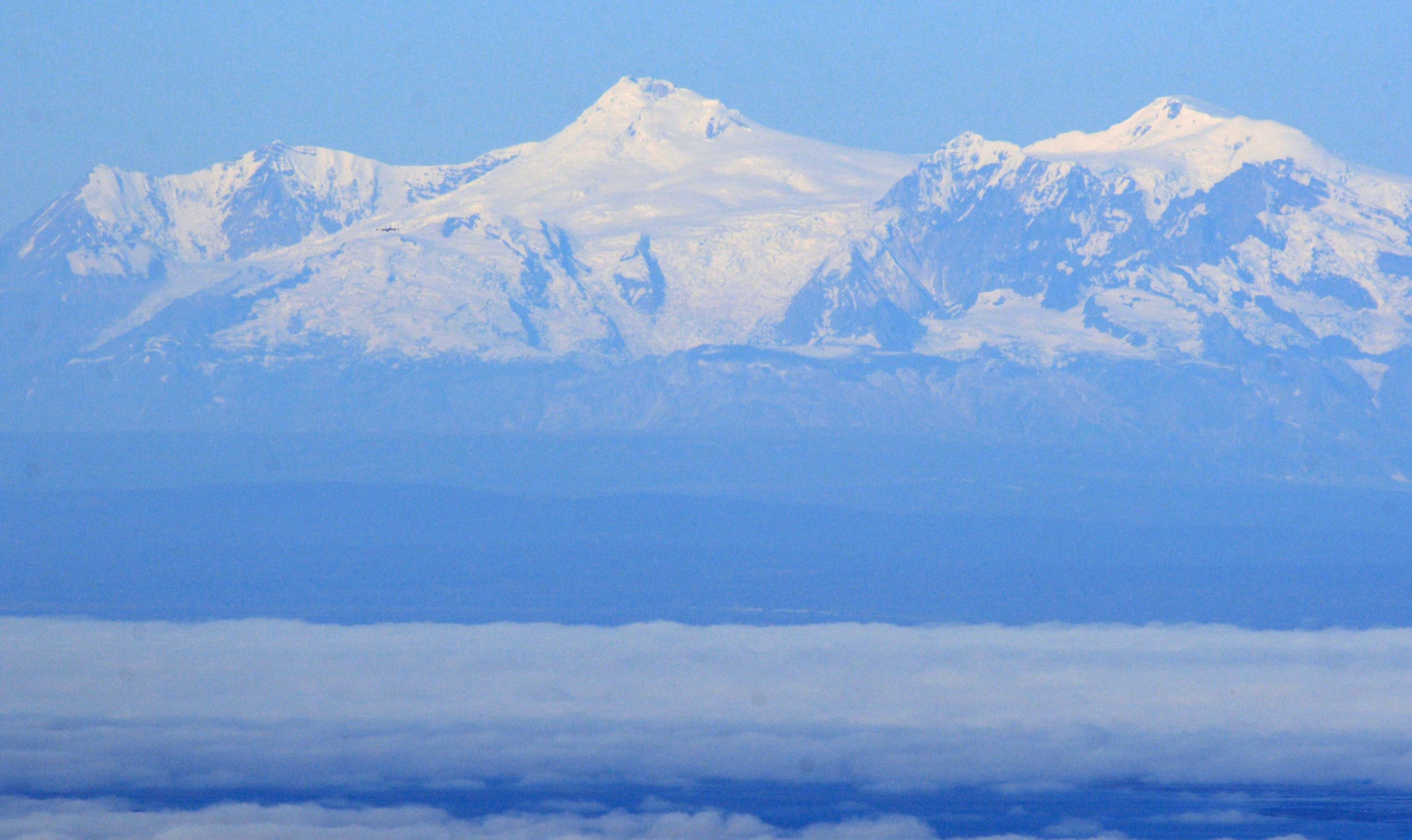
Mount Spurr (center) and Mount Chichantna (upper right) from east

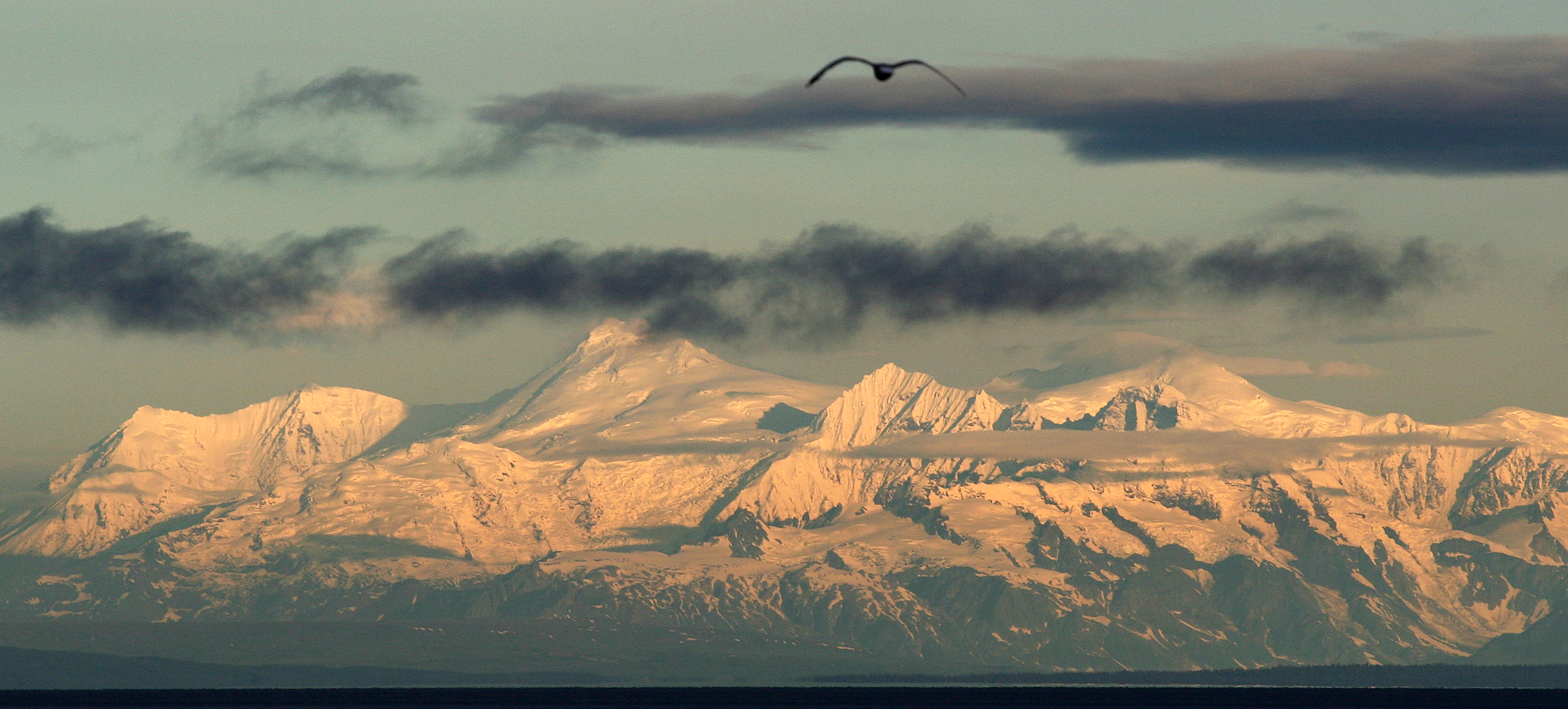
Mount Spurr, The Rowel, and Mount Chichantna from east at Anchorage

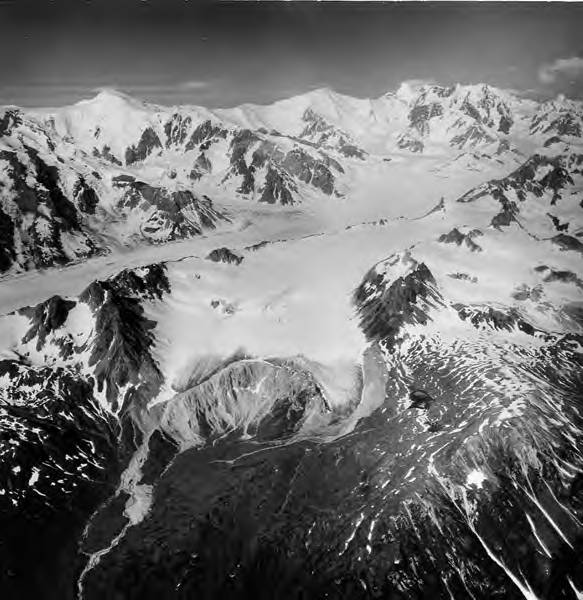
Mount Chichantna in upper left

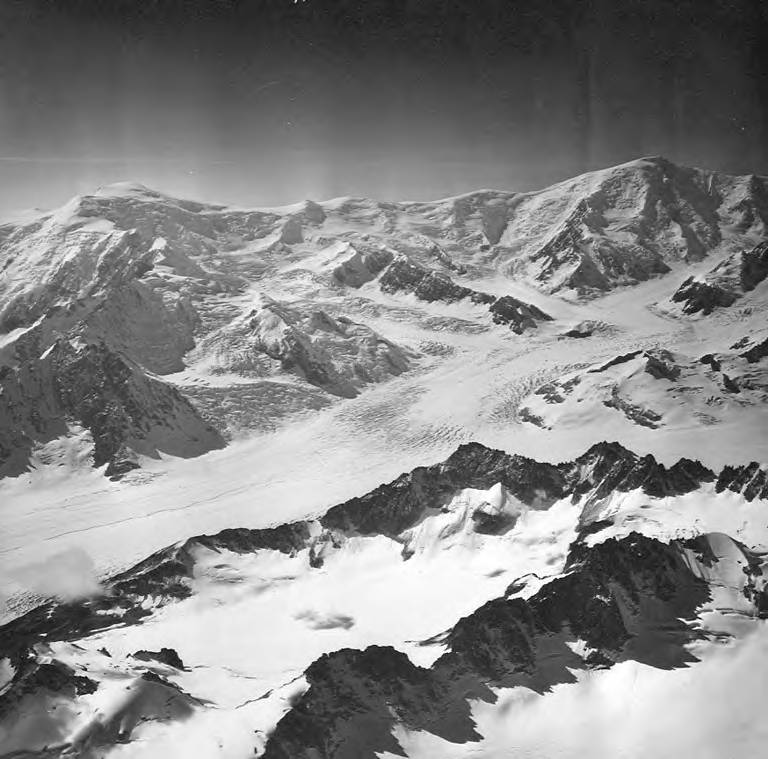
Chichantna (left) and Mount Nagishlamina (right)

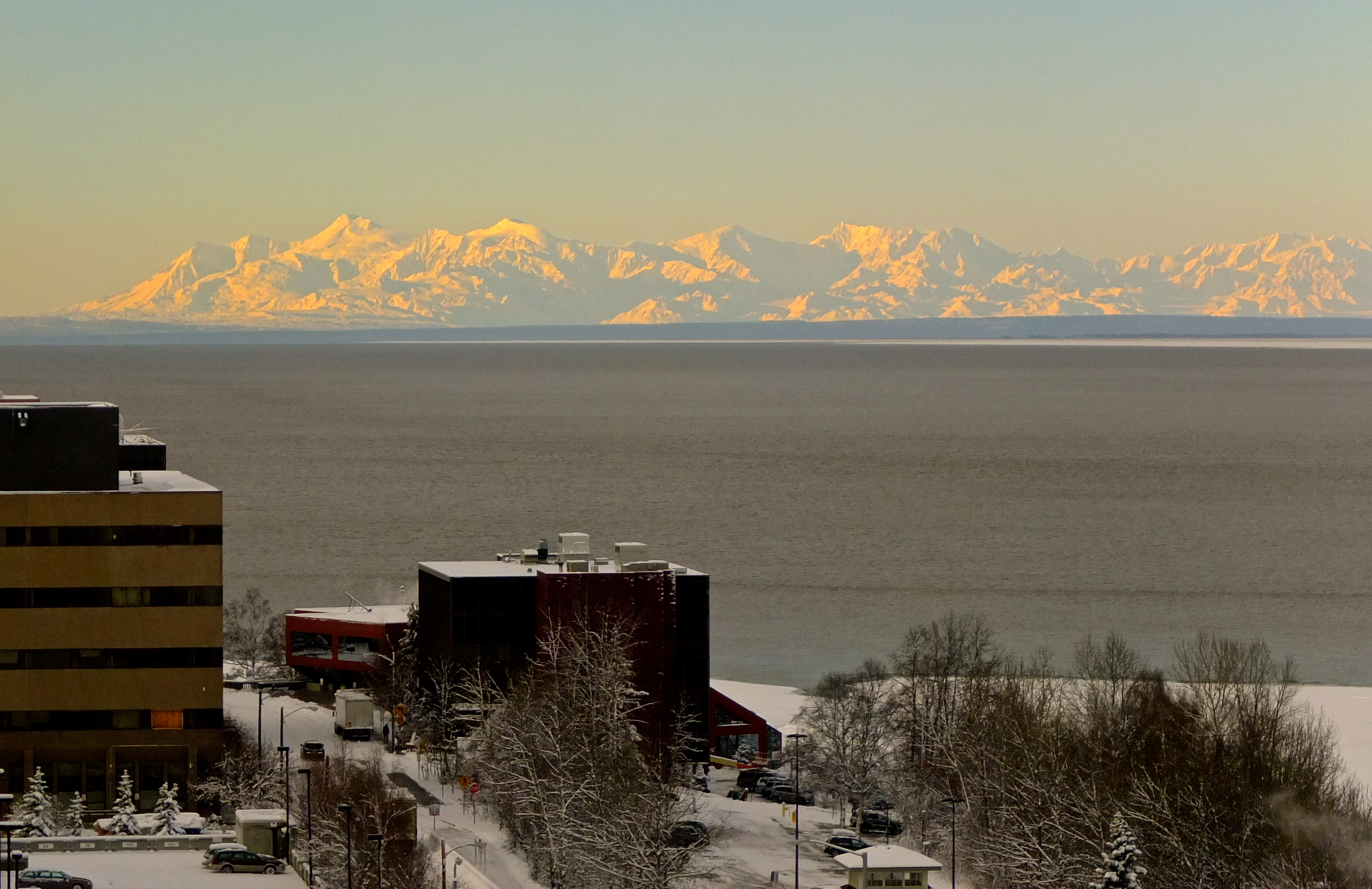
Chichantna (left of center - see file annotation)

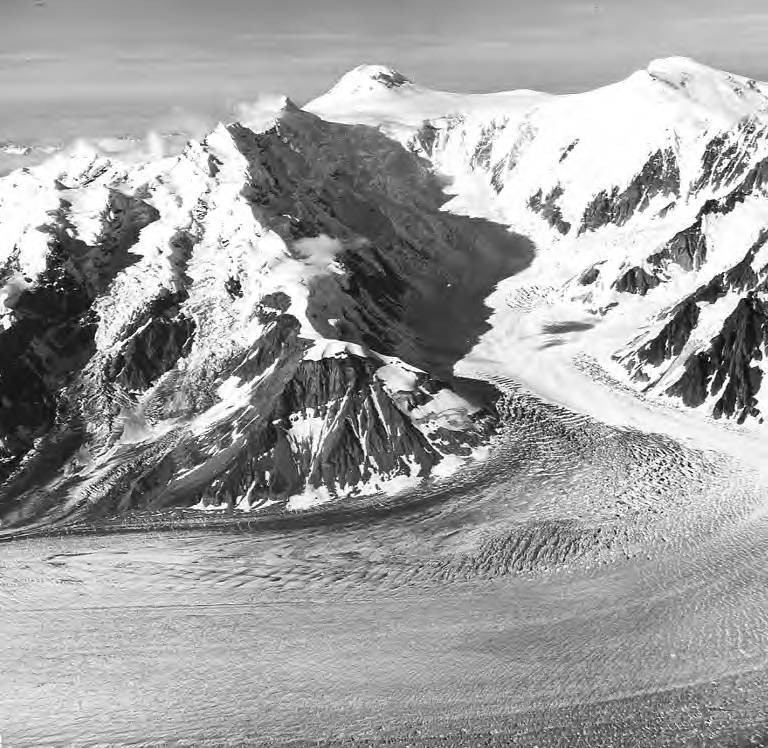
Chichantna (upper right corner), Spurr centered

== See also ==
- Mountain peaks of Alaska
- Geography of Alaska
