= Mount Chamberlin (Alaska) =

Mountain in Alaska, United States

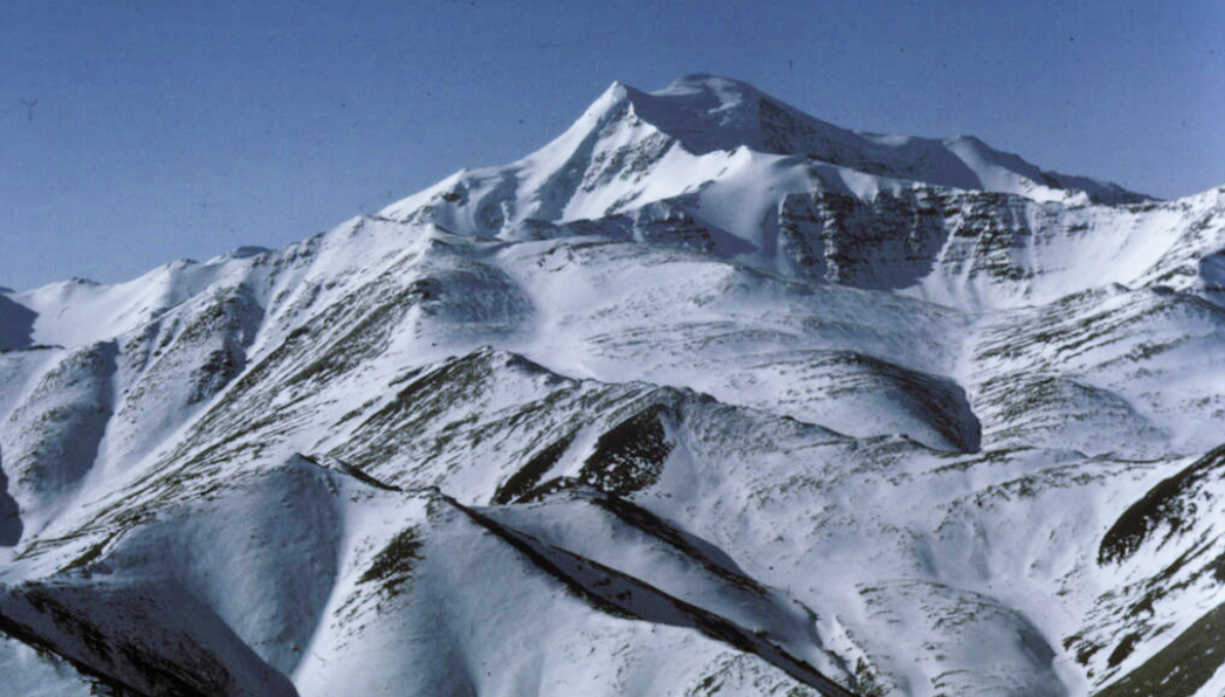

Highest point
- Elevation: 8,901 ft (2,713 m)
- Prominence: 4,101 ft (1,250 m)
- Listing: North America prominent peak 41st; North America isolated peaks 19th
- Coordinates: 69°16′38″N 144°54′32″W

Geography
- Location within Alaska
- Location: North Slope Borough, Alaska, U.S.
- Parent range: Brooks Range
- Topo map: USGS Mount Michelson B-2

Climbing
- First ascent: 1963 by George G. Barnes, Dennis Burge, Graham Stephenson
- Easiest route: West Ridge: glacier/snow climb, Alaska Grade 1; class 2 hike if route is ice-free

Mount Chamberlin is the third highest peak in the Brooks Range, Alaska, USA. Located in what are known as the Franklin Mountains of the Brooks Range, Mount Chamberlin is 30 miles (48 km) west-northwest of Mount Isto, the tallest peak in the Brooks Range. Mount Chamberlin is within the Arctic National Wildlife Refuge and was named for Thomas Chrowder Chamberlin (1843-1928), geologist of the Peary Auxiliary Expedition of 1894. Previously believed to be the highest peak in the Brooks Range, in 2014 new measurement technology established that Mount Chamberlin is the third highest peak in the range.
