= Brooks Range =

Mountain range in Alaska, United States

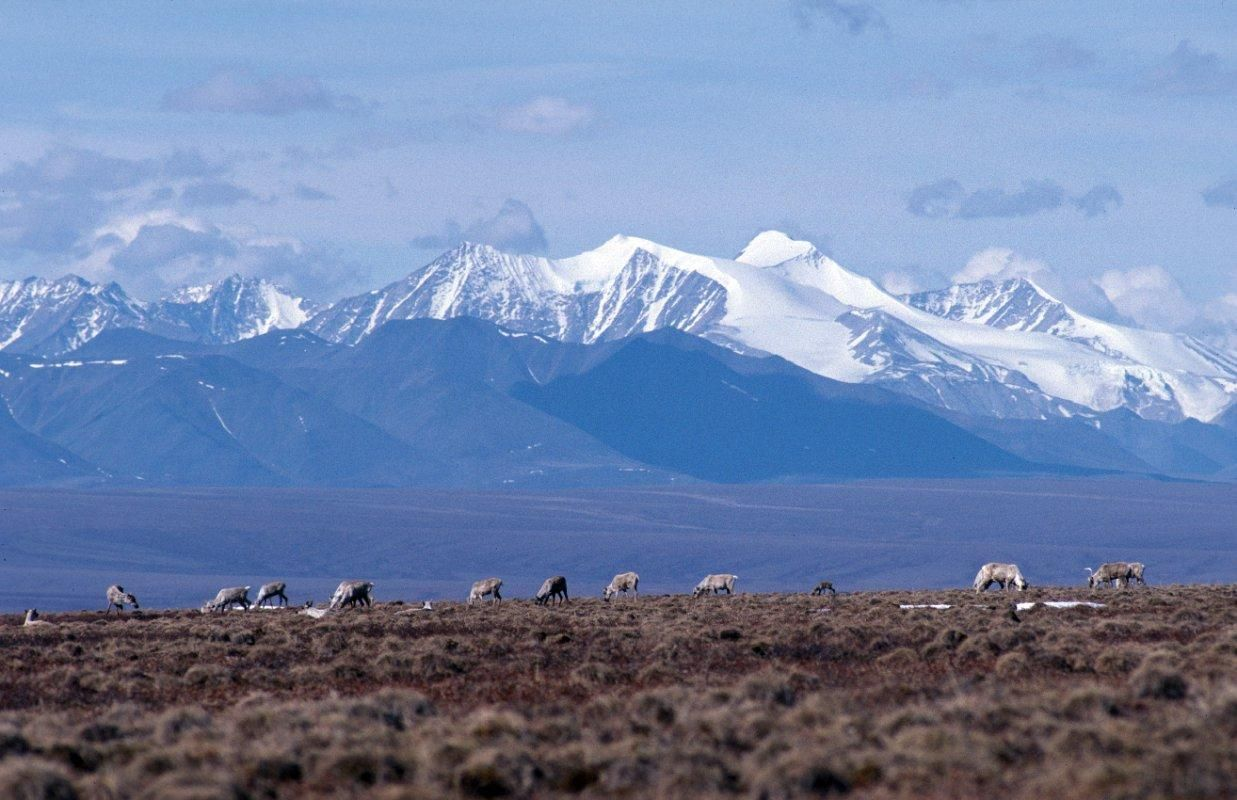
- Brooks Range from the Arctic National Wildlife Refuge

Highest point
- Peak: Mount Isto
- Elevation: 8,976 ft (2,736 m)
- Coordinates: 69°12′09″N 143°48′08″W

Dimensions
- Length: 700 mi (1,100 km) East-west
- Width: 150 mi (240 km) North-south

Naming
- Native name: Gwazhal (Gwichʼin)

Geography
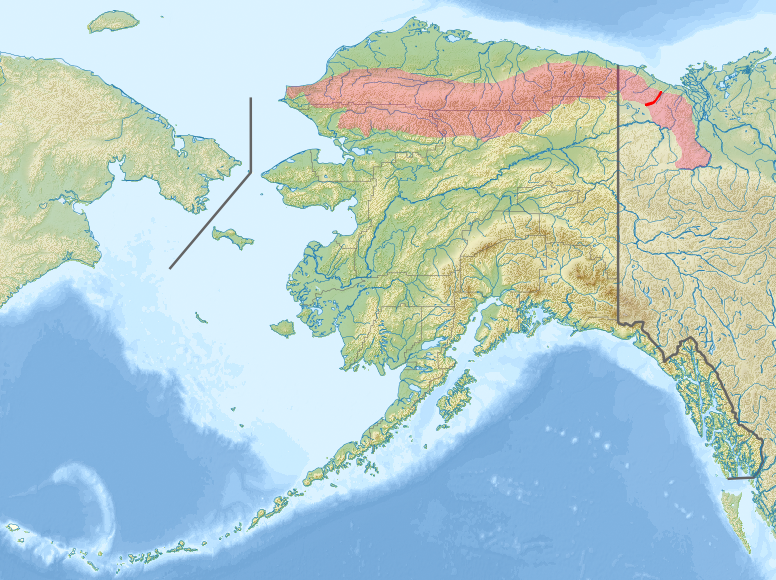
- Countries: United States; Canada
- State/Territory: Alaska; Yukon
- Range coordinates: 68°12′N 152°15′W

Geology
- Orogeny: Laramide
- Rock age: Cretaceous

The Brooks Range (Gwich'in: Gwazhał) is a mountain range in far northern North America stretching some 700 miles (1,100 km) from west to east across northern Alaska into Canada's Yukon Territory. Reaching a peak elevation of 8,976 feet (2,736 m) on Mount Isto, the range is believed to be approximately 126 million years old.

In the United States, these mountains are considered a subrange of the Rocky Mountains, whereas in Canada they are considered separate, as the northern border of the Rocky Mountains is considered to be the Liard River far to the south in the province of British Columbia.

While the range is mostly uninhabited, the Dalton Highway and Trans-Alaska Pipeline System run through the Atigun Pass (1,415 m, 4,643 ft) on their way to the oil fields at Prudhoe Bay on Alaska's North Slope. The Alaska Native villages of Anaktuvuk and Arctic Village, as well as the very small communities of Coldfoot, Wiseman, Bettles, and Chandalar, are the range's only settlements. In the far west, near the Wulik River in the De Long Mountains is the Red Dog mine, the largest zinc mine in the world.

In America, the range is federally protected as a series of national wildernesses and refuges, including Gates of the Arctic National Park, Arctic National Wildlife Refuge, and Noatak National Preserve.

The range was named by the United States Board on Geographic Names in 1925 after Alfred Hulse Brooks, chief USGS geologist for Alaska from 1903 to 1924.

Various historical records also referred to the range as the Arctic Mountains, Hooper Mountains, Meade Mountains and Meade River Mountains. The Canadian portion of the range is officially called the British Mountains. Ivvavik National Park is located in Canada's British Mountains.

== Peaks ==
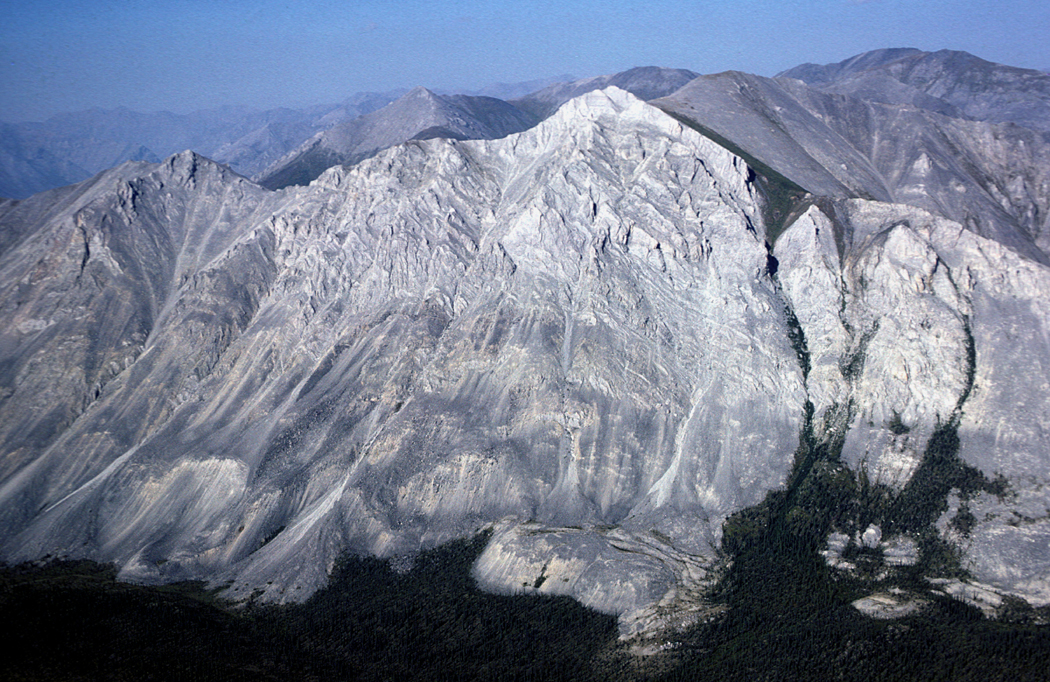
Brooks Range Mountains

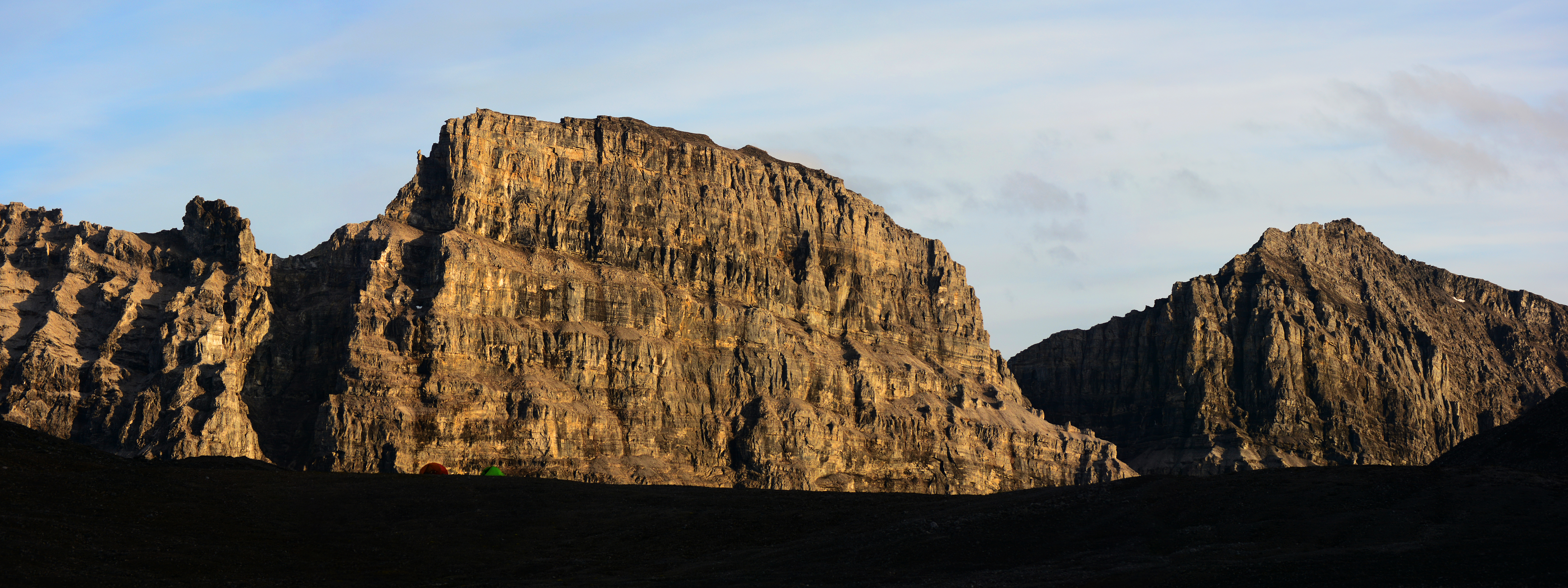
Limestack Mountain, in the central Brooks Range

- Mount Isto 8,975.1 ft (2,735.6 m)
- Mount Hubley 8,914 ft (2,717 m)
- Mount Chamberlin 8,898.6 ft (2,712.3 m)
- Mount Michelson at 8,855 ft (2,699 m)
- The Gates of Kiev at 7,775 ft (2,370 m), the highest point in the central part of the range
- Black Mountain at 5,020 ft (1,530 m), the highest point in the far western part of the range.
- Mount Doonerak 7,457 ft (2,273 m)
- Mount Igikpak 8,276 ft (2,523 m)
- Frigid Crags West Gate 5,501 ft (1,677 m)
- Boreal Mountain East Gate 6,654 ft (2,028 m)
- Limestack Mountain 6,250 ft (1,900 m)
- Cockedhat Mountain 7,410 ft (2,260 m)

== History ==
Bob Marshall explored the North Fork Koyukuk River area of the range in 1929. He named Mount Doonerak, explaining "the name Doonerak I took from an Eskimo word which means a spirit or, as they would translate it, a devil." Marshall described the mountain as, a "towering, black, unscalable-looking giant, the highest peak in this section of the Brooks Range."

== Ecology ==
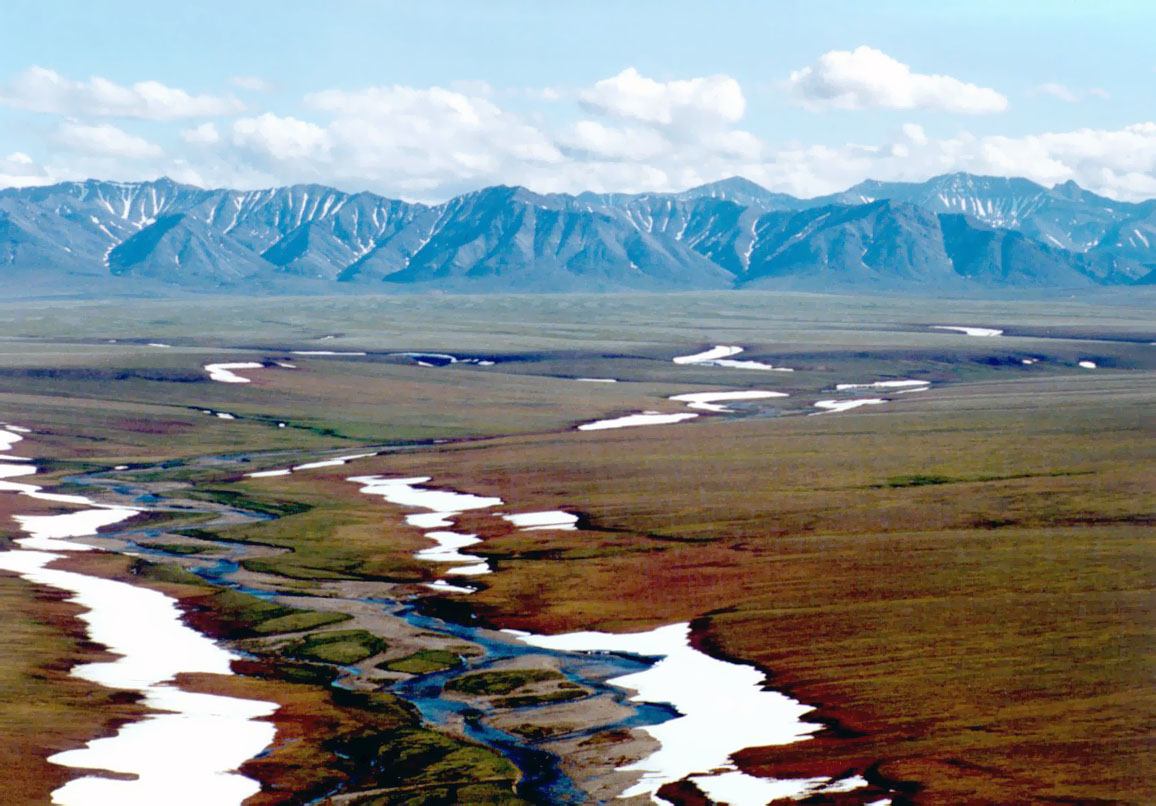
Area of the Arctic National Wildlife Refuge coastal plain, looking south toward the Brooks Range

The Brooks Range forms the northernmost drainage divide in North America, separating streams flowing into the Arctic Ocean and the North Pacific. The range roughly delineates the summer position of the Arctic front. It represents the northern extent of the tree line, with little beyond isolated balsam poplar stands occurring north of the continental drainage divide. Trembling aspen and white spruce also occur north of the Brooks Range, though they are limited to sites that have been disturbed by human activity. Southern slopes have some cover of black spruce, Picea mariana, marking the northern limit of those trees. As the global mean temperature increases, tree line has been observed to move further north, changing the boundaries of where these trees are found. An increase in shrub abundance is also being experienced in areas which were previously dominated by tundra, impacting the ecology of the area.

As one of the most remote and least-disturbed wildernesses of North America, the mountains are home to Dall sheep, grizzly bears, black bear, gray wolf, moose and porcupine caribou.

In Alaska, the Western Arctic Caribou herd (490,000 strong in 2004) traverses the Brooks Range in its annual migration. The smaller Central Arctic herd (32,000 in 2002), as well as the 123,000 animal Porcupine Caribou herd, likewise migrate through the Brooks range on their annual journeys in and out of the Arctic National Wildlife Refuge. The migration path of the Porcupine Caribou herd is the longest of any terrestrial mammal on earth.

== Paleontology ==
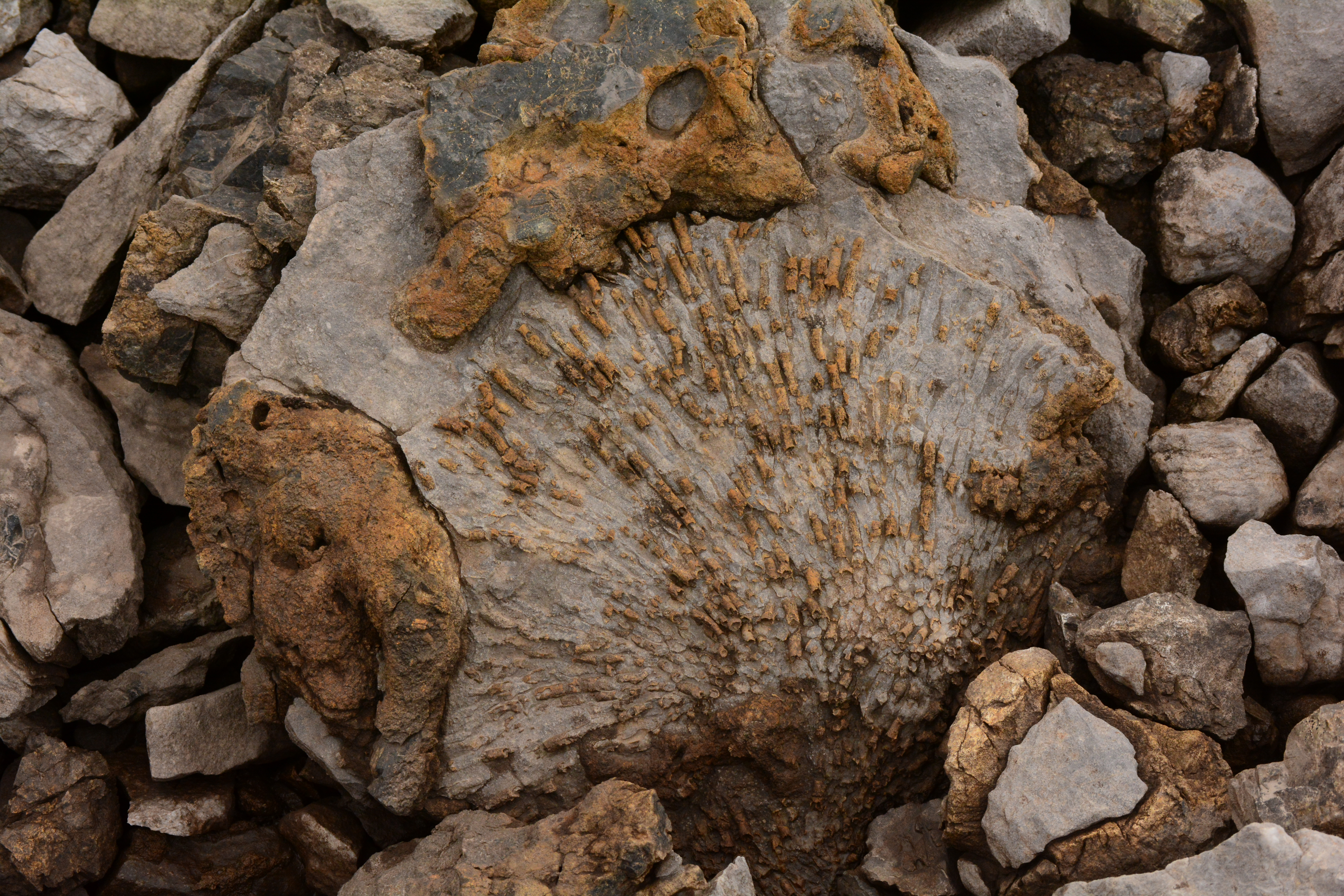
Fossilized corals in the Brooks Range, near Limestack Mountain

Because the rocks of the range were formed in an ancient seabed, the Brooks Range contains fossils of marine organisms. In addition to the coral fossils shown, trilobites and brachiopods from the middle Cambrian have been found in the sandy limestones of the Central Brooks Range.

During the middle of the Cretaceous, the Brooks Range thrust belt underwent significant regional extension.

Remains of a woolly mammoth that died about 17,100 years ago were found north of the Brooks Range. A research report on its movement range was published in 2021.

== Climate ==
While other Alaskan ranges to the south and closer to the coast can receive 250 inches (640 cm) to 500 inches (1,300 cm) of snow, the average snow precipitation on the Brooks Range is reported at 30 inches (76 cm) to 51 inches (130 cm). Due to a changing climate, between the years 1969–2018 the Eastern and Western portions of the Brooks Range have experienced a 17.2% increase in annual precipitation.

As measured at the Anaktuvuk Pass weather station (elevation 770 metres (2,530 ft)), the average summer temperatures are 16 °C (61 °F) as a high and 3 °C (37 °F) as a low. During the winter the average high is −22 °C (−8 °F) while the average low is −30 °C (−22 °F). Polar amplification is a force experienced in this region as global temperatures are rising. The northern and western regions of Alaska, where the Brooks Range lies, is experiencing a warming rate twice that of southeastern Alaska. The Brooks Range has experienced an increase in average summer temperature between 4.2 °F and 5.8 °F between the years 1969–2018.

In certain areas of the Brooks Range, year round snow cover or "perennial snowfields", can be found. In 1985, 34 square miles of snowfields were recorded, where as that number has dropped to under four square miles in 2017.

== Films ==
- 2007 - Gates of the Arctic: Alaska's Brooks Range
- 2008 - Alone Across Alaska: 1,000 Miles of Wilderness
- 2011 - The Edge of the Earth (short film)
- 2014 - The World Beyond the World (short film)

== See also ==
- Amatusuk Hills
- Philip Smith Mountains
- Richardson Mountains
