= Tordrillo Mountains =

Mountain range in Alaska, U.S.

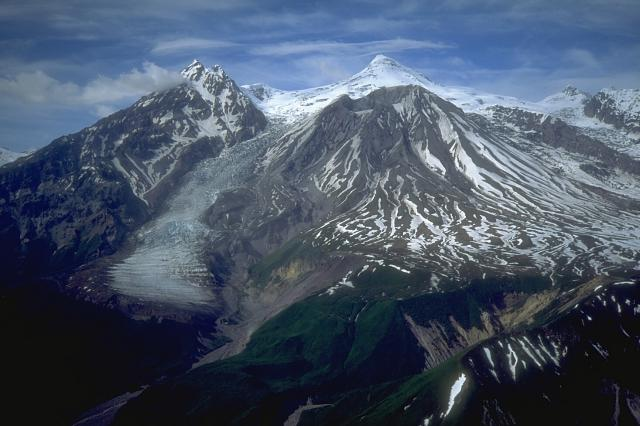
- Mount Spurr from the south

Highest point
- Peak: Mount Torbert
- Elevation: 11,413 ft (3,479 m)
- Coordinates: 61°24′32″N 152°24′50″W

Dimensions
- Length: 35 mi (56 km)
- Width: 60 mi (97 km)

Geography
- Country: United States
- State: Alaska
- Borders on: Chigmit Mountains and Alaska Range

The Tordrillo Mountains are a small mountain range in the Matanuska-Susitna and Kenai Peninsula Boroughs in the southcentral region of the U.S. state of Alaska. They lie approximately 75 miles (121 km) west-northwest of Anchorage. The range extends approximately 60 miles (97 km) north-south and 35 miles (56 km) east-west. The highest point is Mount Torbert (11,413 feet/3,479 m). On a clear day, they are easily visible from Anchorage.

The Tordrillos are bordered on the south by the Chigmit Mountains, the northernmost extension of the Aleutian Range. (The Tordrillos are sometimes counted as part of the Aleutian Range, but this is not official usage.) On the west and north they meet the southern tip of the Revelation Mountains, part of the Alaska Range, while on the east they fade into the hills and lowlands of southcentral Alaska. The north side of the range feeds the Skwentna River, and the south drains into Chakachamna Lake and the Chakachatna River.

The Tordrillos are primarily a volcanic range, like most of the neighboring Aleutian Range; however some of the peaks (for example, Mount Torbert) are not volcanoes. Mount Spurr, the southernmost peak in the range, had its most recent eruption in June 1992. They are heavily glaciated, partly due to their location near Cook Inlet. Major glaciers include the Capps Glacier, Triumvirate Glacier, Hayes Glacier, and Trimble Glacier.

Despite their proximity to Anchorage, the Tordrillos see little recreational or climbing activity. However, Mount Spurr and nearby Crater Peak are regularly visited and monitored by the Alaska Volcano Observatory.

== Named peaks of the Tordrillo Mountains ==
- Mount Torbert (11,413 feet/3,479 m)
- Mount Gerdine (11,258 feet/3,431 m)
- Mount Talachulitna (11,150 feet/3,399m)
- Mount Spurr (11,070 feet/3,370 m)
- Mount Nagishlamina (11,068 feet/3,374 m)
- Mount Chichantna (10,893 ft/3,320 m)
- Hayes Volcano (9,147 feet/2,788 m)
- Crater Peak (7,575 feet/2,309 m) (A subsidiary peak of Mount Spurr)

== Gallery ==
Aerial (helicopter) video of Trimble Glacier

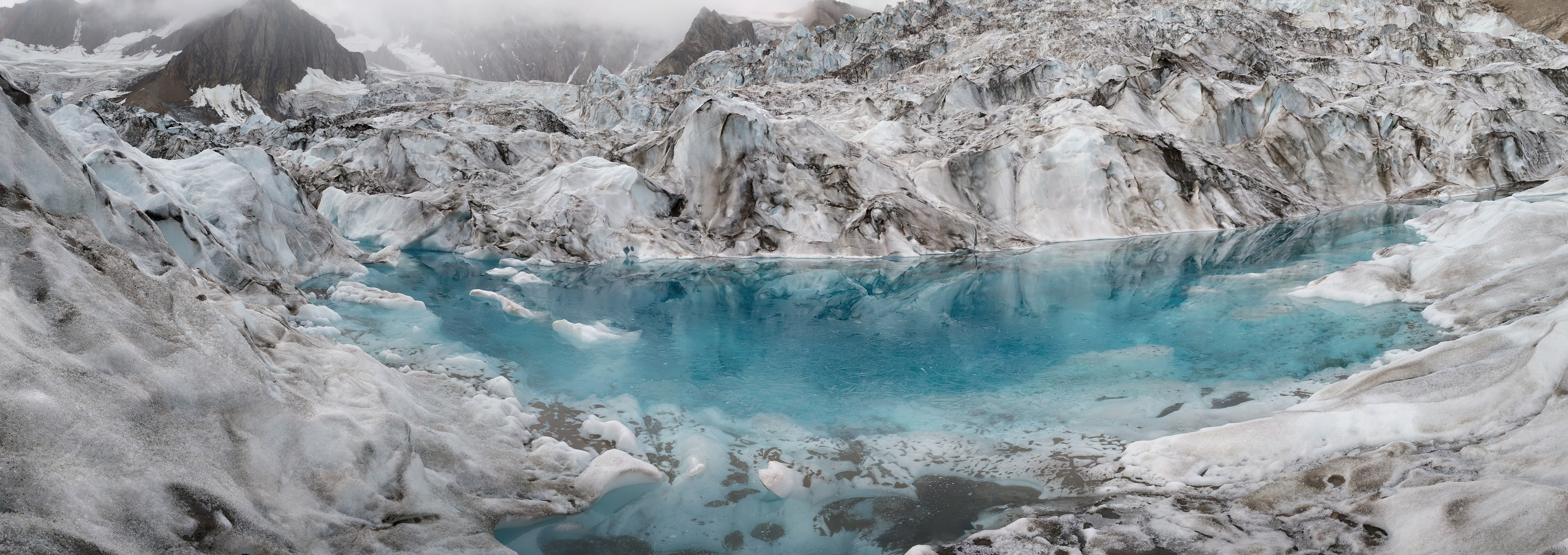
Panorama of an ice lake in Trimble Glacier
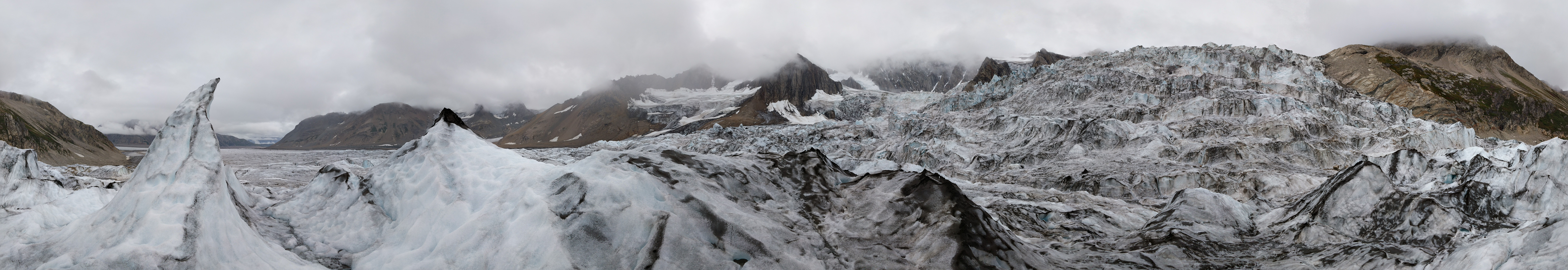
Panorama of Trimble Glacier
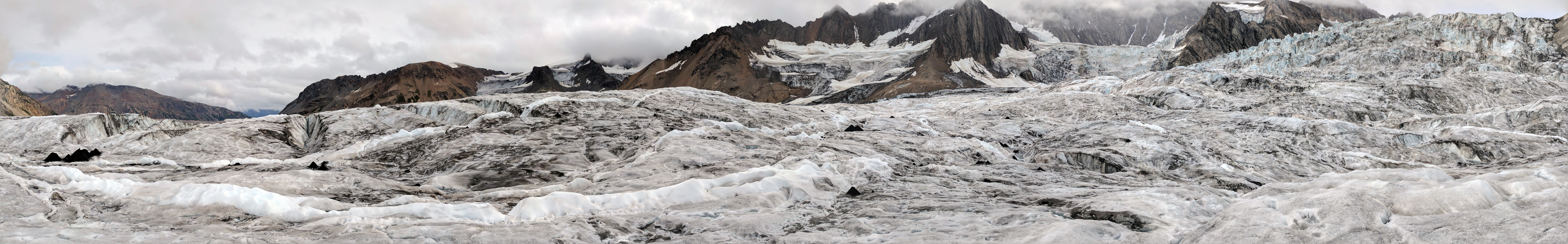
Panorama of Trimble Glacier
