= Chandalar Lake =

Lake in United States of America

- Location within Alaska Location within North America
- Location: Alaska
- Coordinates: 67°30′27″N 148°30′45″W
- Basin countries: United States

Chandalar Lake is a lake in Yukon-Koyukuk Census Area, Alaska, United States. The lake is approximately 9.5 mi (15.3 km) in length.
