= Mount Isto =

Mountain in Alaska, US

- Location within Alaska

Highest point
- Elevation: 8,976 ft (2,736 m)
- Prominence: 7,876 ft (2,401 m)
- Coordinates: 69°12′09″N 143°48′08″W

Geography
- Location: North Slope Borough, Alaska, U.S.
- Parent range: Brooks Range
- Topo map: USGS Demarcation Point B-5

Mount Isto is the highest peak in the Brooks Range, Alaska, USA. Located in the eastern Brooks Range, in what are known as the Romanzof Mountains, Mount Isto is 5 miles (8.0 km) south of Mount Hubley, the second tallest peak in the Brooks Range. Mount Isto is within the Arctic National Wildlife Refuge and was named in 1966 for Reynold E. (Pete) Isto, a civil engineer for the U.S. Geological Survey. In 2014, new measurement technology established that Mount Isto is the highest peak in the Brooks Range. Previously, Mount Chamberlin was believed to be the tallest, but it is now ranked third.

== See also ==
- List of mountain peaks of North America
  - List of mountain peaks of the United States
    - List of mountain peaks of Alaska
- List of Ultras of the United States
