= Chakachatna River =

River in Alaska, United States

- Location of the mouth of the Chakachatna River in Alaska

Location
- Country: United States
- State: Alaska
- Borough: Kenai Peninsula

Physical characteristics
- Source: Chakachamna Lake
  - location: Neacola and Tordrillo mountains
  - coordinates: 61°12′56″N 152°22′37″W
  - elevation: 1,143 ft (348 m)
- Mouth: McArthur River
  - location: 3 miles (5 km) north of Trading Bay, Cook Inlet
  - coordinates: 60°56′36″N 151°44′43″W
  - elevation: 0 ft (0 m)
- Length: 36 mi (58 km)

The Chakachatna River (Dena'ina Athabaskan Ch'akajatnu) is a stream, 36 miles (58 km) long, in northwestern Kenai Peninsula Borough in the U.S. state of Alaska. It flows from Chakachamna Lake southeastward into the McArthur River, which flows into the Gompertz Channel of Cook Inlet. The river mouth is about 3 miles (5 km) north of Trading Bay and 32 miles (51 km) northwest of Kenai.

Draining parts of the Alaska Range that lie within Lake Clark National Park and Preserve, the Chakachatna and McArthur rivers and their tributaries originate mainly on glaciers. Heavy silt loads limit sportfishing to small clear-water tributaries such as the Chakachatna's Straight Creek. The main game fish on these streams are Chinook, Coho, and sockeye salmon.

== See also ==
- List of rivers of Alaska
