= Mount Torbert =

Mountain in the United States of America

- Location within Alaska

Highest point
- Elevation: 11,413 ft (3,479 m)
- Prominence: 8,688 ft (2,648 m)
- Isolation: 157.25 km (97.71 mi)
- Listing: North America prominent peaks 30th; Ultra
- Coordinates: 61°24′32″N 152°24′50″W

Geography
- Location: Kenai Peninsula Borough, Alaska, U.S.
- Parent range: Tordrillo Mountains

Climbing
- Easiest route: glacier/snow climb

Mount Torbert is the highest point of the Tordrillo Mountains, a small, primarily volcanic range, northwest of Anchorage, Alaska. It is a heavily glaciated peak.

While Mount Torbert is not itself a volcano, although nearby Mount Spurr and Crater Peak are active volcanoes.

== See also ==
- List of mountain peaks of North America
  - List of mountain peaks of the United States
    - List of mountain peaks of Alaska
- List of Ultras of the United States

== Sources ==
- Alaska Ultra-Prominence Page
- Alaska Volcano Observatory
