= Mount Spurr =

Volcano in southern Alaska, USA

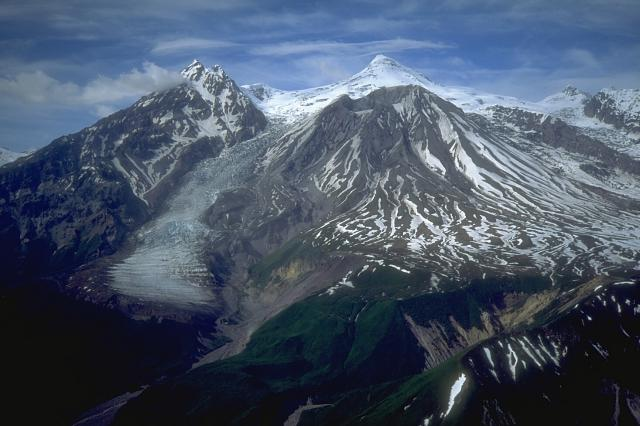
- Mount Spurr from the south

Highest point
- Elevation: 11,070 ft (3,370 m)
- Prominence: 585 m (1,919 ft)
- Parent peak: Mount Torbert
- Listing: Mountains of Alaska
- Coordinates: 61°17′59″N 152°15′05″W

Naming
- Native name: K'idazq'eni (Denaʼina)

Geography
- Location within Alaska
- Interactive map of Mount Spurr
- Location: Kenai Peninsula Borough, Alaska, United States
- Parent range: Tordrillo Mountains, Alaska Range
- Topo map: USGS Tyonek B-7

Geology
- Formed by: Subduction zone volcanism
- Rock age: < 10,000 years
- Mountain type: Stratovolcano
- Volcanic arc: Aleutian Arc
- Last eruption: June to September 1992

Climbing
- First ascent: 1960

Mount Spurr (Dena'ina: K'idazq'eni) is a stratovolcano in the Aleutian Arc of Alaska, named after United States Geological Survey geologist and explorer Josiah Edward Spurr, who led an expedition to the area in 1898. The Alaska Volcano Observatory (AVO) rates Mount Spurr as Level of Concern Color Code Yellow. The mountain is known aboriginally by the Dena'ina Athabascan name K'idazq'eni, literally 'that which is burning inside'.

Mount Spurr, the highest volcano of the Aleutian Arc, is a large stratocone at the center of a roughly 5-kilometer-wide (3.1 mi) horseshoe-shaped caldera that is open to the south. The volcano lies 81 miles (130 km) west of Anchorage and northeast of Chakachamna Lake. The caldera was formed by a late-Pleistocene or early Holocene sector collapse and associated pyroclastic flows that destroyed an ancestral Spurr volcano. The debris avalanche traveled more than 15.5 miles (24.9 km) to the southeast, and the resulting deposit contains blocks as large as 100 meters (330 ft) in diameter. Several ice-carved post-caldera domes lie in the caldera. Mount Spurr is the highest of the post-caldera. The regrown summit peak of Spurr experienced a heating event in 2004 which created a small crater lake. By 2008, the summit crater had cooled enough to have begun to have accumulated significant amounts of snow again. The youngest post-caldera dome, Crater Peak (2,309 meters, 7,575 ft), formed at the breached southern end of the caldera about 3.2 kilometers (2.0 mi) south of Spurr, has been the source of about 40 identified Holocene tephra layers. Spurr's two historical eruptions, from Crater Peak in 1953 and 1992, deposited ash on the city of Anchorage. Crater Peak has a summit crater that is itself slightly breached along the south rim; the north wall of the crater exposes the truncated remains of an older dome or lava lake. Before the 1992 eruption, a small crater lake occupied the bottom of Crater Peak's crater.

As with other Alaskan volcanoes, the proximity of Spurr to major trans-Pacific aviation routes means that an eruption of this volcano could significantly disrupt air travel. Volcanic ash can cause jet engines to fail.

== Recent activity ==
On July 26, 2004, the AVO raised the "Color Concern Code" at Spurr from green to yellow due to an increasing number of earthquakes. Earthquakes beneath a volcano may indicate the movement of magma preceding a volcanic eruption, but the earthquakes might also die out without an eruption. In the first week of August 2004, the AVO reported the presence of a collapse pit, filled with water forming a new crater lake, in the ice and snow cover on the summit. This lake may have been caused by an increase in heat flow through the summit lava dome.

On May 3, 2005, a debris flow was observed in webcam images, as well as by a nearby pilot. A subsequent overflight revealed that much of the sitting pond within the melt hole had drained away, leaving a cauldron, and the color of concern was lowered back to green on February 21, 2006.

The alert level for Mount Spurr was again raised to yellow (advisory) on October 23, 2024, due to an increase in seismic activity.

== Gallery ==
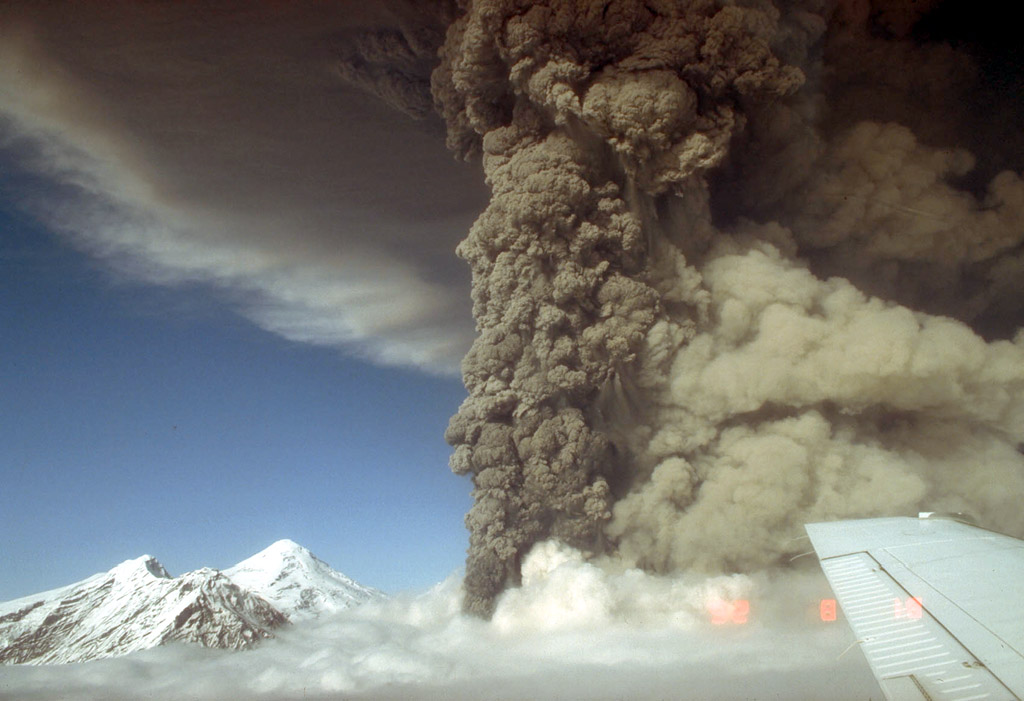
Eruption column from Crater Peak vent in 1992

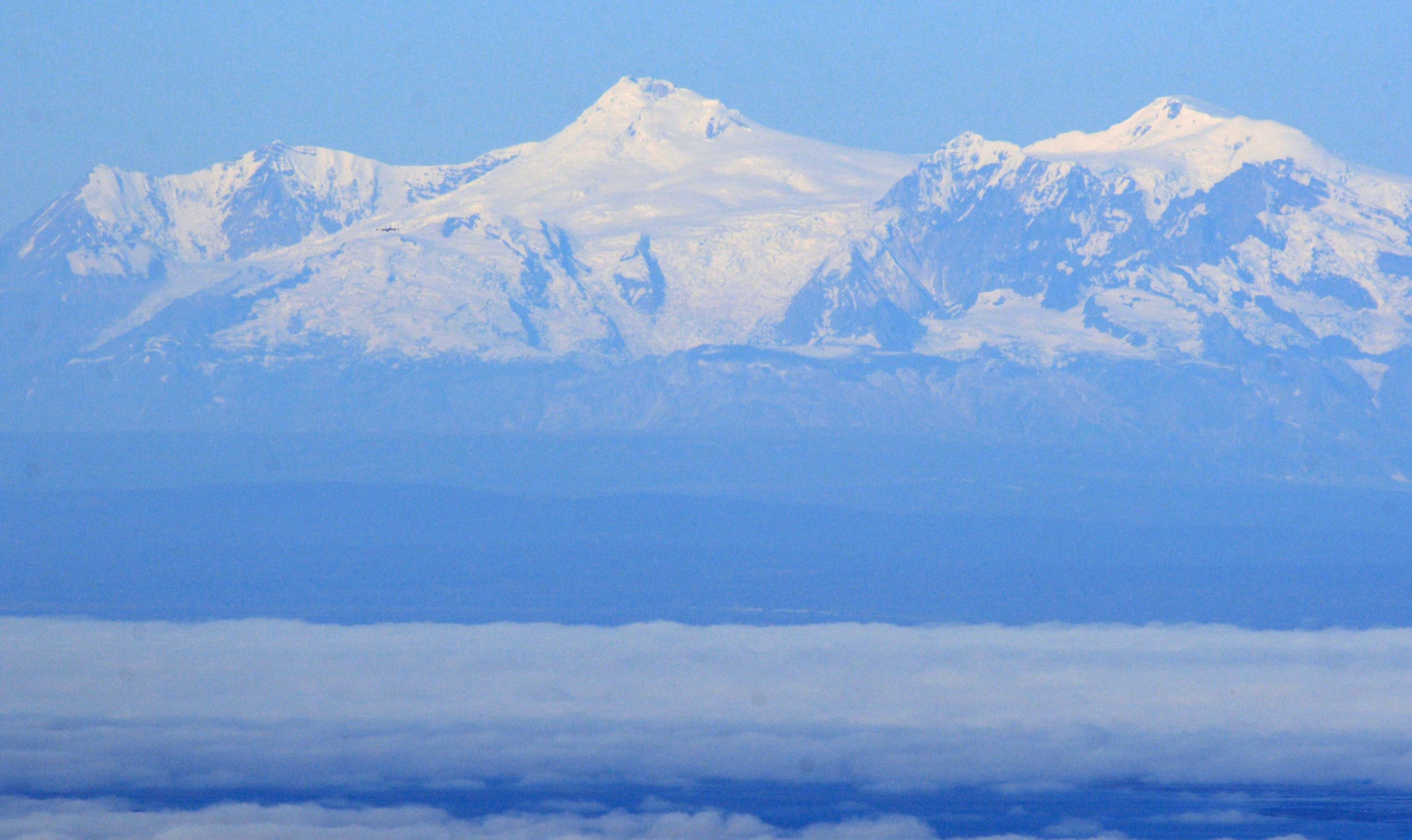
Mount Spurr (center) and Mount Chichantna (upper right) from east

== See also ==
- Mount Chichantna
