= Arctic Circle Air =

American airline

IATA	ICAO	Call sign
5F	CIR	AIR ARCTIC
- Founded: 1973; 53 years ago
- Ceased operations: 2011; 15 years ago (bought by Marianas Harvests from Era Alaska)
- Focus cities: Fairbanks Airport
- Fleet size: 2
- Destinations: 9
- Headquarters: Saipan, United States

Arctic Circle Air was an American airline based in Fairbanks, Alaska, USA. It operated scheduled commuter services and charter flights to over 16 Alaskan communities. It was established and started operations in 1973. Its main base was Fairbanks International Airport.

== Acquisition Merger ==
In October 2009 Arctic Circle Air was acquired by the parent company of Frontier Alaska. Arctic Circle Air was merged into the Era Alaska operation. Era Alaska is the renamed operation of Frontier Alaska now that it has been blended into the operating certificate of Era Aviation. In 2011 Arctic Circle Air's certificate was obtained by Marianas Harvests in Guam to provide service throughout the island areas of Guam, with no association with Era Alaska or Frontier Alaska.

== Fleet ==
- 2 Britten-Norman BN-2Ts
- Beech King Air
- Cessna 207
- Cessna 402 Utiliner
- Embraer Bandeirante
- Piper Lance
- Short C-23 Sherpa
- Short Skyvan
- Short 330

== Destinations ==
Arctic Circle Air operates services to the following domestic scheduled destinations (Ended as of November 2009).

1. Allakaket (AET) - Allakaket Airport
2. Anaktuvuk Pass (AKP) - Anaktuvuk Pass Airport
3. Arctic Village (ARC) - Arctic Village Airport
4. Bettles (BTT) - Bettles Airport
5. Chalkyitsik (CIK) - Chalkyitsik Airport
6. Eagle (EAA) - Eagle Airport
7. Fairbanks (FAI) - Fairbanks International Airport
8. Fort Yukon (FYU) - Fort Yukon Airport
9. Galena (GAL) - Edward G. Pitka Sr. Airport
10. Hughes (HUS) - Hughes Airport
11. Huslia (HSL) - Huslia Airport
12. Kaltag (KAL) - Kaltag Airport
13. Nulato (NUL) - Nulato Airport
14. Rampart (RMP) - Rampart Airport
15. Tanana (TAL) - Ralph M. Calhoun Memorial Airport
16. Venetie (VEE) - Venetie Airport

== See also ==
- List of defunct airlines of the United States
