= Hughes Airport (Alaska) =

Airport in Alaska, United States

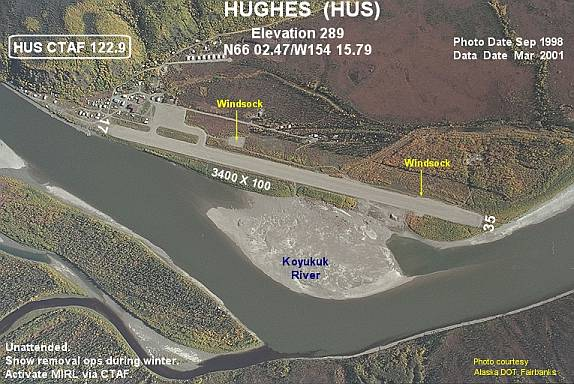
- IATA: HUS; ICAO: PAHU; FAA LID: HUS

Summary
- Airport type: Public
- Owner: State of Alaska DOT&PF - Northern Region
- Serves: Hughes, Alaska
- Elevation AMSL: 299 ft (91 m)
- Coordinates: 66°02′21″N 154°15′53″W

Map
- Location of airport in Alaska

Runways
Direction	Length		Surface
Direction	ft	m	Surface
17/35	3,380	1,030	Gravel

Statistics
- Enplanements (2007): 1,148
- Aircraft operations (2005): 1,480
- Source: Federal Aviation Administration

Hughes Airport (IATA: HUS, ICAO: PAHU, FAA LID: HUS) is a state-owned public-use airport located one nautical mile (1.85 km) southwest of the central business district of Hughes, a city in the Yukon-Koyukuk Census Area of the U.S. state of Alaska.

As per Federal Aviation Administration records, this airport had 1,148 passenger boardings (enplanements) in calendar year 2007, an increase of 1% from the 1,137 enplanements in 2006.

== Facilities and aircraft ==
Hughes Airport has one runway (17/25) with a gravel surface measuring 3,380 by 100 feet (1,030 x 30 m). For the 12-month period ending December 31, 2005, the airport had 1,480 aircraft operations, an average of 123 per month: 74% air taxi, 25% general aviation and 1% military.

== Airlines and destinations ==
The following airlines offer scheduled passenger service at this airport:

Airlines	Destinations
Wright Air Service	Allakaket, Bettles, Fairbanks, Huslia, Tanana

=== Statistics ===
Top domestic destinations: July 2023 – June 2024
Rank	City	Airport	Passengers
1	Fairbanks, AK	Fairbanks International Airport (FAI)	890
2	Huslia, AK	Huslia Airport (HSL)	40
3	Allakaket, AK	Allakaket Airport (AET)	10
4	Ruby, AK	Ruby Airport (RBY)	10
5	Tanana, AK	Tanana Airport (TAL)	<10

== See also ==
- List of airports in Alaska
