= Huslia Airport =

Airport in Yukon-Koyukuk, Alaska, US

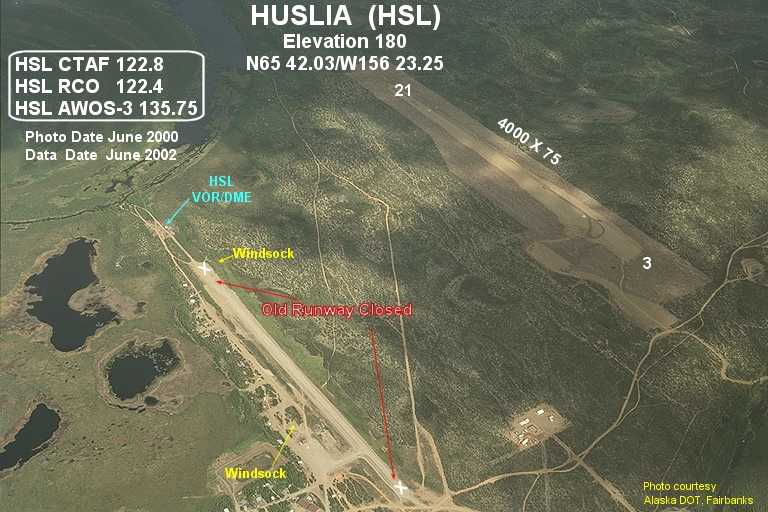
- IATA: HSL; ICAO: PAHL; FAA LID: HLA

Summary
- Airport type: Public
- Owner: State of Alaska DOT&PF - Northern Region
- Serves: Huslia, Alaska
- Elevation AMSL: 213 ft (65 m)
- Coordinates: 65°42′07″N 156°23′14″W

Map
- Location of airport in Alaska

Runways
Direction	Length		Surface
Direction	ft	m	Surface
3/21	4,000	1,219	Gravel
- Source: Federal Aviation Administration

Huslia Airport (IATA: HSL, ICAO: PAHL, FAA LID: HLA) is a state-owned public-use airport located one nautical mile (1.85 km) east of Huslia, a city in Yukon-Koyukuk Census Area, Alaska, United States.

== Facilities ==
Huslia Airport covers an area of 203 acres (82 ha) at an elevation of 220 feet (67 m) above mean sea level. It has one runway designated 3/21 with a gravel surface measuring 4,000 by 75 feet (1,219 x 23 m). This replaced the former runway, which had the same designation and measured 3,000 by 60 feet (914 m × 18 m).

Although most U.S. airports use the same three-letter location identifier for the FAA and IATA, this airport is assigned HLA by the FAA and HSL by the IATA (which assigned HLA to Lanseria Airport in Lanseria, South Africa). The airport's ICAO identifier is PAHL.

== Airlines and destinations ==
Airlines	Destinations
Everts Air	Fairbanks
Wright Air Service	Fairbanks, Galena, Hughes, Ruby, Tanana

=== Statistics ===
Carrier shares: July 2023 – June 2024
Carrier	Passengers (arriving and departing)
Wright Air	5,570(87.05%)
Everts Air	830(12.95%)

Top domestic destinations: July 2023 – June 2024
Rank	City	Airport	Passengers
1	Fairbanks, AK	Fairbanks International Airport (FAI)	2,270
2	Galena, AK	Galena Airport (GAL)	600
3	Ruby, AK	Ruby Airport (RBY)	200
4	Hughes, AK	Hughes Airport (HUS)	40
5	Tanana, AK	Tanana Airport (TAL)	30
6	Nulato, AK	Nulato Airport (NUL)	20
7	Minto, AK	Minto Airport (MNT)	20
8	Koyukuk, AK	Koyukuk Airport (KYU)	10
9	Allakaket, AK	Allakaket Airport (AET)	10
10	Nenana, AK	Nenana Airport (ENN)	<10

== See also ==
- List of airports in Alaska
