= Hogatza River =

- Location of the mouth of the Hogatza River in Alaska

Location
- Country: United States
- State: Alaska
- District: Northwest Arctic Borough, Yukon–Koyukuk Census Area

Physical characteristics
- Source: Gates of the Arctic National Park and Preserve
  - location: near the Continental Divide in the Helpmejack Hills, Northwest Arctic Borough
  - coordinates: 66°56′47″N 154°12′39″W
  - elevation: 1,638 ft (499 m)
- Mouth: Koyukuk River
  - location: 32 miles (51 km) west-southwest of Hughes, Yukon–Koyukuk Census Area
  - coordinates: 65°59′56″N 155°23′51″W
  - elevation: 207 ft (63 m)
- Length: 120 mi (190 km)

The Hogatza River (Koyukon: Hʉgaadzaat No’; Iñupiaq: Kuuġuqpak or Haukaatchiatnaaq) is a 120-mile (190 km) tributary of the Koyukuk River in the U.S. state of Alaska. Beginning in the Gates of the Arctic National Park and Preserve, it flows generally southwest to meet the larger river west of Hughes. The river's name is from the Koyukon language, but the meaning is uncertain.

== See also ==
- List of rivers of Alaska
