= Koyukuk River =

River in Alaska, United States

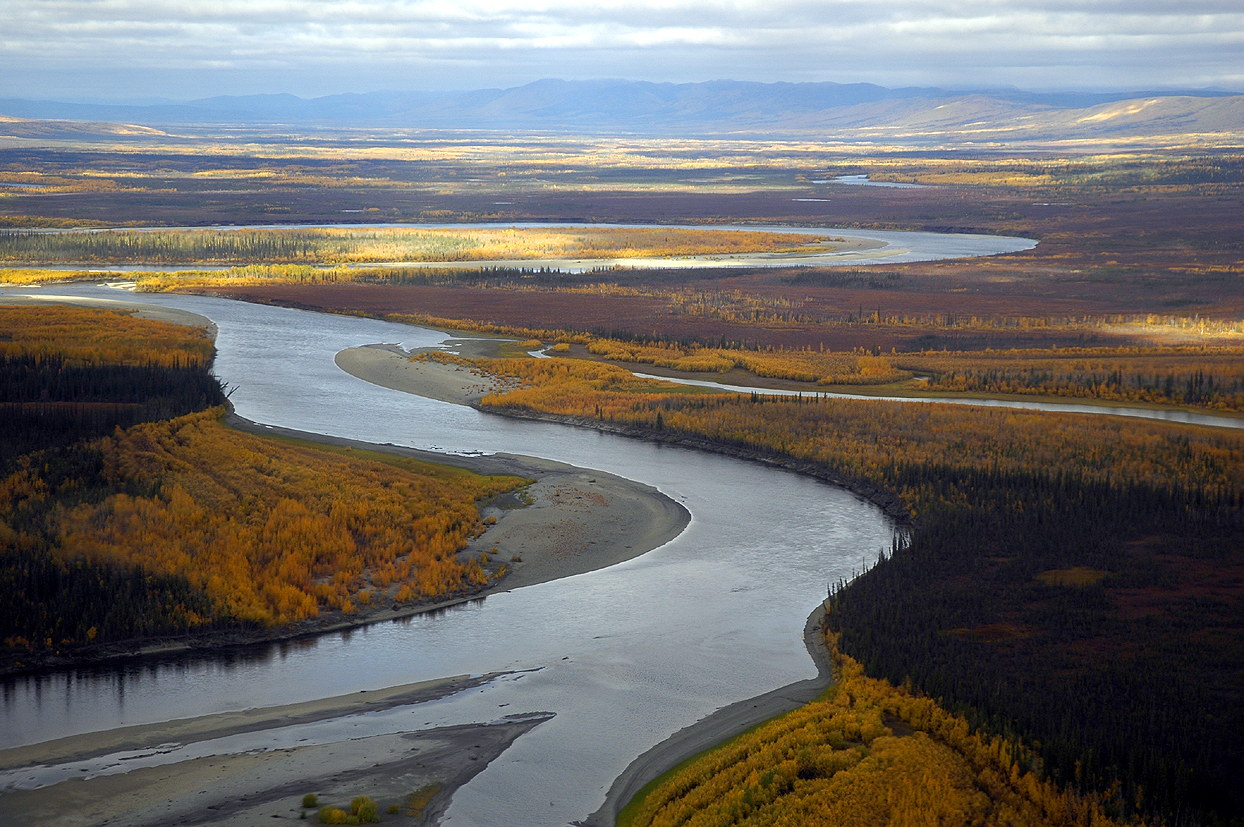
- Flowing through the Kanuti National Wildlife Refuge

- Location of the mouth of the Koyukuk River in Alaska
- Etymology: Koyukon people
- Native name: Ooghekuhno' (Koyukon); Kuuyukaq (Inupiaq)

Location
- Country: United States
- State: Alaska
- Census Area: Yukon-Koyukuk
- Cities: Evansville, Bettles, Allakaket, Hughes, Huslia

Physical characteristics
- Source: confluence of North and Middle forks
  - location: Brooks Range
  - coordinates: 67°02′49″N 151°04′26″W
  - elevation: 715 ft (218 m)
- Mouth: Yukon River
  - location: Koyukuk
  - coordinates: 64°55′24″N 157°33′14″W
  - elevation: 115 ft (35 m)
- Length: 425 mi (684 km)
- Basin size: 32,000 sq mi (83,000 km^{2})
- Discharge
  - location: Hughes
  - average: 14,250 cu ft/s (404 m^{3}/s)
  - minimum: 280 cu ft/s (7.9 m^{3}/s)
  - maximum: 330,000 cu ft/s (9,300 m^{3}/s)

The Koyukuk River (/ˈkaɪəkʊk/; Ooghekuhno' in Koyukon, Kuuyukaq or Tagraġvik in Iñupiaq) is a 425-mile (684 km) tributary of the Yukon River, in the U.S. state of Alaska. It is the last major tributary entering the Yukon before the larger river empties into the Bering Sea.

Rising at the confluence of the North Fork Koyukuk River with the Middle Fork Koyukuk River, it flows generally southwest to meet the larger Yukon River at Koyukuk. The river, with headwaters above the Arctic Circle in the Endicott Mountains of the Brooks Range, drains an area north of the Yukon River that includes part of the Gates of the Arctic National Park and Preserve, as well as Kanuti National Wildlife Refuge and Koyukuk National Wildlife Refuge.

The main stem of the river is lined by the communities of Evansville, Bettles, Alatna, Allakaket, Hughes, and Huslia before reaching Koyukuk. Its headwaters tributaries include the Koyukuk's south, middle, and north forks, the Alatna River, and the John River. Major tributaries further downstream include the Kanuti, Batzu, Hogatza, Huslia, Dulbi, Kateel, and Gisasa rivers. Of these, the Alatna, John, and North Fork are National Wild and Scenic Rivers, as is the Tinayguk River, a tributary of the North Fork.

== Name ==
Koyukuk was derived from the Central Yup'ik phrase kuik-yuk, meaning a river. The Koyukuk River was given this generic Central Yup'ik name by Russian explorer Petr Vasilii Malakhov, because he did not know the local Koyukon name for it (i.e., Ooghekuhno). The Western Union Telegraph Expedition used the spelling of Coyukuk before the United States Board on Geographic Names settled on Koyukuk.

== History ==
The Russian Petr Vasilii Malakhov reached the river at its confluence with the Yukon in 1838. The United States acquired Alaska after the American Civil War, but it was 1885 before US representatives Lieutenant Henry Allen and Private Fred Fickett of the United States Army ascended and explored the river. The discovery of gold deposits by Johnnie Folger on the Middle Fork in 1893 on The Tramway bar led to a gold rush in 1898; trading posts and mining camps, including Bettles, were rapidly developed on the upper river.

In 1929, Robert "Bob" Marshall explored the North Fork of the Koyukuk River, and identified what he called the Gates of the Arctic.

In 1980 the United States Congress designated 100 mi (164 km) of the North Fork of the Koyukuk River in the Brooks Range as the Koyukuk Wild and Scenic River, which authorized certain levels of protection for the habitat.

In 1994 the river flooded, sweeping away three villages, forcing the wholesale relocation of the population.

== Flora and fauna ==
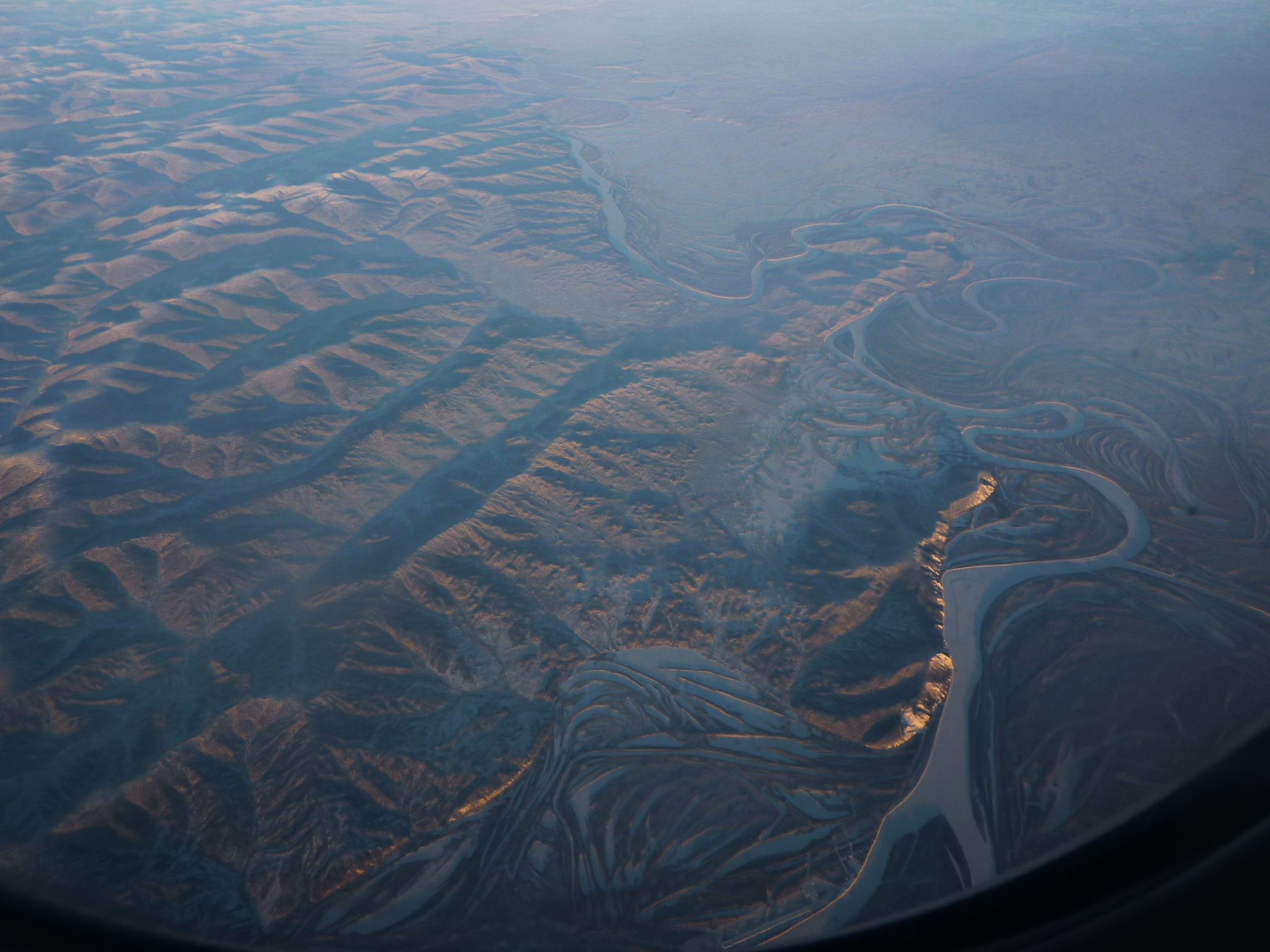
Lower course of the Koyukuk in winter

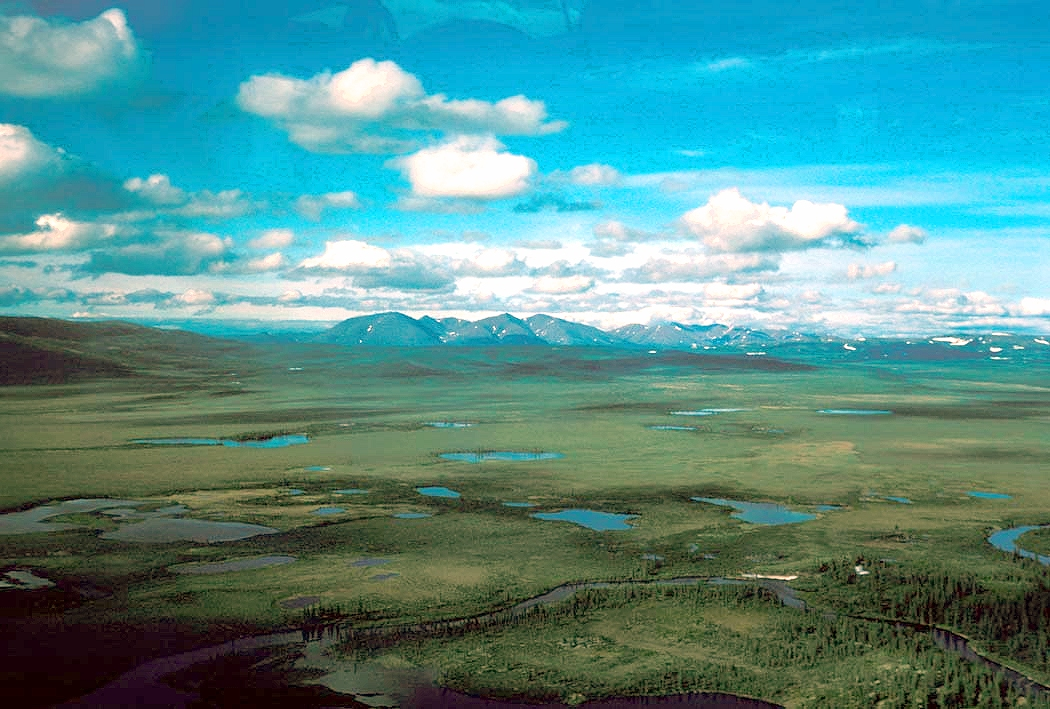
Zane Hills and Koyukuk River

Vegetation along the Koyukuk River, sparse along the upper reaches, consists of tundra plants such as dwarf willows and other shrubs, sedges, and lichens. Further downstream at lower elevations, taiga and boreal forest plants are common except in the Koyukuk Flats near the mouth, where sedges and other herbaceous plants dominate the poorly drained muskeg. Trees found in more well-drained areas along the river include mountain alder, trembling aspen, white, and black spruce.

Fish species frequenting the lower Koyukuk include Arctic lamprey and sockeye salmon. The sockeye and other salmon species, including Chinook and chum, also thrive along the upper reaches and tributaries.

Caribou migrate across the upper part of the Koyukuk watershed. Other major vertebrates in the region include bald eagles, brown and black bears, mink, beaver, marten, and river otter. Beluga whales sometimes visit the lower Koyukuk.

Moose herds, which thrive in parts of the watershed, especially in riparian zones downstream of Hughes, attract local and non-local hunters, bears, and wolves. A consortium of moose hunters and state wildlife officials work to keep the moose population at sustainable levels.

Through 2005, no one had published a study of invertebrates of the Koyukuk or its larger tributaries. General information included in a study related to pipeline construction through the watershed suggested the presence of a variety of true flies, midges, black flies, mayflies, stoneflies, and caddisflies.

== See also ==
- List of rivers of Alaska
- List of National Wild and Scenic Rivers
- Reuben D'Aigle

== Works cited ==
- Benke, Arthur C., ed., and Cushing, Colbert E., ed.; Bailey, Robert C. (2005). "Chapter 17: Yukon River Basin" in Rivers of North America. Burlington, Massachusetts: Elsevier Academic Press. ISBN 0-12-088253-1. OCLC 59003378.
