= Kanuti River =

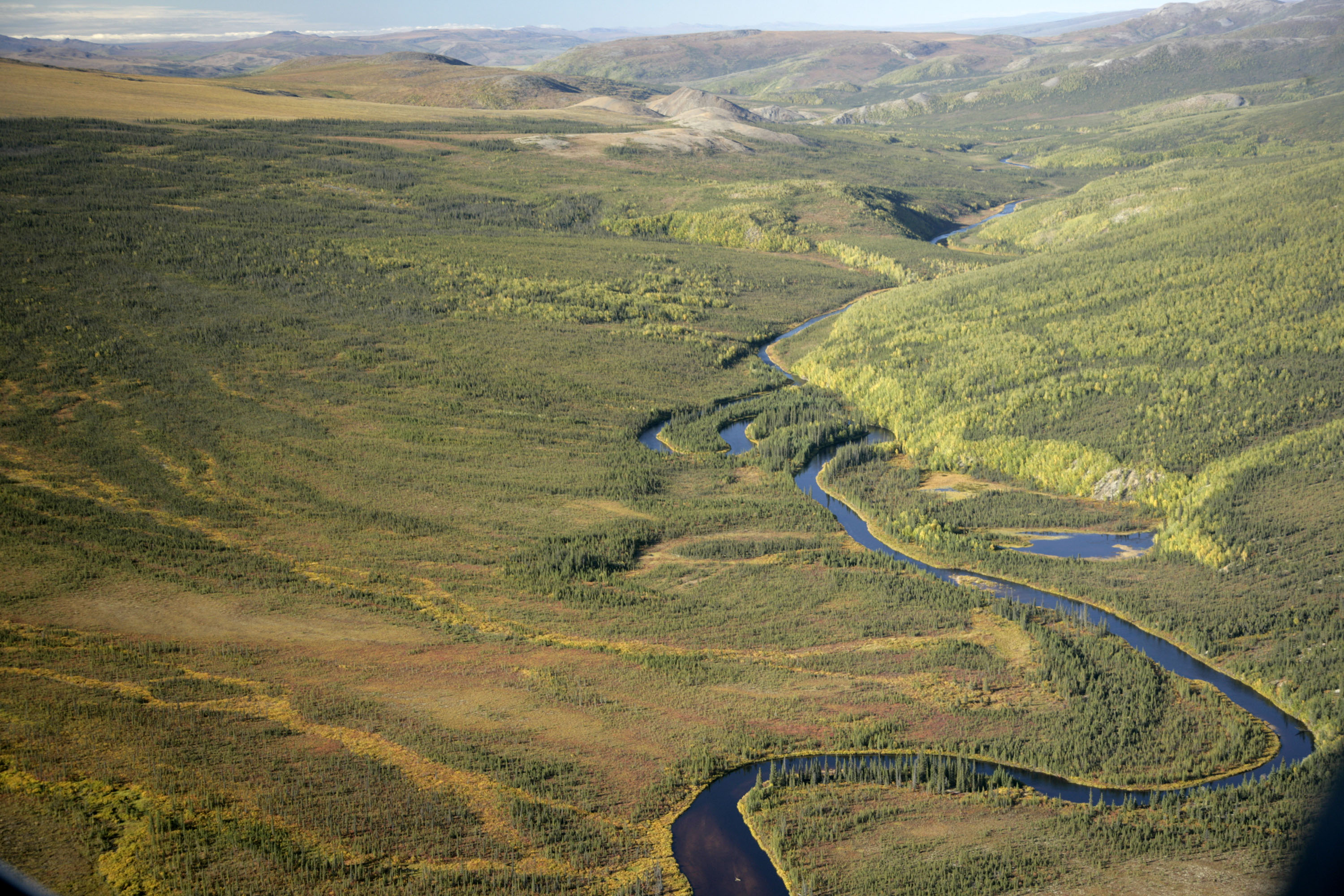

- Location of the mouth of the Kanuti River in Alaska

Location
- Country: United States
- State: Alaska
- Census Area: Yukon–Koyukuk

Physical characteristics
- Source: near western border of the Yukon Flats National Wildlife Refuge
  - location: east of the Dalton Highway and slightly south of the Arctic Circle
  - coordinates: 66°31′12″N 150°04′22″W
  - elevation: 3,312 ft (1,009 m)
- Mouth: Koyukuk River
  - location: Kanuti National Wildlife Refuge, 13 miles (21 km) southwest of Allakaket
  - coordinates: 66°26′48″N 152°59′51″W
  - elevation: 381 ft (116 m)
- Length: 175 mi (282 km)

The Kanuti (Kkʼoonootnoʼ in Koyukon) is a 175-mile (282 km) tributary of the Koyukuk River in the U.S. state of Alaska. The river begins near the Arctic Circle and flows generally west, passing under the Dalton Highway near Caribou Mountain. After continuing through a relatively flat basin, it enters a 1,200-foot (370 m) deep canyon before meeting the larger river near Allakaket. The Kanuti National Wildlife Refuge covers a large part of the river basin.

== See also ==
- List of rivers of Alaska
