= Wright Air Service =

Regional airline in Alaska, USA

IATA	ICAO	Call sign
8V	WRF	WRIGHT FLYER
- Founded: 1967; 59 years ago
- AOC #: HYTA069A
- Operating bases: Fairbanks International Airport
- Fleet size: 21
- Destinations: 18
- Headquarters: Fairbanks, Alaska, United States
- Key people: Matt Atkinson; Lee Kenaston; Brett Carlson
- Website: WrightAirService.com

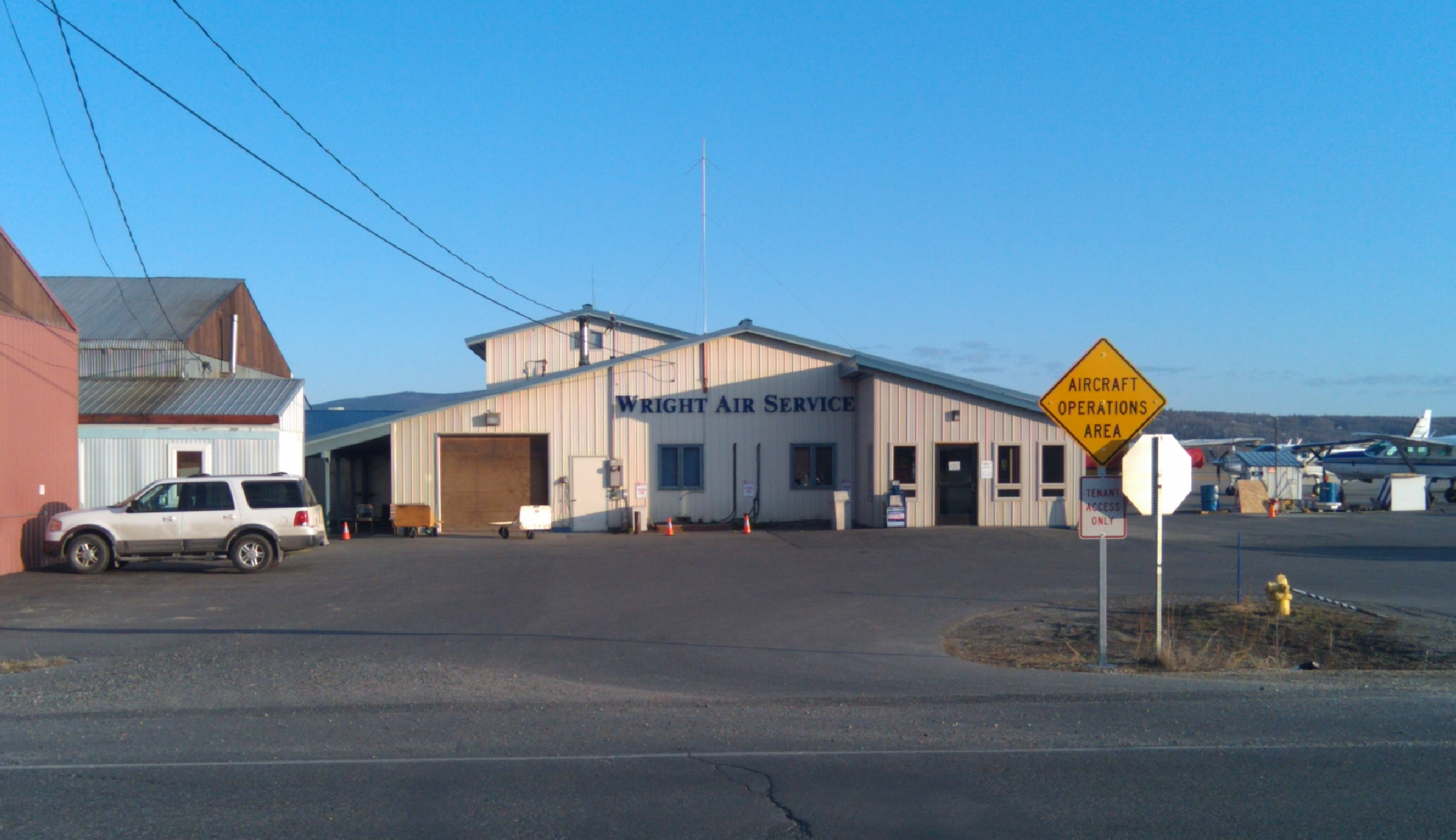
Wright Air Service terminal building

Wright Air Service is an American commuter airline based in Fairbanks, Alaska, United States. It was established by Al Wright and started operations in 1967. It is located off the east ramp near the Fairbanks International Airport. The president of the company was Robert Bursiel, but the company was bought out by a new owner in 2017.

== History ==
Bob Bursiel, former president, started as a pilot for Wright's in 1968. As the company grew, more aircraft joined the fleet. Bursiel then became the owner of Wright's in 1982, changing the company's focus from game surveys, short fields, and Trans-Alaska Pipeline construction support, to carrying passengers and mail to the remote villages of Alaska.

== Fleet ==
The Wright Air Service fleet includes the following aircraft:

Plane Name	Number in Operation	Number of Passengers	Cruise Speed (kn)	Fuel Range (h)	Load Limit (lb)
Beechcraft Bonanza	1	3	165	5	750
Cessna Grand Caravan	11	9	165	6	2000-2400
Cessna 206	2	4	125	5	900
Piper Navajo Chieftain	2	8	175	5	1400
Piper Navajo	1	6	175	5	1200
Helio Courier	4	3	110	5	750
Total	21				

On 7 July 2020, Wright Air acquired 4 Cessna planes at Ravn Alaska's bankruptcy auction.

== Destinations ==
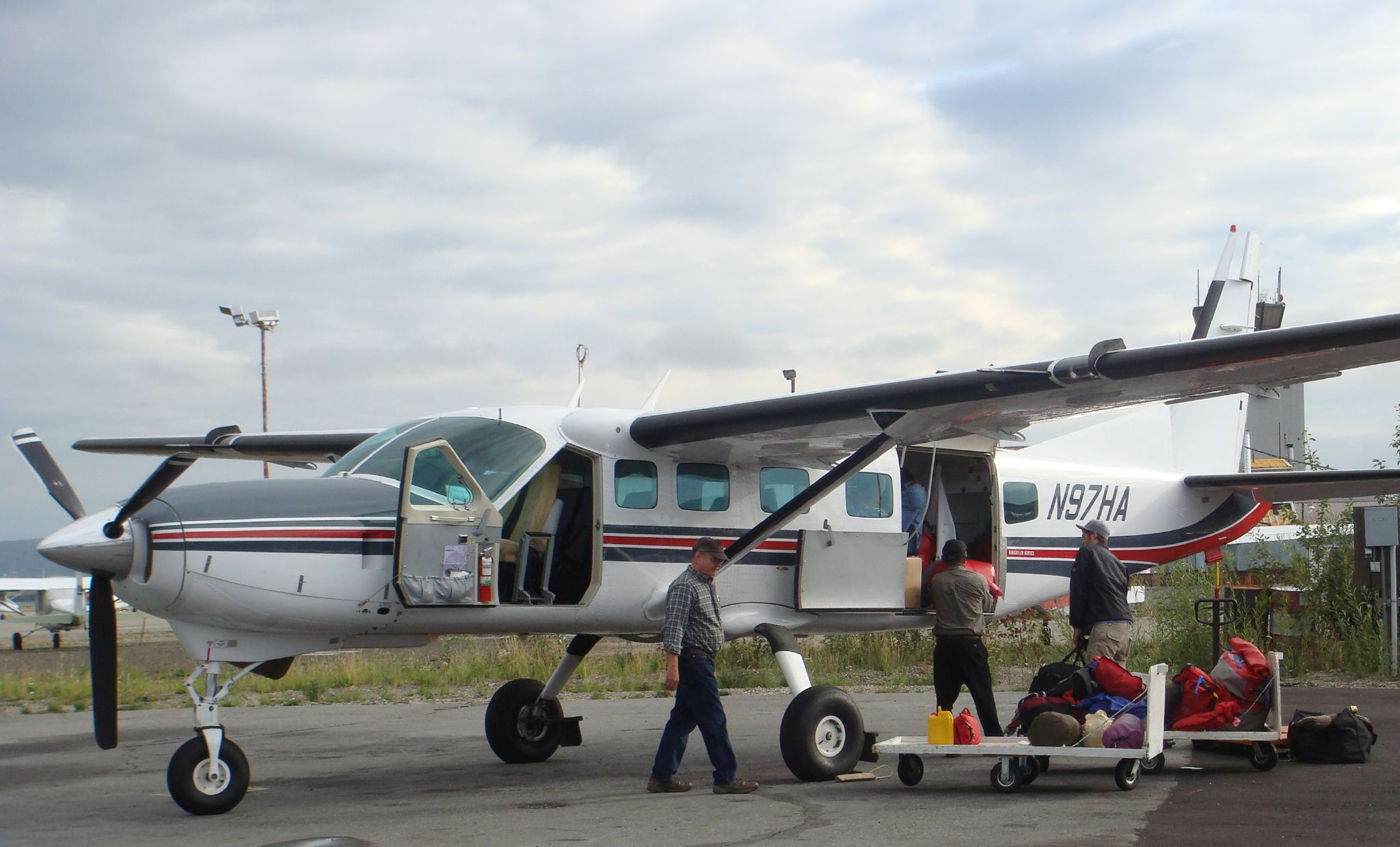
Wright Air Cessna 208 Caravan loading at Fairbanks International Airport

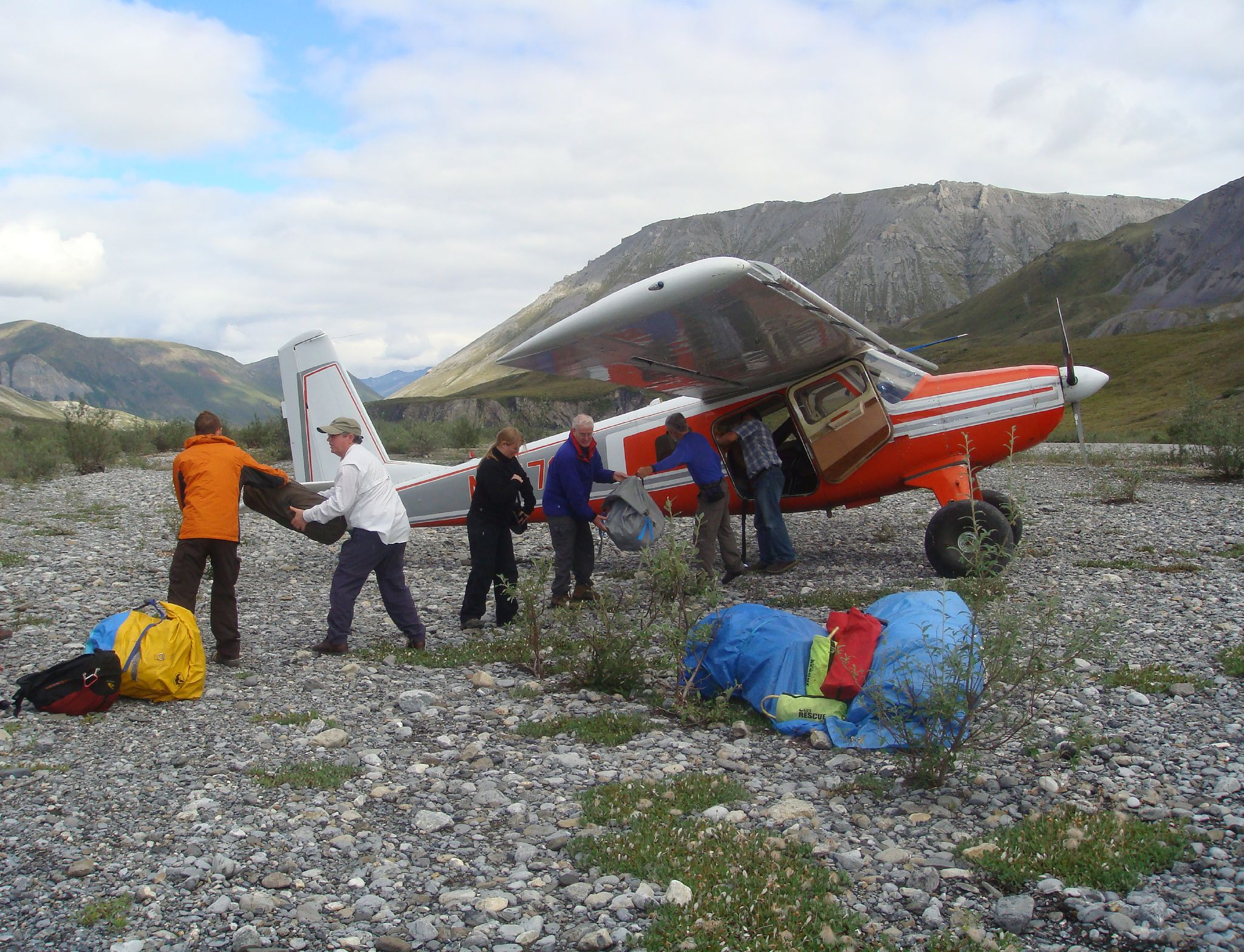
Wright Air Helio Courier unloading a rafting party

Wright Air Service operates scheduled passenger flights to the following locations in Alaska (as of July 2020):

1. Allakaket (AET) - Allakaket Airport (to Bettles, Fairbanks)
2. Atqasuk (ATK) - Atqasuk Airport (to Wainwright, Utqiagvik)
3. Anaktuvuk Pass (AKP) - Anaktuvuk Pass Airport (to Bettles, Coldfoot, Fairbanks)
4. Arctic Village (ARC) - Arctic Village Airport (to Fairbanks, Fort Yukon, Venetie)
5. Bettles (BTT) - Bettles Airport (to Allakaket, Anaktuvuk Pass, Fairbanks)
6. Coldfoot (CXF) - Coldfoot Airport
7. Chalkyitsik (CIK) - Chalkyitsik Airport
8. Deadhorse (SCC) - Deadhorse Airport (To Fairbanks, Nuiqsut, Utqiagvik)
9. Birch Creek (KBC) - Birch Creek Airport (to Fairbanks, Venetie)
10. Fairbanks (FAI) - Fairbanks International Airport (hub)
11. Fort Yukon (FYU) - Fort Yukon Airport (to Arctic Village, Birch Creek, Fairbanks, Venetie)
12. Galena (GAL) - Edward G. Pitka Sr. Airport (to Kaltag)
13. Hughes (HUS) - Hughes Airport (to Fairbanks, Tanana)
14. Huslia (HSL) - Huslia Airport (to Fairbanks, Hughes, Tanana, Ruby)
15. Kaltag (KAL) - Kaltag Airport (to Nulato)
16. Koyukuk (KYU) - Koyukuk Airport (to Huslia)
17. Lake Minchumina (LMA) - Minchumina Airport (to Fairbanks)
18. Nuiqsut (NUI) - Nuiqsut Airport (to Deadhorse, Utqiagvik)
19. Nulato (NUL) - Nulato Airport (to Koyukuk)
20. Point Hope, Alaska (PHO) - Point Hope Airport (to Point Lay, Utqiagvik)
21. Point Lay, Alaska (PIZ) - Point Lay Airport (to Point Hope, Utqiagvik)
22. Ruby (RBY) - Ruby Airport (to Fairbanks)
23. Tanana (TAL) - Ralph M. Calhoun Memorial Airport (to Fairbanks, Hughes, Huslia)
24. Utqiagvik (BRW) - Wiley Post–Will Rogers Memorial Airport (hub)
25. Venetie (VEE) - Venetie Airport (to Arctic Village, Birch Creek, Fairbanks, Fort Yukon)
26. Wainwright (AIN) - Wainwright Airport (to Atqasuk, Utqiagvik)

Wright Air Service also provides charter service.
