= Bettle =

Bettle or Bettles may refer to:

- Bettles, Alaska, in the United States

== People ==
- Alison Bettles (born 1969), English television actress
- Artie Bettles (1891–1971), Australian footballer
- John Bettles (1907–1983), English lawn bowler
- Sarah Bettles (born 1992), British archer

== Other ==
- Bettles Airport, airport in Beetles, Alaska
- Bettle Peak, peak in Antarctica
- Bettle Juice, 1988 American horror comedy film
