= Ralph M. Calhoun Memorial Airport =

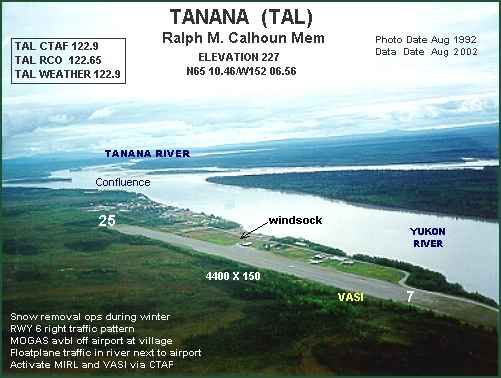
- IATA: TAL; ICAO: PATA; FAA LID: TAL

Summary
- Airport type: Public
- Owner: State of Alaska DOT&PF - Northern Region
- Serves: Tanana, Alaska
- Elevation AMSL: 236 ft / 72 m
- Coordinates: 65°10′28″N 152°06′34″W

Map
- Location of airport in Alaska

Runways
Direction	Length		Surface
Direction	ft	m	Surface
7/25	4,400	1,341	Gravel

Statistics (2009)
- Aircraft operations: 3,100
- Source: Federal Aviation Administration

Ralph M. Calhoun Memorial Airport (IATA: TAL, ICAO: PATA, FAA LID: TAL) is a state-owned public-use airport located one nautical mile (1.85 km) west of the central business district of Tanana, a city in the Yukon-Koyukuk Census Area of the U.S. state of Alaska.

As per Federal Aviation Administration records, the airport had 3,549 passenger boardings (enplanements) in calendar year 2008, 3,298 enplanements in 2009, and 3,241 in 2010. It is included in the National Plan of Integrated Airport Systems for 2011–2015, which categorized it as a non-primary commercial service airport (between 2,500 and 10,000 enplanements per year).

== Facilities and aircraft ==
Ralph M. Calhoun Memorial Airport covers an area of 1,650 acres (668 ha) at an elevation of 236 feet (72 m) above mean sea level. It has one runway designated 7/25 with a gravel surface measuring 4,400 by 150 feet (1,341 x 46 m).

For the 12-month period ending September 29, 2009, the airport had 3,100 aircraft operations, an average of 258 per month: 55% general aviation, 43% air taxi, and 2% military.

== Airlines and destinations ==
The following airlines offer scheduled passenger service at this airport:

Airlines	Destinations
Wright Air Service	Fairbanks, Hughes, Huslia, Ruby

=== Statistics ===
Carrier shares: July 2023 – June 2024
Carrier	Passengers (arriving and departing)
Wright Air	3,100(100.00%)

Top domestic destinations: July 2023 – June 2024
Rank	City	Airport	Passengers
1	Fairbanks, AK	Fairbanks International Airport (FAI)	1,500
2	Huslia, AK	Huslia Airport (HSL)	30
3	Galena, AK	Galena Airport (BTT)	10
4	Hughes, AK	Hughes Airport (HUS)	<10
5	Ruby, AK	Ruby Airport (RBY)	<10

== See also ==
- List of airports in Alaska
