= Yukon–Koyukuk School District =

School district in Alaska, United States

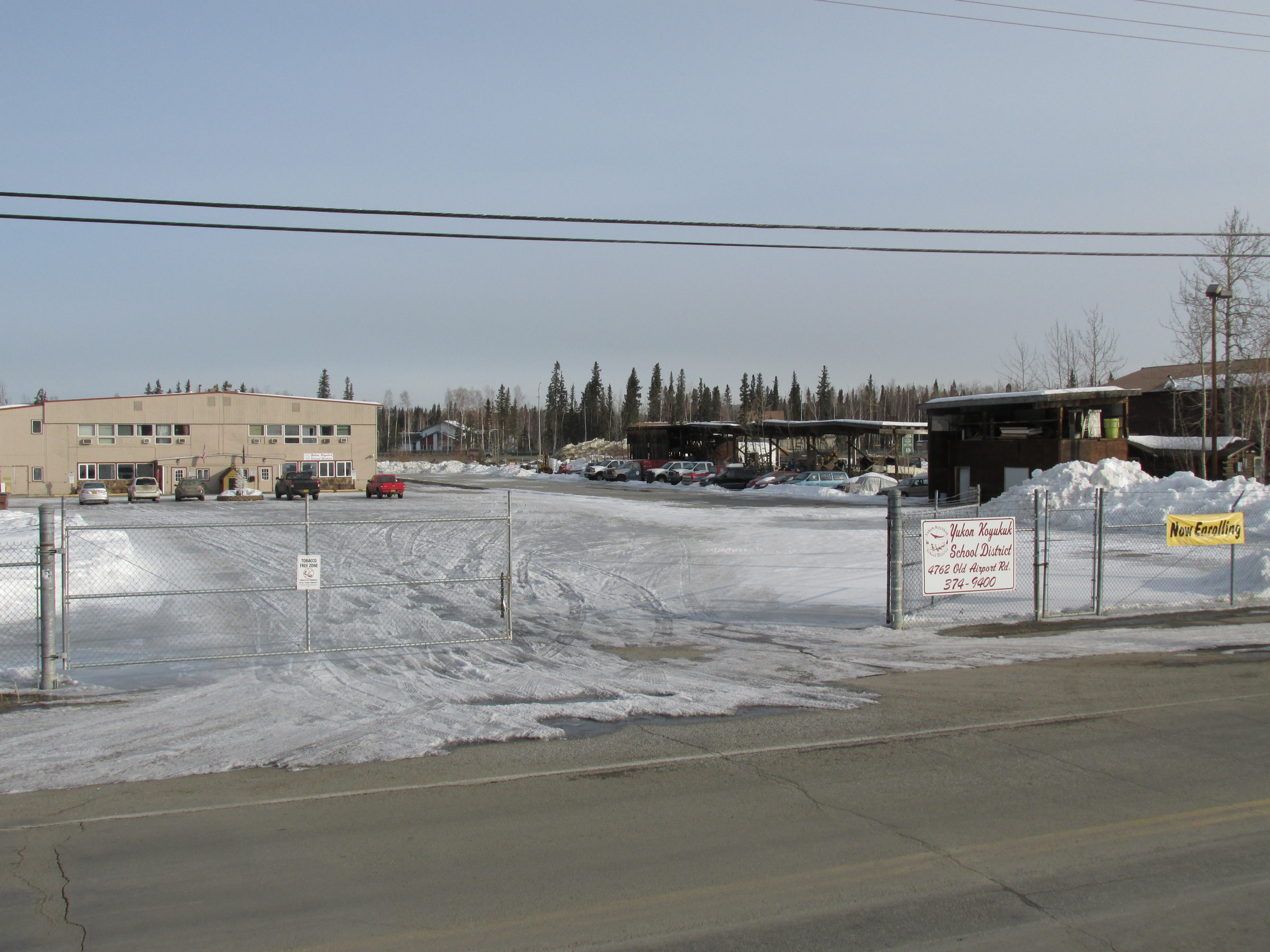
- District headquarters

Address
- 4762 Old Airport Way Fairbanks, Alaska, 99709; United States

District information
- Type: Public
- Grades: Pre-K–12
- Superintendent: Kerry Boyd
- School board: Vice President - Shirley Kruger; Treasurer - Ruth Folger; Secretary - Anne Titus; Member - Wilmer Beetus; Member - Gloria Patsy
- Chair of the board: Fred Bifelt
- NCES District ID: 0200862

Students and staff
- Students: 4,024
- Teachers: 77.1
- Staff: 122.55
- Student–teacher ratio: 52.19

Other information
- Website: www.yksd.com

Yukon–Koyukuk School District (YKSD) is a school district headquartered in College, a census-designated place in Fairbanks North Star Borough, Alaska. It serves the Yukon–Koyukuk Census Area.

== Schools ==
- Allakaket School (Allakaket)
- Andrew K. Demoski School (Nulato)
- Jimmy Huntington School (Huslia)
- Kaltag School (Kaltag)
- Merreline A. Kangas School (Ruby)
- Minto School (Minto)
- Johnny Oldman School (Hughes)
- Ella B. Vernetti School (Koyukuk)
- Rampart School (Rampart)

Students may also receive services from the Raven Homeschool statewide homeschooling program.

Closed schools:

- Bettles - Bettles Field School
- Coldfoot
- Gladys Dart School (Manley Hot Springs) - It closed in 2019 due to a lack of enrollment. The village council acquired the school property from the school district in February 2021.
- Wiseman
