= Allakaket Airport =

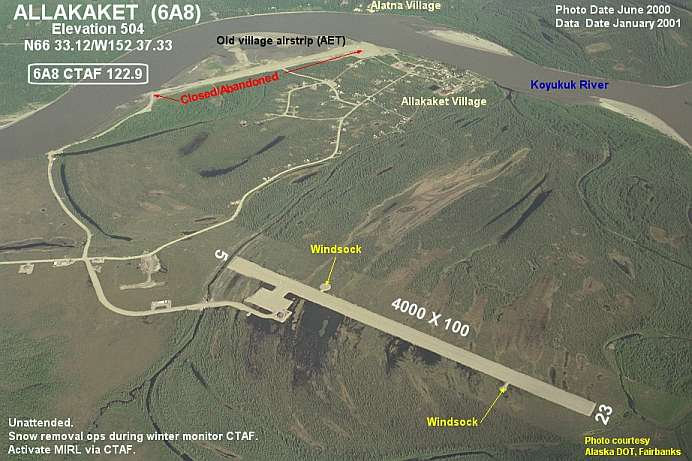
- IATA: AET; ICAO: PFAL; FAA LID: 6A8

Summary
- Airport type: Public
- Owner: State of Alaska DOT&PF - Northern Region
- Serves: Allakaket, Alaska
- Elevation AMSL: 441 ft (134 m)
- Coordinates: 66°33′07″N 152°37′20″W

Map
- Location of airport in Alaska

Runways
Direction	Length		Surface
Direction	ft	m	Surface
5/23	4,000	1,219	Gravel

Statistics (2015)
- Aircraft operations: 1,220 (2014)
- Based aircraft: 0
- Passengers: 1,437 (2024)
- Freight: 591,000 lbs
- Source: Federal Aviation Administration and Bureau of Transportation Statistics

Allakaket Airport (IATA: AET, ICAO: PFAL, FAA LID: 6A8), is a state-owned public-use airport located two nautical miles (4 km) north-northwest of the central business district of Allakaket, a city in the Yukon-Koyukuk Census Area of the U.S. state of Alaska. The airport is sometimes referred to as the New Allakaket Airport because it was constructed on a site southeast of the original airport which is now closed.

As per Federal Aviation Administration records, this airport had 2,505 passenger boardings (enplanements) in calendar year 2007, an increase of 27% from the 1,969 enplanements in 2006. According to statistics of the Bureau of Transportation Statistics, the passenger count decreased to 1,437 in 2024.

== Facilities and aircraft ==
Allakaket Airport has one runway designated 5/23 with a gravel surface measuring 4,000 by 100 feet (1,219 x 30 m). For the 12-month period ending December 31, 2005, the airport had 2,270 aircraft operations, an average of 189 per month: 53% air taxi, 46% general aviation and 1% military.

== Airlines and destinations ==
The following airlines offer scheduled passenger service at this airport:

Airlines	Destinations
Wright Air Service	Bettles, Fairbanks, Hughes

=== Statistics ===
Carrier shares: July 2023 – June 2024
Carrier	Passengers (arriving and departing)
Wright Air	2,860(100.00%)

Top domestic destinations: July 2023 – June 2024
Rank	City	Airport	Passengers
1	Fairbanks, AK	Fairbanks International Airport (FAI)	1,360
2	Hughes, AK	Hughes Airport (HUS)	80
3	Bettles, AK	Bettles Airport (BTT)	10
4	Anaktuvuk Pass, AK	Anaktuvuk Pass Airport (AKP)	<10

== See also ==
- List of airports in Alaska
