= Huslia River =

- Location of the mouth of the Huslia River in Alaska

Location
- Country: United States
- State: Alaska
- Census Area: Yukon–Koyukuk

Physical characteristics
- Source: confluence of the river's north and south forks
  - location: Koyukuk National Wildlife Refuge
  - coordinates: 65°56′42″N 156°40′38″W
  - elevation: 162 ft (49 m)
- Mouth: Koyukuk River
  - location: 5 miles (8 km) northwest of Huslia
  - coordinates: 65°44′18″N 156°32′21″W
  - elevation: 151 ft (46 m)
- Length: 100 mi (160 km)

The Huslia River is a 100-mile (160 km) tributary of the Koyukuk River in the U.S. state of Alaska. The river begins at the confluence of its north and south forks and flows generally southeast across the Koyukuk National Wildlife Refuge to meet the larger river near the community of Huslia.

== See also ==
- List of rivers of Alaska
