= Bettles Airport =

Public airport in Bettles, Alaska, US

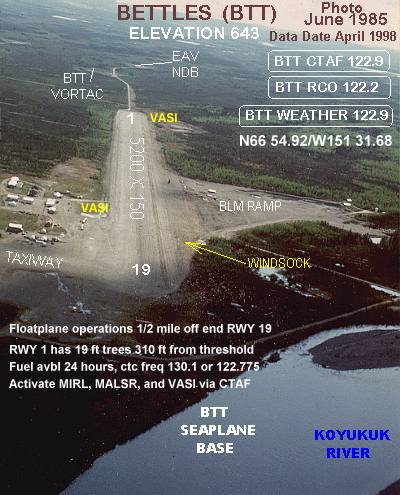
- IATA: BTT; ICAO: PABT; FAA LID: BTT

Summary
- Airport type: Public
- Owner: State of Alaska DOT&PF
- Serves: Bettles, Alaska
- Elevation AMSL: 647 ft (197 m)
- Coordinates: 66°54′50″N 151°31′45″W

Map
- Location of airport in Alaska

Runways
Direction	Length		Surface
Direction	ft	m	Surface
1/19	5,190	1,582	Turf/gravel

Statistics (2015)
- Aircraft operations: 4,150
- Based aircraft: 12
- Passengers: 2,859
- Freight: 237,000 lbs
- Source: Federal Aviation Administration

Bettles Airport (IATA: BTT, ICAO: PABT, FAA LID: BTT) is a state-owned public-use airport located in Bettles, a city in the Yukon-Koyukuk Census Area of the U.S. state of Alaska.

== Facilities and aircraft ==
Bettles Airport covers 1,195 acres 1,195 acres (484 ha) which contains one runway designated 1/19 with a 5,190 x 150 ft (1,582 x 46 m) gravel surface. It also has two seaplane landing areas: 9W/27W which measures 1,500 x 1,200 ft (457 x 366 m) and 18W/36W which measures 2,000 x 1,200 ft (610 x 366 m).

For the 12-month period ending December 31, 2005, the airport had 4,150 aircraft operations, an average of 11 per day: 72% general aviation, 24% air taxi and 4% military. There are 11 aircraft based at this airport: 91% single-engine and 9% multi-engine.

== Airlines and destinations ==
The following airlines offer scheduled passenger service at this airport:

Airlines	Destinations
Wright Air Service	Allakaket, Fairbanks, Hughes

=== Statistics ===
Carrier Shares for August 2021 - July 2022
Carrier	Passengers (arriving and departing)
Wright Air	2,990(100.00%)

Carrier Shares for August 2021 - July 2022
Rank	City	Airport	Passengers
1	(Alaska) Fairbanks	Fairbanks International Airport	2,395
2	(Alaska) Allakaket	Allakaket Airport	5

== Incidents ==
On October 30, 1970, Douglas C-47B N99663 of Frontier Flying Service was written off in a landing accident. The aircraft struck three parked aircraft. It was on a cargo flight from Fairbanks International Airport, Alaska, to Ambler Airport, Alaska via Bettles. All four aircraft were substantially damaged.

== See also ==
- List of airports in Alaska
