= Ruby Airport =

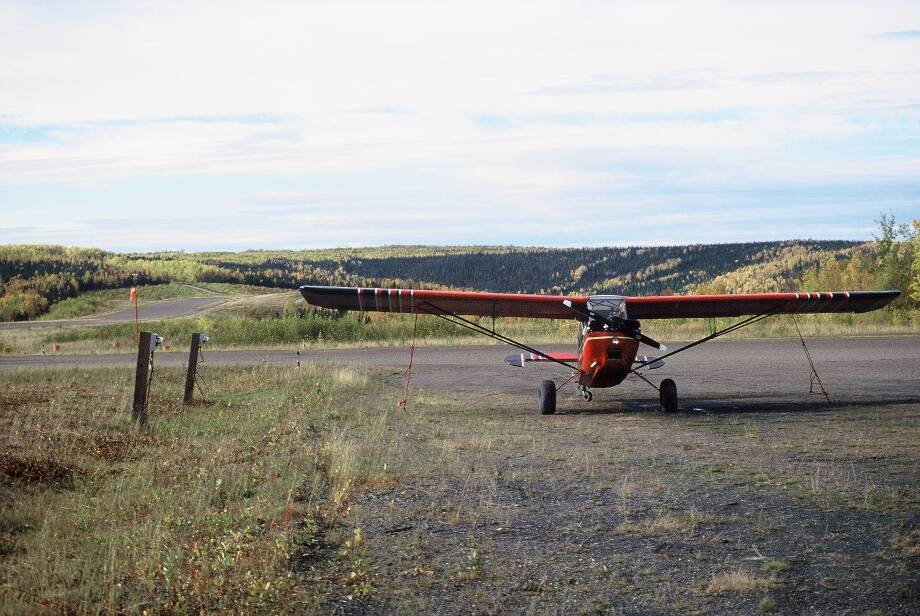
- Piper Cub on runway
- IATA: RBY; ICAO: PARY; FAA LID: RBY

Summary
- Airport type: Public
- Owner: State of Alaska DOT&PF
- Operator: ALASKA DOT&PF NORTHERN REGION
- Serves: Ruby, Alaska
- Time zone: UTC -9 ({{{utc}}})
- Elevation AMSL: 657.5 ft / 200.41 m
- Coordinates: 64°43′38″N 155°28′12″W

Map
- Location of airport in Alaska

Runways
| Direction | Length | | Surface |
| Direction | ft | m | Surface |
|---|---|---|---|
| 3/21 | 4,000 | 1,219.2 | Gravel |

Statistics
- Based aircraft: 2
- Source: Federal Aviation Administration

"Enplanements for CY 2023" (PDF, 14KB). 2023 Passenger Boarding and All-Cargo Data. Federal Aviation Administration. October 2, 2023. Archived (PDF) from the original on 14 March 2025.

Ruby Airport (IATA: RBY, ICAO: PARY, FAA LID: RBY) is a state-owned public-use airport located one nautical mile (1.85 km) southeast of the central business district of Ruby, a city in the Yukon-Koyukuk Census Area of the U.S. state of Alaska.

As per Federal Aviation Administration records, the airport had 1,476 passenger boardings (enplanements) in calendar year 2023 and, 1,305 enplanements in 2022 It is included in the National Plan of Integrated Airport Systems for 2011–2015, which categorized it as a general aviation airport (the commercial service category requires at least 2,500 enplanements per year).

== Facilities ==
Ruby Airport has one runway designated 3/21 with a gravel surface measuring 4,000 by 100 feet (1,219.2 x 30.48 m).

== Airlines and destinations ==
=== Common aircraft types ===
- Cessna Light aircraft
- Cessna 208B

Wright Air Service offers scheduled passenger service at this airport:

| Airlines | Destinations |
|---|---|
| Everts Air | Fairbanks |
| Wright Air Service | Fairbanks, Galena, Huslia, Kaltag, Tanana |

== See also ==
- List of airports in Alaska
