= Koyukon language =

Athabaskan language of North America

Koyukon
- Denaakkenaageʼ, Denaakkʼe, Dinaak̲'a
- Pronunciation: [təˈnæːqʼə]
- Native to: United States
- Region: Alaska (middle Yukon River, Koyukuk River)
- Ethnicity: Koyukon
- Native speakers: 65 (2015 census)
- Language family: Na-Dené: Athabaskan; Northern Athabaskan; Koyukon
- Writing system: Latin

Official status
- Official language in: Alaska

Language codes
- ISO 639-3: koy
- Glottolog: koyu1237
- ELP: Koyukon
- Koyukon is classified as Critically Endangered by the UNESCO Atlas of the World's Languages in Danger.

Koyukon (also called Denaakk'e) is the geographically most widespread Athabascan language spoken in Alaska. The Athabaskan language is spoken along the Koyukuk and the middle Yukon Rivers in western interior Alaska. In 2007, the language had approximately 300 speakers, who were generally older adults and bilingual in English. The total Koyukon ethnic population was 2,300.

== History ==
Jules Jetté, a French Canadian Jesuit missionary, began recording the language and culture of the Koyukon people in 1898. Considered a fluent Koyukon speaker after spending years in the region, Jetté died in 1927. He had made a significant quantity of notes on the Koyukon people, their culture and beliefs, and their language.

Eliza Jones, a Koyukon, came across these manuscripts while studying, and later working, at the University of Alaska in the early 1970s. Working from Jetté's notes and in consultation with Koyukon tribal elders, Jones wrote the Koyukon Athabaskan Dictionary. It was edited by James Kari and published in 2000 by the Alaska Native Language Center at the University of Alaska Fairbanks.

The Koyukon Athabaskan Dictionary is unusually comprehensive in terms of documentation of an American indigenous language, in part because Jetté's notes were of excellent quality and depth. In addition, he wrote about the language and culture nearly a century ago, when the language was far more widely spoken in daily life and the Koyukon people were living in a more traditional way. The use of the word, "Dictionary", in the title is perhaps misleading; the book is more similar to an encyclopedia, as it also is a record of the culture and traditions of the Koyukon people.

The book includes traditional stories recorded by Catherine Attla and published in 1983 by the University of Alaska Fairbanks.

== Dialects ==
As of 1978 there were three Koyukon Language dialects (Lower, Central and Upper). Lower Koyukon was spoken in Kaltag and Nulato; Central Koyukon was spoken on the Yukon River in the villages of Galena, Ruby, Koyukuk and part of Tanana, and on the Koyukuk River in the villages of Huslia, Hughes, and Allakaket; Upper Koyukon was spoken at Stevens Village, Rampart, and part of Tanana.

== Language revitalization ==
In 2012, Susan Pavskan reported:

On Thursday evenings Denaakk'e (Koyukon Athabascan) classes are held at Yukon-Koyukuk School District offices in Fairbanks and Huslia. About 18 people from four generations attended Thursday over video-conference. At the end of class, I demonstrated how MP3 sound files can be imported into iTunes then synced with iPads or iPods. The students demonstrated these to their parents and grandparents.

The children's show Molly of Denali features the Koyukon language.

== Phonology and orthography ==
=== Consonants ===
Sounds are given in IPA with the orthographic equivalent in angled brackets:

Consonant phonemes of Koyukon
		Bilabial	Alveolar			Palatal	Velar	Uvular	Glottal
		Bilabial	Median	Sibilant	Lateral	Palatal	Velar	Uvular	Glottal
Plosive and Affricate	Plain	p ⟨b⟩	t ⟨d⟩	ts ⟨dz⟩	tɬ ⟨dl⟩		k ⟨g⟩	q ⟨gg⟩	ʔ ⟨'⟩
Plosive and Affricate	Aspirated		tʰ ⟨t⟩	tsʰ ⟨ts⟩	tɬʰ ⟨tl⟩		kʰ ⟨k⟩	qʰ ⟨kk⟩	
Plosive and Affricate	Ejective		tʼ	tsʼ	tɬʼ ⟨tl'⟩		kʼ	qʼ ⟨kk'⟩	
Fricative	Voiced			z			ɣ ⟨gh⟩		
Fricative	Voiceless			s			x ⟨h⟩		h ⟨ĥ⟩
Sonorant	Voiced	m	n		l	j ⟨y⟩			
Sonorant	Voiceless		n̥ ⟨nh⟩		l̥ ⟨ł⟩	j̊ ⟨yh⟩			

Plosives and affricates, other than the labial b and the glottal ', distinguish plain, aspirated and ejective forms. Other consonants include labial and alveolar nasals; alveolar, velar and glottal fricatives; and alveolar and palatal approximants. Again other than the labial m and the glottal h, these distinguish forms with and without voice.

=== Vowels ===
Koyukon has four full vowels and four reduced vowels. Note that /æː/ is actually near-open, and /ʊ/ is actually near-close.

	Full		Reduced
	front	back	Reduced
close	iː ⟨ee⟩	uː ⟨oo⟩	ʊ ⟨u⟩
mid			ə ⟨e⟩ (Note: previously ⟨i⟩ and ⟨a⟩)
open	æː ⟨aa⟩	ɔː ⟨o⟩	ɞ ⟨ʉ⟩
