= Bettles, Alaska =

Bettles Kk’odlel T’odegheelenh Denh
- City
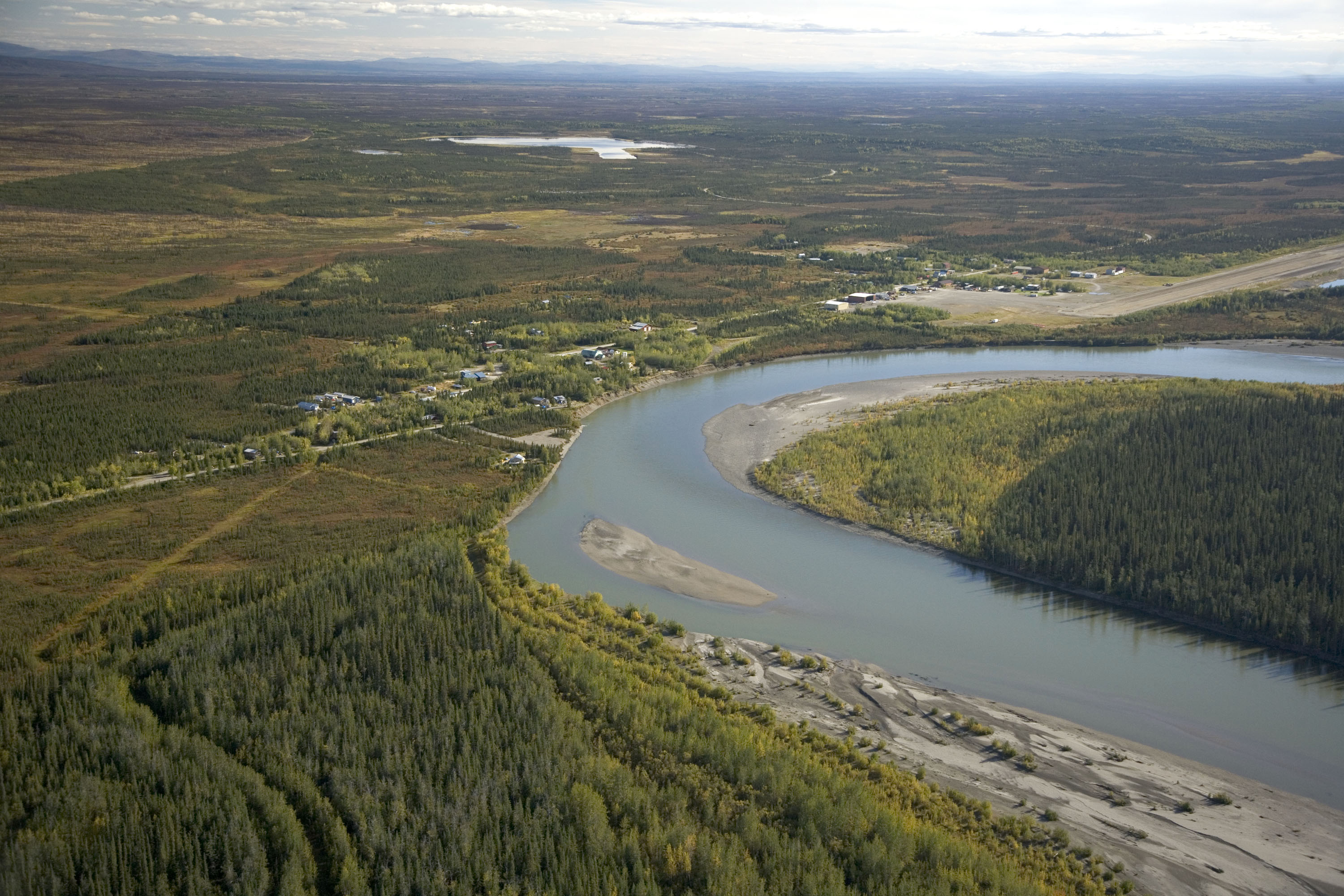
- Aerial view of Bettles (right) and its neighbor Evansville (left)

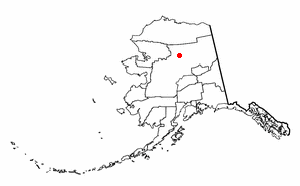
- Location in Alaska
- Coordinates: 66°54′48″N 151°31′21″W
- Country: United States
- State: Alaska
- Census Area: Yukon-Koyukuk
- Incorporated: December 20, 1985

Government
  - Mayor: Richard Thorne
  - State senator: Click Bishop (R)
  - State rep.: Mike Cronk (R)

Area
  - Total: 1.59 sq mi (4.12 km^{2})
  - Land: 1.56 sq mi (4.05 km^{2})
  - Water: 0.027 sq mi (0.07 km^{2}) 0%
- Elevation: 660 ft (200 m)

Population (2020)
  - Total: 23
  - Density: 14.7/sq mi (5.67/km^{2})
- Time zone: UTC−9 (Alaska (AKST))
  - Summer (DST): UTC−8 (AKDT)
- ZIP code: 99726
- Area code: 907
- FIPS code: 02-06630
- GNIS feature ID: 1926949

Bettles (Koyukon: Kk’odlel T’odegheelenh Denh; North Alaskan Inupiatun: Atchiiniq) is a city in Yukon-Koyukuk Census Area, Alaska, United States. It is near Gates of the Arctic National Park and Preserve. The population was 23 at the 2020 census, up from 12 in 2010. It is the second smallest incorporated city in the state.

== History ==
The original village was founded a mile southwest of the junction of the John & Koyukuk Rivers in the late 1890s during the Alaska Gold Rush and was named for Gordon C. Bettles, a newspaper man, Montana Silver prospector, and trader who established the trading post and community in 1898. A post office was established in 1901 and continued intermittently until 1956. Residents began relocating 5 miles (8.0 km) east to Evansville, where the airstrip that serves the community today was built in World War II and is now used for commercial air service. The Hickel Highway was used to transport equipment and supplies to the North Slope for oil exploration, and to build the Dalton Highway, which is now used as a truck route to the oilfields. The old village was largely abandoned and the New Bettles was carved out of Evansville and was incorporated in 1985.

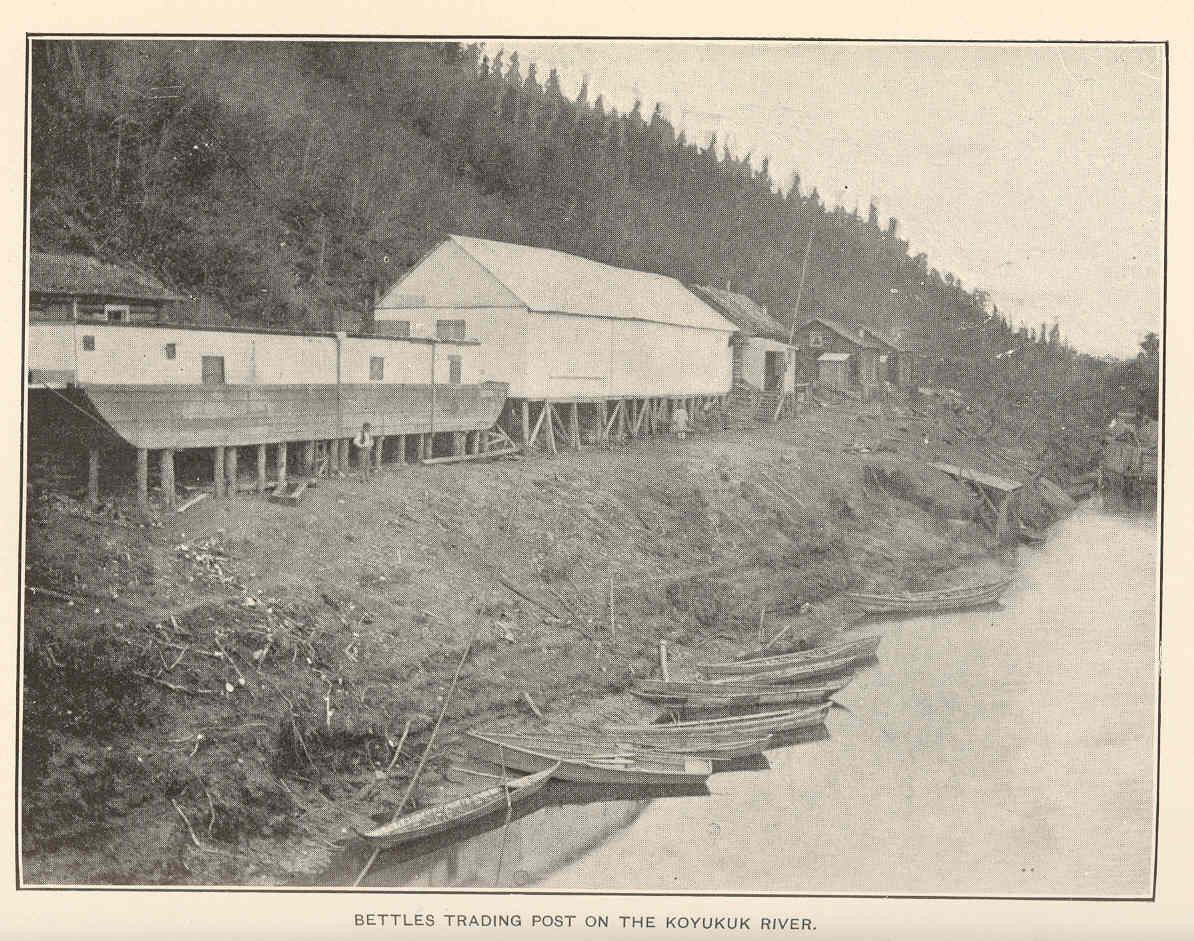
Bettles Trading Post on the Koyukuk River at Old Bettles, Alaska

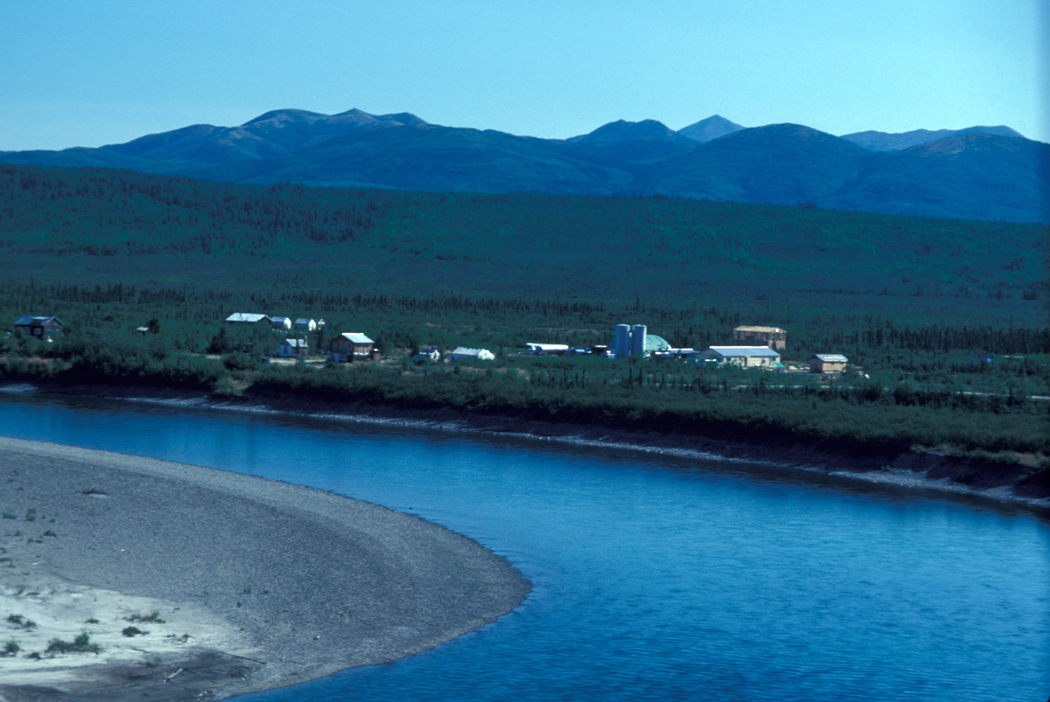
Bettles and the Koyukuk River at (New) Bettles, Alaska, 2003

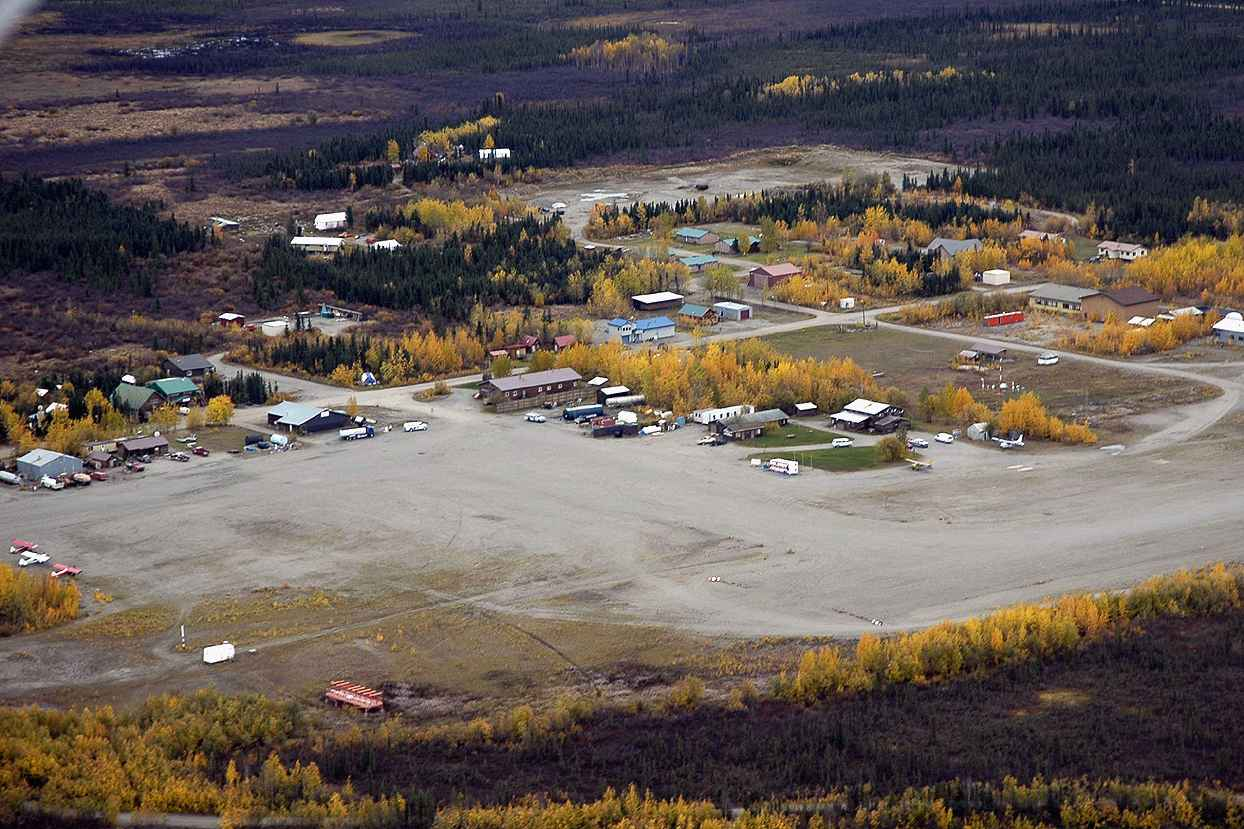
Bettles community from air, (New) Bettles, Alaska, c2013

== Demographics ==
=== Old Bettles (1930–1960) ===
Historical population
Census	Pop.	Note	%±
1930	23		—
1940	10		−56.5%
1950	47		370.0%
1960	77		63.8%
2020	23		—
U.S. Decennial Census

The original village of Bettles first appeared on the 1930 U.S. Census as an unincorporated village. At that time, it was located on the west bank of the Koyukuk River, a mile west of its junction with the John River 66°54′25″N 151°40′59″W. With the construction of the airfield at Evansville 5 miles east, residents began relocating away by the 1940s and the post office closed in 1956. The original village would later be known as "Old Bettles." It would apparently last appear on the 1960 U.S. Census, although it is not entirely clear if the figures for 1950 and 1960 were for the settlement of the old village or for the new settlement around the airstrip in Evansville. It was reported the last residents left the old village in 1997, though several buildings still remained as of two decades later.

=== New Bettles (1990–present) ===
Historical population
Census	Pop.	Note	%±
1990	36		—
2000	43		19.4%
2010	12		−72.1%
2020	23		91.7%
U.S. Decennial Census

The present day city of "New" Bettles is about 5 miles east of the old settlement surrounding the Bettles Airstrip and was originally known as Evansville. It is located on the south bank of the Koyukuk River and east of where the John River flows into it. 66°55′08″N 151°30′58″W. Although the area began to be settled around World War II with the construction of the airfield, it was not entirely clear if the population figures for 1950 and 1960 were for the "New" Bettles or the old village, which still was occupied until 1997. When Bettles ceased to report after the 1960 census, the area around the airfield reported as the unincorporated village of Evansville on the 1970 census and as a census-designated place on the 1980 census. In 1985, a section of unincorporated Evansville was carved out and incorporated as the city of Bettles, and it has appeared on the U.S. Census again beginning in 1990.

=== 2020 census ===
As of the 2020 census, Bettles had a population of 23. The median age was 48.5 years. 21.7% of residents were under the age of 18 and 17.4% of residents were 65 years of age or older. For every 100 females there were 91.7 males, and for every 100 females age 18 and over there were 100.0 males age 18 and over.

0.0% of residents lived in urban areas, while 100.0% lived in rural areas.

There were 10 households in Bettles, of which 10.0% had children under the age of 18 living in them. Of all households, 40.0% were married-couple households, 40.0% were households with a male householder and no spouse or partner present, and 10.0% were households with a female householder and no spouse or partner present. About 50.0% of all households were made up of individuals and 0.0% had someone living alone who was 65 years of age or older.

There were 40 housing units, of which 75.0% were vacant. The homeowner vacancy rate was 0.0% and the rental vacancy rate was 52.9%.

Racial composition as of the 2020 census
Race	Number	Percent
White	17	73.9%
Black or African American	0	0.0%
American Indian and Alaska Native	4	17.4%
Asian	0	0.0%
Native Hawaiian and Other Pacific Islander	0	0.0%
Some other race	0	0.0%
Two or more races	2	8.7%
Hispanic or Latino (of any race)	1	4.3%

=== 2010 census ===
As of the 2010 census, the population was 12.

=== 2000 census ===
As of the census of 2000, there were 43 people, 16 households, and 9 families residing in the city. The population density was 26.2 people per square mile (10.1 per km^{2}). There were 36 housing units at an average density of 21.9/sq mi (8.5 per km^{2}). The racial makeup of the city was 76.74% White, 18.60% Native American, and 4.65% from two or more races.

There were 16 households, out of which 37.5% had children under the age of 18 living with them, 50.0% were married couples living together, 6.3% had a female householder with no husband present, and 43.8% were non-families. 18.8% of all households were made up of individuals, and none had someone living alone who was 65 years of age or older. The average household size was 2.69 and the average family size was 3.44.

In the city, the population was spread out, with 30.2% under the age of 18, 7.0% from 18 to 24, 37.2% from 25 to 44, 25.6% from 45 to 64. The median age was 34 years. For every 100 females, there were 104.8 males. For every 100 females age 18 and over, there were 130.8 males.

The median income for a household in the city was $49,375, and the median income for a family was $65,000. Males had a median income of $47,917 versus $48,750 for females. The per capita income for the city was $19,585. There were 10.0% of families and 6.4% of the population living below the poverty line, including 11.1% of under eighteens and none of those over 64.

== Geography ==
Bettles is located on the southeast bank of the Koyukuk River at 66°54′48″N 151°31′21″W (66.913419, −151.522374). The city is on the former Hickel Highway, that now connects to the Dalton Highway as a winter ice road only and crosses the Jim River. Bettles is 35 miles (56 km) north of the Arctic Circle, just south of the Brooks Range. The city is also served by a 5,190-foot (1,580 m) gravel airstrip built by the military.

According to the United States Census Bureau, the city has a total area of 1.6 square miles (4.1 km^{2}), all of it land.

=== Climate ===
As is typical of the Alaska Interior, Bettles experiences a subarctic climate (Köppen Dfc) with very long, frigid winters and short, warm summers, and is located in USDA Plant Hardiness Zone 1, indicating the coldest temperature of the year is typically at or below −50 °F (−46 °C). Temperatures usually remain consistently below freezing from late October to late March, and the bulk of the year's snow occurs from October to April, with generally light accumulations in May and September; the average annual snowfall stands at 91 inches (2.31 m). In summer, temperatures reach 70 °F (21 °C) on 37 days and 80 °F (27 °C) on 6.4, with an average of 1 night not falling below 60 °F (16 °C). The threat of frost usually begins in late August, but sometimes it can happen during the first half of that month. A majority of the annual precipitation of 14.9 inches (378 mm) occurs during summer as well. Extreme temperatures have ranged from −70 °F (−57 °C), recorded on January 4, 1975, up to 93 °F (34 °C), set on July 6, 1986.

Climate data for Bettles Airport, Alaska (1991–2020 normals, (Note: Mean monthly maxima and minima (i.e. the highest and lowest temperature readings during an entire month or year) calculated based on data at said location from 1991 to 2020.) extremes 1944–present)
Month	Jan	Feb	Mar	Apr	May	Jun	Jul	Aug	Sep	Oct	Nov	Dec	Year
Record high °F (°C)	42 (6)	40 (4)	49 (9)	66 (19)	86 (30)	92 (33)	93 (34)	88 (31)	79 (26)	59 (15)	45 (7)	38 (3)	93 (34)
Mean maximum °F (°C)	26.1 (−3.3)	29.7 (−1.3)	35.1 (1.7)	51.9 (11.1)	73.5 (23.1)	82.5 (28.1)	83.7 (28.7)	75.9 (24.4)	64.5 (18.1)	45.2 (7.3)	28.5 (−1.9)	26.4 (−3.1)	85.0 (29.4)
Mean daily maximum °F (°C)	−2.4 (−19.1)	6.5 (−14.2)	16.6 (−8.6)	35.9 (2.2)	55.7 (13.2)	69.9 (21.1)	70.2 (21.2)	62.6 (17.0)	49.8 (9.9)	28.4 (−2.0)	7.6 (−13.6)	1.9 (−16.7)	33.6 (0.9)
Daily mean °F (°C)	−10.6 (−23.7)	−3.4 (−19.7)	3.7 (−15.7)	24.6 (−4.1)	45.0 (7.2)	58.6 (14.8)	59.8 (15.4)	52.7 (11.5)	41.2 (5.1)	21.3 (−5.9)	0.3 (−17.6)	−6.0 (−21.1)	23.9 (−4.5)
Mean daily minimum °F (°C)	−18.9 (−28.3)	−13.3 (−25.2)	−9.2 (−22.9)	13.2 (−10.4)	34.2 (1.2)	47.3 (8.5)	49.4 (9.7)	42.7 (5.9)	32.6 (0.3)	14.3 (−9.8)	−7.0 (−21.7)	−13.9 (−25.5)	14.3 (−9.8)
Mean minimum °F (°C)	−50.1 (−45.6)	−40.6 (−40.3)	−33.2 (−36.2)	−13.5 (−25.3)	18.0 (−7.8)	36.0 (2.2)	38.8 (3.8)	28.9 (−1.7)	17.2 (−8.2)	−9.9 (−23.3)	−31.4 (−35.2)	−42.4 (−41.3)	−53.4 (−47.4)
Record low °F (°C)	−70 (−57)	−64 (−53)	−56 (−49)	−39 (−39)	−10 (−23)	27 (−3)	29 (−2)	15 (−9)	0 (−18)	−35 (−37)	−57 (−49)	−60 (−51)	−70 (−57)
Average precipitation inches (mm)	0.87 (22)	0.96 (24)	0.61 (15)	0.60 (15)	0.89 (23)	1.46 (37)	2.32 (59)	2.71 (69)	2.13 (54)	1.17 (30)	1.15 (29)	1.14 (29)	16.01 (407)
Average snowfall inches (cm)	14.0 (36)	15.9 (40)	9.3 (24)	5.2 (13)	1.0 (2.5)	0.0 (0.0)	0.0 (0.0)	0.0 (0.0)	3.2 (8.1)	12.0 (30)	19.1 (49)	18.2 (46)	97.9 (249)
Average precipitation days (≥ 0.01 in)	9.1	9.9	7.8	6.2	8.6	11.4	13.4	15.2	12.9	12.4	10.4	11.2	128.5
Average snowy days (≥ 0.1 in)	10.3	10.9	8.6	5.0	1.3	0.0	0.0	0.0	2.5	11.0	11.4	12.5	73.5
Average relative humidity (%)	68.6	67.0	65.3	67.2	60.7	59.8	67.7	75.8	75.6	77.7	73.5	71.7	69.2
Average dew point °F (°C)	−17.3 (−27.4)	−16.1 (−26.7)	−6.5 (−21.4)	11.8 (−11.2)	29.7 (−1.3)	42.4 (5.8)	47.8 (8.8)	45.0 (7.2)	32.5 (0.3)	12.7 (−10.7)	−7.4 (−21.9)	−15.5 (−26.4)	13.3 (−10.4)
Source: NOAA (relative humidity and dew point 1961–1990)

== Education ==
The community was previously served by the Bettles Field School of the Yukon–Koyukuk School District.

== Transportation ==
Bettles Airport's commercial and freight airline service is provided by Wright Air Service, with daily service to and from Fairbanks and other communities. The Vor Lake Waterlane seaplane base is located 2.5 miles (4.0 km) south of the city.

== Notable people ==
- Aliy Zirkle (born 1970), sled dog racer
- Otto W. Geist (1888–1963), archaeologist, explorer, naturalist
