= Allakaket, Alaska =

City in Alaska, United States

Allakaket Aalaa Kkaakk’et
- City
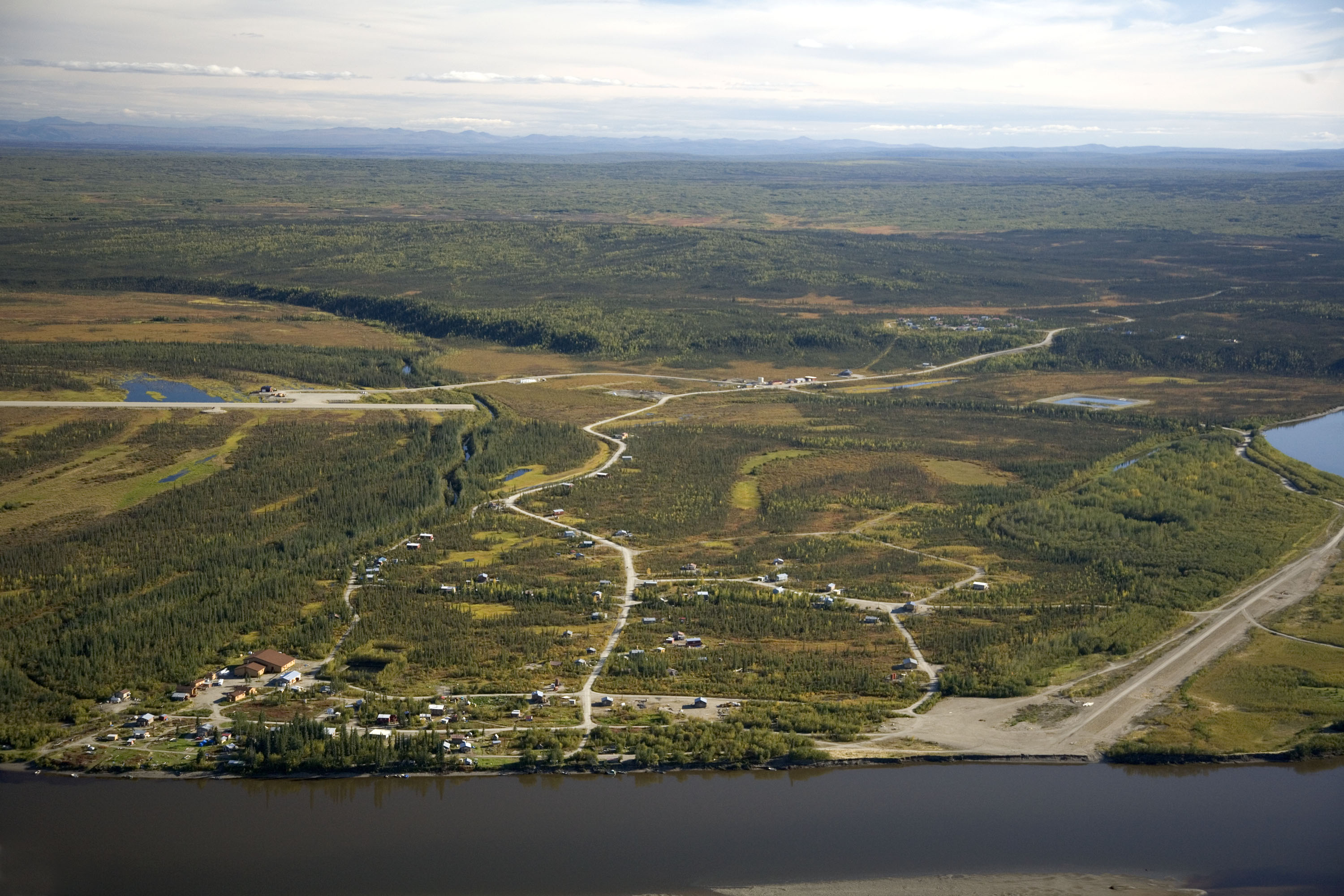
- Aerial view of Allakaket

- Location in Alaska
- Coordinates: 66°33′48″N 152°38′50″W
- Country: United States
- State: Alaska
- Census Area: Yukon-Koyukuk
- Incorporated: 1975

Government
  - Mayor: Valerie Bergman
  - State senator: Click Bishop (R)
  - State rep.: Mike Cronk (R)

Area
  - Total: 17.03 sq mi (44.12 km^{2})
  - Land: 14.72 sq mi (38.12 km^{2})
  - Water: 2.32 sq mi (6.00 km^{2})
- Elevation: 400 ft (122 m)

Population (2020)
  - Total: 177
  - Density: 12.0/sq mi (4.64/km^{2})
- Time zone: UTC-9 (Alaska (AKST))
  - Summer (DST): UTC-8 (AKDT)
- ZIP code: 99720
- Area code: 907
- FIPS code: 02-01860
- GNIS feature ID: 1398129
- Website: AK Municipal League listing

Allakaket (/æləˈkækɪt/ al-ə-KAK-it; Koyukon: Aalaa Kkaakk’et) is a second class city in the Yukon-Koyukuk Census Area of the Unorganized Borough of the U.S. state of Alaska. The population was 177 at the 2020 census.

== History and culture ==
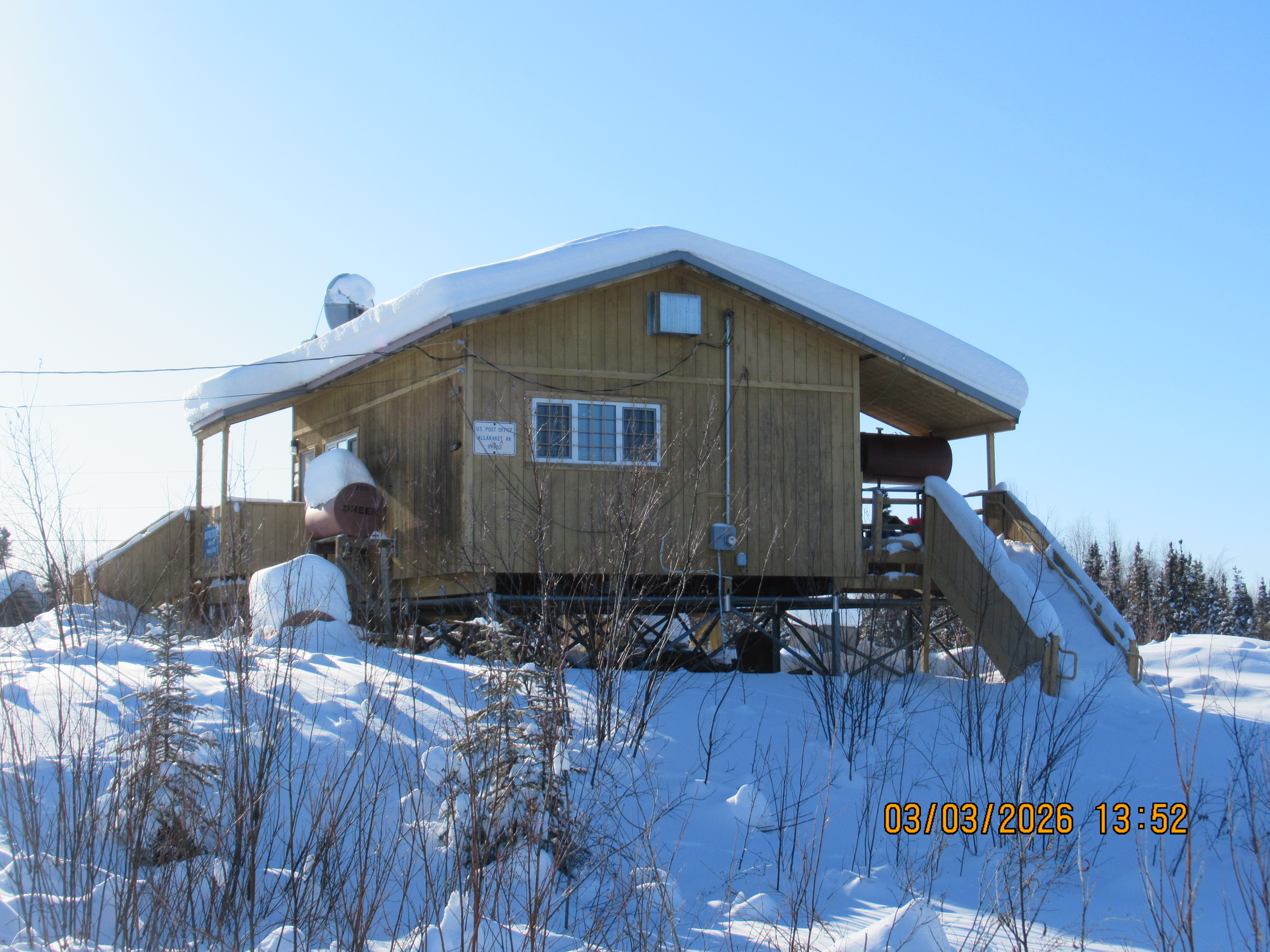
Allakaket Post Office, as seen in 2026

Several Native groups have lived in the area, including Koyukon Athabascans and Kobuk, Selawik, and Nunamiut Eskimos from the north and northwest. The Koyukon lived in several camps throughout the year, moving as the seasons changed, following the wild game and fish. The various bands established joint settlements after 1851. The old site of Alatna was a traditional trading center for Athabascans and Eskimos.

The first mission on the Koyukuk River, St. John's-in-the-Wilderness Episcopal Mission, was established in 1906. A post office was opened in 1925. In 1938, the name of the community was changed to Allakaket (the old name for the mission), and the name Alatna was assumed by the small Eskimo community across the river. The first public school was established in 1957. A flood caused by ice jamming inundated 85% of the community in the Spring of 1964. In 1975, the community incorporated as a City, including both settlements of Allakaket and Alatna. A clinic and airport were built in 1978. A new school and community roads were built in 1979. In September 1994, flood waters destroyed and swept away nearly all of the community's buildings, homes, and food caches for the winter. Residents rebuilt near the old City site, but some new homes and facilities are now located outside of the incorporated City boundaries. New Allakaket and Alatna are located outside of the City limits.

A federally recognized tribe is located in the community—the Allakaket Village. The population of the community consists of 95.9% Alaska Native or part Native. Allakaket is mainly an Athabascan community; Kobuk Eskimos live across the river in Alatna. Two separate village councils exist. Traditional potlatches, dances and foot races attract visitors from area villages. Subsistence activities provide the majority of food sources. The sale, importation and possession of alcohol are banned in the village.

== Geography ==
Allakaket is located in the Fairbanks Recording District.

Allakaket is on the south bank of the Koyukuk River, southwest of its junction with the Alatna River, approximately 190 miles (310 km) northwest of Fairbanks and 57 miles (92 km) upriver from Hughes. The village of Alatna is located directly across the river.

According to the United States Census Bureau, the city has a total area of 4.3 square miles (11 km^{2}), of which, 3.6 square miles (9.3 km^{2}) of it is land and 0.7 square miles (1.8 km^{2}) of it (17.05%) is water.

=== Climate ===
Allakaket has a subarctic climate (Köppen Dfc) characterized by frigid, snowy winters and mild summers. The average high temperature during July is 70 °F or 21.1 °C. Temperatures in January fall to or below 0 °F or −17.8 °C on all but four mornings, and during December and February on all but six per month, whilst extended periods below −40 °F or −40 °C are common: the coldest month on record of January 1971 averaged −44.9 °F (−42.7 °C). Being further from the Alaska Range than Fairbanks, Allakaket is less influenced by warming chinook winds, so that temperatures have topped freezing in January only six times on record, and in December only ten times of record.

The highest temperature ever recorded was 94 °F (34.4 °C) and the lowest was −75 °F (−59.4 °C). Average precipitation is 12.41 inches or 315.2 millimetres and annual snowfall is 61.3 inches or 1.56 metres. The Koyukuk River is ice-free from June through October.

Climate data for Allakaket (1961–1990 normals, extremes 1907–1982)
Month	Jan	Feb	Mar	Apr	May	Jun	Jul	Aug	Sep	Oct	Nov	Dec	Year
Record high °F (°C)	49 (9)	45 (7)	45 (7)	65 (18)	83 (28)	92 (33)	94 (34)	88 (31)	82 (28)	55 (13)	43 (6)	39 (4)	94 (34)
Mean maximum °F (°C)	22.7 (−5.2)	23.2 (−4.9)	34.6 (1.4)	48.3 (9.1)	69.7 (20.9)	79.8 (26.6)	83.8 (28.8)	79.1 (26.2)	63.6 (17.6)	43.8 (6.6)	29.9 (−1.2)	25.8 (−3.4)	85.2 (29.6)
Mean daily maximum °F (°C)	−10.9 (−23.8)	−3.9 (−19.9)	13.5 (−10.3)	33.0 (0.6)	53.0 (11.7)	67.2 (19.6)	70.3 (21.3)	65.0 (18.3)	50.2 (10.1)	27.3 (−2.6)	4.5 (−15.3)	−6.4 (−21.3)	30.3 (−0.9)
Daily mean °F (°C)	−21.2 (−29.6)	−18.3 (−27.9)	−4.0 (−20.0)	18.1 (−7.7)	41.8 (5.4)	55.1 (12.8)	58.0 (14.4)	52.0 (11.1)	38.4 (3.6)	18.0 (−7.8)	−6.6 (−21.4)	−17.1 (−27.3)	17.9 (−7.8)
Mean daily minimum °F (°C)	−31.0 (−35.0)	−30.6 (−34.8)	−20.2 (−29.0)	3.5 (−15.8)	28.8 (−1.8)	42.0 (5.6)	44.6 (7.0)	38.3 (3.5)	26.7 (−2.9)	8.1 (−13.3)	−16.7 (−27.1)	−29.2 (−34.0)	5.4 (−14.8)
Mean minimum °F (°C)	−58.2 (−50.1)	−59.5 (−50.8)	−48.4 (−44.7)	−24.0 (−31.1)	12.9 (−10.6)	29.8 (−1.2)	32.7 (0.4)	24.8 (−4.0)	12.5 (−10.8)	−17.7 (−27.6)	−44.8 (−42.7)	−56.1 (−48.9)	−61.6 (−52.0)
Record low °F (°C)	−75 (−59)	−70 (−57)	−68 (−56)	−45 (−43)	−17 (−27)	17 (−8)	21 (−6)	17 (−8)	−4 (−20)	−41 (−41)	−61 (−52)	−69 (−56)	−75 (−59)
Average precipitation inches (mm)	0.92 (23)	0.60 (15)	0.40 (10)	0.44 (11)	0.55 (14)	1.14 (29)	1.77 (45)	2.02 (51)	1.24 (31)	1.40 (36)	1.19 (30)	0.84 (21)	12.50 (318)
Average snowfall inches (cm)	11.6 (29)	5.3 (13)	7.4 (19)	5.5 (14)	0.3 (0.76)	0.0 (0.0)	0.0 (0.0)	0.0 (0.0)	1.6 (4.1)	10.4 (26)	7.5 (19)	3.7 (9.4)	53.3 (135)
Average precipitation days	3.8	4.5	3.9	6.0	5.8	8.9	10.3	12.3	9.1	8.8	5.6	6.4	85.4
Average snowy days (≥ 0.01 inch)	4.4	2.7	2.4	4.3	0.3	0.0	0.0	0.0	0.4	5.4	3.5	1.8	25.2
Source 1: WRCC
Source 2: XMACIS (snowfall)

== Demographics ==
Historical population
Census	Pop.	Note	%±
1920	85		—
1940	105		—
1950	79		−24.8%
1960	115		45.6%
1980	163		—
1990	170		4.3%
2000	97		−42.9%
2010	105		8.2%
2020	177		68.6%
U.S. Decennial Census

Allakaket first appeared on the 1920 U.S. Census as an unincorporated native village. In 1930, it and neighboring Alatna (1/2 mile west across the Yukon River) were combined (under Alatna's name) for a total of 131 (given Alatna's population was between 28 and 32 persons from 1920 to 1950, it can be estimated that Allakaket's population was about 100 for that census). Allakaket was formally incorporated in 1975, including the village of Alatna across the river. Following flooding in 1994, the residents of the Alatna portion on the western side of the Yukon River relocated to higher ground to the west, just outside of city boundaries. As a result, in 2000, Alatna was declared a new census-designated place (CDP), separate from the city of Allakaket.

=== 2020 census ===
As of the 2020 census, Allakaket had a population of 177. The median age was 33.3 years. 31.6% of residents were under the age of 18 and 13.6% of residents were 65 years of age or older.

For every 100 females, there were 139.2 males, and for every 100 females age 18 and over there were 152.1 males age 18 and over.

0.0% of residents lived in urban areas, while 100.0% lived in rural areas.

There were 71 households in Allakaket, of which 26.8% had children under the age of 18 living in them. Of all households, 26.8% were married-couple households, 38.0% were households with a male householder and no spouse or partner present, and 19.7% were households with a female householder and no spouse or partner present. About 40.8% of all households were made up of individuals and 15.5% had someone living alone who was 65 years of age or older.

There were 90 housing units, of which 21.1% were vacant. The homeowner vacancy rate was 0.0% and the rental vacancy rate was 10.3%.

Racial composition as of the 2020 census
Race	Number	Percent
White	20	11.3%
Black or African American	0	0.0%
American Indian and Alaska Native	149	84.2%
Asian	1	0.6%
Native Hawaiian and Other Pacific Islander	0	0.0%
Some other race	0	0.0%
Two or more races	7	4.0%
Hispanic or Latino (of any race)	0	0.0%

=== 2000 census ===
As of the census of 2000, there were 97 people, 41 households, and 18 families residing in the city. The population density was 27.0 inhabitants per square mile (10.4/km^{2}). There were 59 housing units at an average density of 16.4 units per square mile (6.3 units/km^{2}). The racial makeup of the city was 4.12% White, and 95.88% Native American.

There were 41 households, out of which 26.8% had children under the age of 18 living with them, 31.7% were married couples living together, 7.3% had a female householder with no husband present, and 53.7% were non-families. 53.7% of all households were made up of individuals, and 2.4% had someone living alone who was 65 years of age or older. The average household size was 2.37 and the average family size was 3.68.

In the city, the age distribution of the population shows 23.7% under the age of 18, 19.6% from 18 to 24, 22.7% from 25 to 44, 25.8% from 45 to 64, and 8.2% who were 65 years of age or older. The median age was 32 years. For every 100 females, there were 142.5 males. For every 100 females age 18 and over, there were 155.2 males.

The median income for a household in the city was $16,563, and the median income for a family was $33,125. Males had a median income of $13,750 versus $35,417 for females. The per capita income for the city was $10,912. There were 11.8% of families and 12.9% of the population living below the poverty line, including 12.5% of under eighteens and none of those over 64.

== Public services ==
Most public facilities were severely damaged in the 1994 Koyukuk River flood. Major components have been replaced—a new washeteria, well and treatment plant, 100,000 US gallons (380,000 L) water storage tank, sewage lagoon, and force main have recently been completed. The lagoon is connected to the washeteria and school. Residents carry treated water and haul honeybuckets or use pit privies; no households have plumbing. Infrastructure improvements to provide a flush/haul system are continuing. A new landfill and access road are also under construction. Electricity is provided by Alaska Power Company. There is one school located in the community, attended by 52 students. Local hospitals or health clinics include Allakaket Health Clinic (907-968-2248). Allakaket Health Clinic is a Primary Health Care facility. Allakaket is classified as an isolated village; it is found in EMS Region 1C in the Interior Region. Emergency Services have river and air access. Emergency service is provided by a health aide.

The Yukon–Koyukuk School District operates the Allakaket School.

== Economy and transportation ==
Most cash jobs are part-time or seasonal. The primary year-round employers are the school, City, Tribe and village corporation store. Construction and BLM emergency firefighting provide summer jobs. A few earn income from trapping or selling traditional Native handicrafts. Subsistence is the focus of the local economy. Salmon, whitefish, moose, bear, small game and berries provide most food sources. Caribou are taken when available.

Allakaket has no road link, but winter snow machine trails connect it with Hughes, Bettles and Tanana. Allakaket is connected to other communities via the Koyukuk River, a tributary of the Yukon River. The town is accessible once per year by Ruby Marine Barge Service depending on weather and river flow rates. The state-owned Allakaket Airport has a 4,000 by 100 ft (1,219 by 30 m) gravel runway and is accessible year-round. A $6 million airport improvement began construction in 1997. Arctic Circle Air Service, Servant Air, Warbelow's Air Ventures, and Wright Air Service offer passenger flight service.

Allakaket does not impose taxes on real estate, or from other sources.

== Notable people ==
- Jay Ramras (born 1964), businessman, politician
