= Tanana, Alaska =

City in the Yukon-Koyukuk Census Area in Alaska, United States

Tanana Hohudodetlaatl Denh
- City
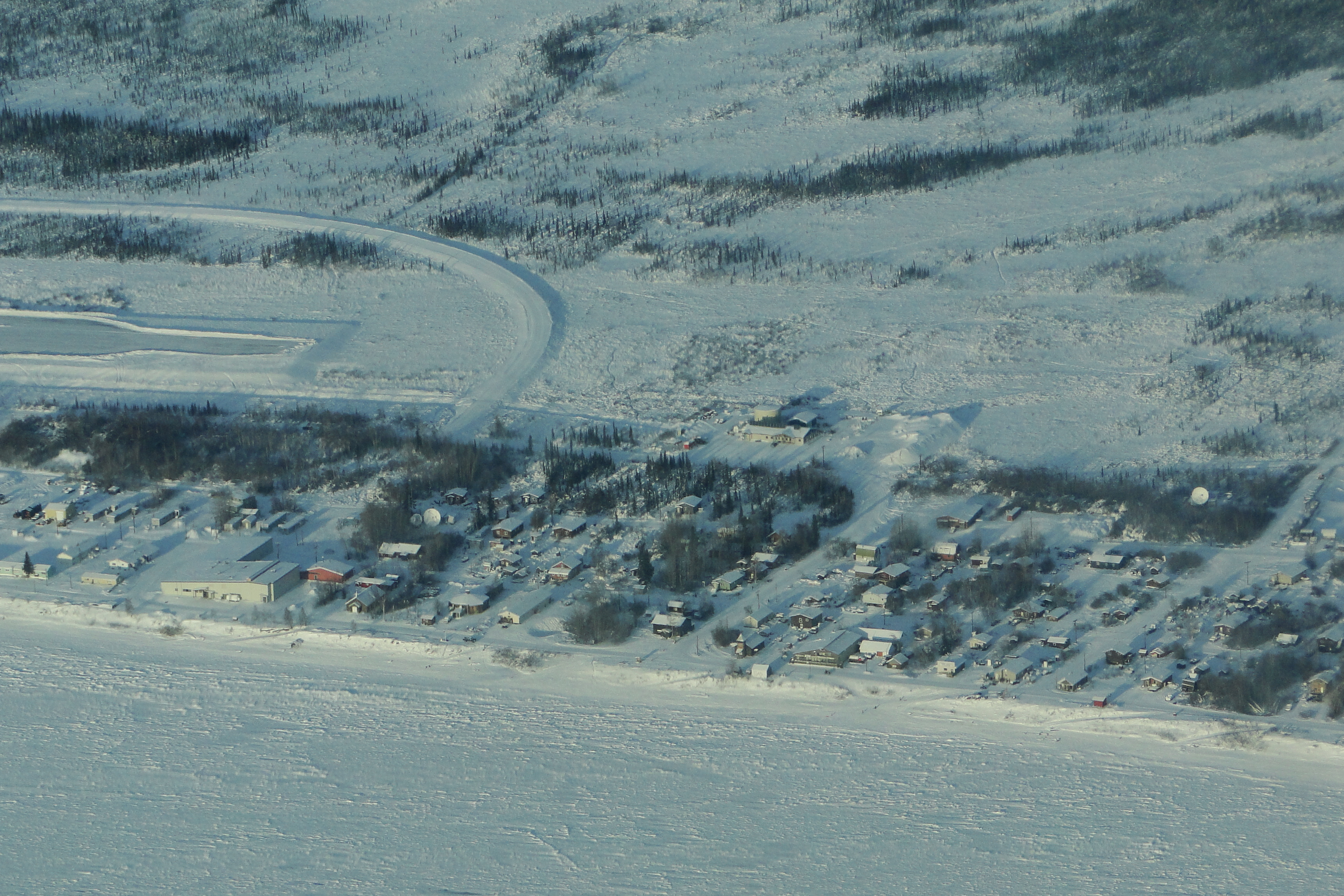
- Aerial view of Tanana

- Location in Alaska
- Coordinates: 65°10′14″N 152°4′33″W
- Country: United States
- State: Alaska
- Census Area: Yukon-Koyukuk
- Incorporated: June 7, 1961

Government
  - Mayor: Donna Folger
  - State senator: Click Bishop (R)
  - State rep.: Mike Cronk (R)

Area
  - Total: 15.00 sq mi (38.84 km^{2})
  - Land: 10.67 sq mi (27.64 km^{2})
  - Water: 4.33 sq mi (11.21 km^{2})
- Elevation: 207 ft (63 m)

Population (2020)
  - Total: 246
  - Density: 23/sq mi (8.9/km^{2})
- Time zone: UTC-9 (Alaska (AKST))
  - Summer (DST): UTC-8 (AKDT)
- ZIP code: 99777
- Area code: 907
- FIPS code: 02-75160

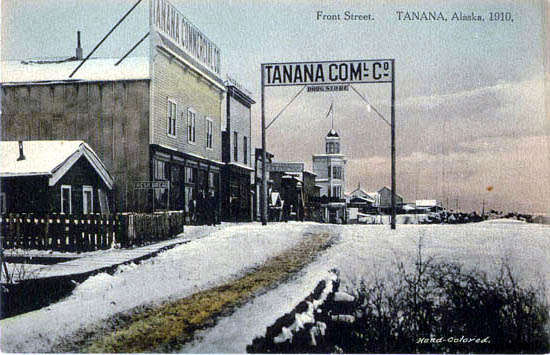
Postcard: Front Street, Tanana, 1910

Tanana /ˈtænənɑː/ (Hohudodetlaatl Denh in Koyukon) is a city in the Yukon-Koyukuk Census Area in the U.S. state of Alaska. As of the 2020 census, Tanana had a population of 246. It was formerly known as Clachotin, adopted by Canadian French.

Jules Jetté (1864–1927), a Jesuit missionary who worked in the area and documented the language, recorded the Koyukon Athabascan name for the village as Hohudodetlaatl Denh, literally, ‘where the area has been chopped’. Several residents are chronicled in the 2012 Discovery Channel TV series Yukon Men. Almost 80% of the town's population are Native Americans, traditionally Koyukon (Denaakk'e) speakers of the large Athabaskan (Dené) language family.

== History ==
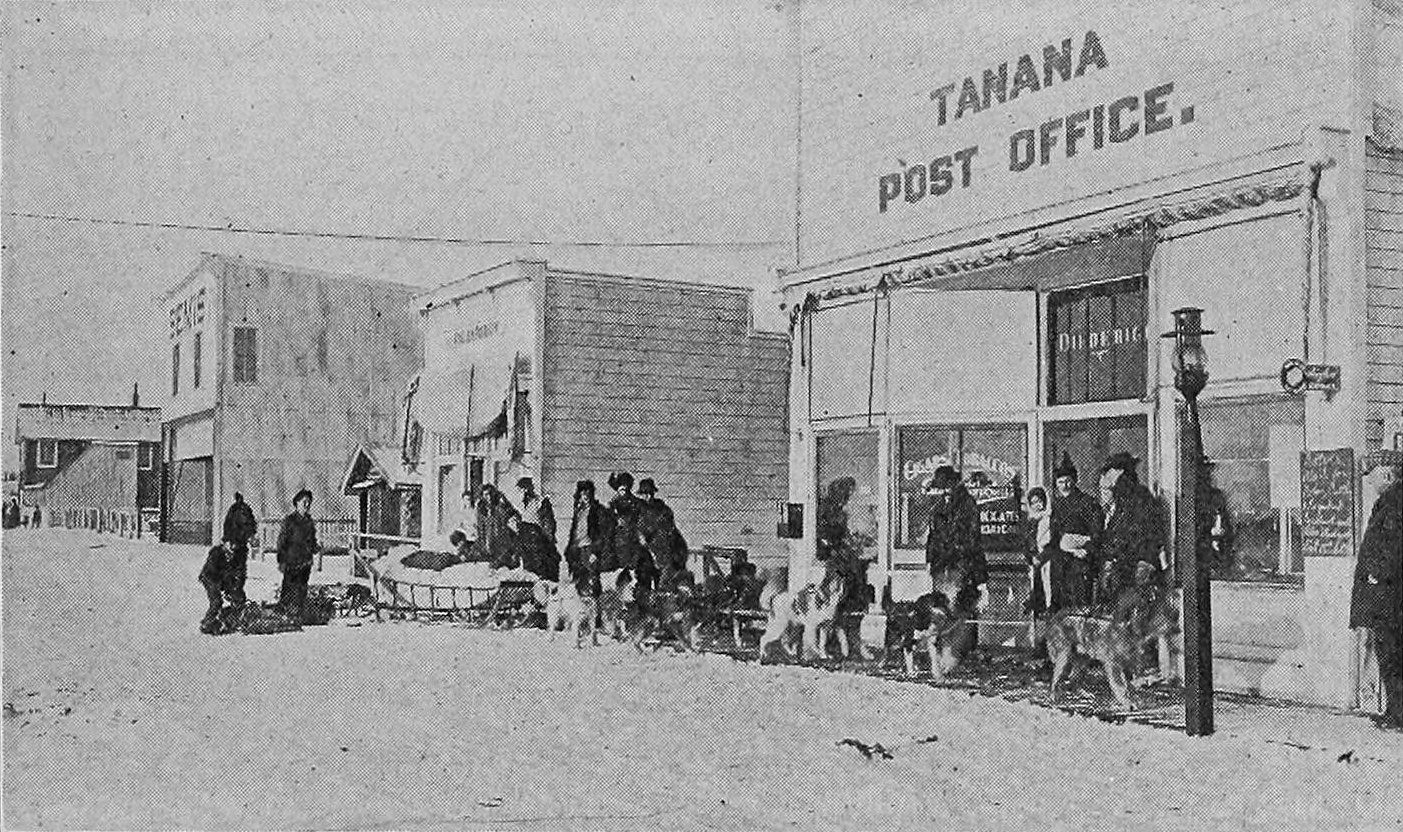
Arrival of mail, 1920

Prior to arrival of settlers in early 1860, the point of land at the confluence of the Tanana and Yukon Rivers (Nuchalawoyyet, spelled differently in historical accounts) was a traditional meeting and trading place used by members of several indigenous groups. There were as many as five different Athabascan languages spoken in the area in 1868 when the French-Canadian François Xavier Mercier established the first fur-trading post in the area. Noukelakayet Station, later known as Fort Adams, was located on the north bank of the Yukon, about 15 miles (24 km) downstream from the mouth of the Tanana River.

Subsequently, an Anglican mission and several other trading posts were established nearby. In 1898 the U.S. Army, under the leadership of Capt. P.H. Ray, founded Ft. Gibbon at the present location of Tanana. Ft. Gibbon's purpose was to oversee shipping and trading, maintain civil order, and install and take care of telegraph lines connecting to Nome and to Tanana Crossing, on the way to Valdez. All other Euro-American activities in the area near the Tanana-Yukon confluence moved upriver to accommodate Ft. Gibbon and the increased steamboat traffic caused by gold seekers. St. James Church moved to the present site of Tanana to serve the Euro-American population, and the Mission of Our Savior was constructed at the bottom of a hill opposite the confluence. The mission site became a center of activity for indigenous people in the area. Ft. Gibbon closed in 1923, but the town and mission remained.

In the 1930s a regional hospital was built in Tanana, and the Native Village of Tanana was officially chartered by the U.S. Bureau of Indian Affairs in 1939. The hospital served people throughout most of the rural northern regions of Alaska until 1982. During World War II Tanana's airfield was one of the stops for aircraft en route to Russia as part of the Lend-Lease program. Postwar, a White Alice communications site was built on a hill nine miles (14 km) behind Tanana, as a part of the Cold War Era's Distant Early Warning system (DEW-Line). Also during the 1950s the mission closed and the indigenous families still living at the mission site moved down to the main town.

== Geography and climate ==
Tanana is located at the confluence of the tributary Tanana and the Yukon River.

According to the United States Census Bureau, the city has a total area of 15.6 square miles (40 km^{2}), of which 11.6 square miles (30 km^{2}) of it is land and 4.0 square miles (10 km^{2}) of it, or 25.80%, is water.

Tanana is about 130 miles (210 km) west of Fairbanks. Extreme temperatures have ranged from −76 °F (−60 °C) on January 27, 1989, to 94 °F (34 °C) as recently as June 15, 1969.

Climate data for Tanana, Alaska (1991–2020 normals, extremes 1901–present)
Month	Jan	Feb	Mar	Apr	May	Jun	Jul	Aug	Sep	Oct	Nov	Dec	Year
Record high °F (°C)	43 (6)	45 (7)	60 (16)	70 (21)	89 (32)	94 (34)	92 (33)	90 (32)	78 (26)	66 (19)	45 (7)	46 (8)	94 (34)
Mean maximum °F (°C)	25.6 (−3.6)	29.5 (−1.4)	37.4 (3.0)	56.4 (13.6)	75.4 (24.1)	83.1 (28.4)	84.1 (28.9)	77.7 (25.4)	64.9 (18.3)	48.0 (8.9)	29.1 (−1.6)	23.7 (−4.6)	85.5 (29.7)
Mean daily maximum °F (°C)	−1.2 (−18.4)	8.2 (−13.2)	18.9 (−7.3)	39.3 (4.1)	58.9 (14.9)	70.1 (21.2)	70.8 (21.6)	63.9 (17.7)	51.8 (11.0)	31.3 (−0.4)	10.5 (−11.9)	2.4 (−16.4)	35.4 (1.9)
Daily mean °F (°C)	−9.3 (−22.9)	−1.2 (−18.4)	6.3 (−14.3)	27.4 (−2.6)	46.1 (7.8)	57.8 (14.3)	59.8 (15.4)	53.6 (12.0)	42.6 (5.9)	24.3 (−4.3)	3.3 (−15.9)	−5.2 (−20.7)	25.5 (−3.6)
Mean daily minimum °F (°C)	−17.4 (−27.4)	−10.6 (−23.7)	−6.3 (−21.3)	15.6 (−9.1)	33.4 (0.8)	45.4 (7.4)	48.8 (9.3)	43.2 (6.2)	33.5 (0.8)	17.4 (−8.1)	−4.0 (−20.0)	−12.9 (−24.9)	15.5 (−9.2)
Mean minimum °F (°C)	−49.6 (−45.3)	−38.8 (−39.3)	−32.1 (−35.6)	−10.3 (−23.5)	20.2 (−6.6)	34.8 (1.6)	38.4 (3.6)	30.8 (−0.7)	19.8 (−6.8)	−2.7 (−19.3)	−27.6 (−33.1)	−40.6 (−40.3)	−51.5 (−46.4)
Record low °F (°C)	−76 (−60)	−68 (−56)	−57 (−49)	−40 (−40)	−14 (−26)	23 (−5)	29 (−2)	20 (−7)	4 (−16)	−27 (−33)	−53 (−47)	−64 (−53)	−76 (−60)
Average precipitation inches (mm)	0.38 (9.7)	0.44 (11)	0.24 (6.1)	0.30 (7.6)	0.64 (16)	1.48 (38)	1.95 (50)	2.68 (68)	1.68 (43)	0.71 (18)	0.56 (14)	0.41 (10)	11.47 (291)
Average snowfall inches (cm)	7.7 (20)	8.0 (20)	5.4 (14)	2.5 (6.4)	0.3 (0.76)	0.0 (0.0)	0.0 (0.0)	0.0 (0.0)	0.8 (2.0)	5.0 (13)	10.0 (25)	10.3 (26)	50.0 (127)
Average extreme snow depth inches (cm)	20.3 (52)	22.2 (56)	24.0 (61)	18.6 (47)	1.8 (4.6)	0.0 (0.0)	0.0 (0.0)	0.0 (0.0)	0.3 (0.76)	4.3 (11)	10.5 (27)	15.6 (40)	26.4 (67)
Average precipitation days (≥ 0.01 in)	5.4	5.5	4.3	3.5	6.9	10.8	12.2	14.5	12.0	8.4	6.8	7.3	97.6
Average snowy days (≥ 0.1 in)	7.5	7.7	5.9	3.3	0.4	0.0	0.0	0.0	0.6	6.8	10.4	10.8	53.4
Source: NOAA

== Demographics ==
Historical population
Census	Pop.	Note	%±
1880	27		—
1890	120		344.4%
1900	186		55.0%
1910	398		114.0%
1920	213		−46.5%
1930	185		−13.1%
1940	170		−8.1%
1950	228		34.1%
1960	349		53.1%
1970	406		16.3%
1980	388		−4.4%
1990	345		−11.1%
2000	308		−10.7%
2010	246		−20.1%
2020	246		0.0%
U.S. Decennial Census

Tanana first appeared on the 1880 U.S. Census as the unincorporated Tinneh village and trading post of "Nuklukaiet." It reported 29 residents, of which 27 were Tinneh and 2 were White. In 1890, it returned as "Nuklukayet." It had 120 residents with 110 Natives, 7 Whites and 3 Creoles (Mixed Russian and Native). The census of 1890 also reported "Upper Tanana River Settlements", which featured 203 residents (all native). However, this likely referred to those living along the southwesternmost part of the Tanana River in present-day Southeast Fairbanks Census Area, nowhere near Tanana itself. In 1900, the community first reported as Tanana. It would formally incorporate in 1961.

Adjacent to Tanana on the west side was the military installation of Fort Gibbon, which reported 181 residents in 1920. It would be deactivated in 1923 and later annexed into Tanana. To the east side of Tanana was the Saint James Mission in 1900, later called Mission of Our Savior in 1910 (also known as the Tanana Native Village). It reported separately from Tanana on the 1900-1940 censuses (1900: 161 residents; 1910: 114; 1920: 99; 1930: 96; 1940: 75). It also was later annexed into Tanana.

=== 2020 census ===
As of the 2020 census, Tanana had a population of 246. The median age was 45.3 years. 19.9% of residents were under the age of 18 and 19.9% of residents were 65 years of age or older. For every 100 females there were 108.5 males, and for every 100 females age 18 and over there were 114.1 males age 18 and over.

0.0% of residents lived in urban areas, while 100.0% lived in rural areas.

There were 115 households in Tanana, of which 17.4% had children under the age of 18 living in them. Of all households, 24.3% were married-couple households, 32.2% were households with a male householder and no spouse or partner present, and 34.8% were households with a female householder and no spouse or partner present. About 51.3% of all households were made up of individuals and 14.8% had someone living alone who was 65 years of age or older.

There were 157 housing units, of which 26.8% were vacant. The homeowner vacancy rate was 0.0% and the rental vacancy rate was 2.0%.

Racial composition as of the 2020 census
Race	Number	Percentage
White	41	16.7%
Black or African American	0	0.0%
American Indian and Alaska Native	194	78.9%
Asian	1	0.4%
Native Hawaiian and Other Pacific Islander	0	0.0%
Some other race	2	0.8%
Two or more races	8	3.3%
Hispanic or Latino (of any race)	4	1.6%

=== 2000 census ===
As of the census of 2000, there were 308 people, 121 households, and 68 families residing in the city. The population density was 26.6 inhabitants per square mile (10.3/km^{2}). There were 166 housing units at an average density of 14.4 per square mile (5.6/km^{2}). The racial makeup of the city was 79.87% Native American, 17.86% White, and 2.27% from two or more races. 0.65% of the population were Hispanic or Latino of any race.

There were 121 households, out of which 41.3% had children under the age of 18 living with them, 26.4% were married couples living together, 20.7% had a female householder with no husband present, and 43.0% were non-families. 37.2% of all households were made up of individuals, and 10.7% had someone living alone who was 65 years of age or older. The average household size was 2.55 and the average family size was 3.43.

Most of the population is under the age of 65 with 34.7% under the age of 18, 6.5% from 18 to 24, 28.2% from 25 to 44, and 22.1% from 45 to 64; 8.4% were 65 years of age or older. The median age was 34 years. For every 100 females, there were 131.6 males. For every 100 females age 18 and over, there were 128.4 males.

The median income for a household in the city was $29,750, and the median income for a family was $34,028. Males had a median income of $30,781 versus $23,500 for females. The per capita income for the city was $12,077. About 16.4% of families and 23.0% of the population were below the poverty line, including 15.0% of those under the age of 18 and none of those 65 or over.

== Education ==
The Tanana City School District serves area residents.

== Transportation ==
Tanana is served by the Ralph M. Calhoun Memorial Airport located at the western edge of the city, 1 mile (1.6 km) from the city center. The only airline that regularly flies to Tanana is Wright Air Service based in Fairbanks. Boat transport on the river is possible in summer. Tanana is served by a one-lane dirt road, which connects Tanana to the Elliott Highway in Manley Hot Springs. The road ends about 6 miles (9.7 km) upstream from the town, but an ice road is constructed when the river freezes. The road opened in August 2016. The last 12 miles (19 km) of road is private property owned by the village corporation Tozitna Limited. The parking lot at the river is reserved for residents, shareholders, and tribal members. Since 2020, a shareholder has been hired to monitor the parking lot.

== Notable people ==
- Morris Thompson (1939–2000), politician, was born and raised in Tanana. After he died in the crash of Alaska Airlines Flight 261, his body was returned to the city for burial.
- Jules Louis Prevost (1863–1937), an early missionary and linguist in the area; he was the first postmaster.
- Walter Harper (1893–1918), (Koyukuk) the first man to reach the summit of Denali (Mount McKinley) in the successful 1913 expedition led by Hudson Stuck and Harry Karstens

== See also ==
- 2014 Alaska state trooper killings
