= Huslia, Alaska =

Huslia Ts’aateyhdenaadekk’onh Denh
- City
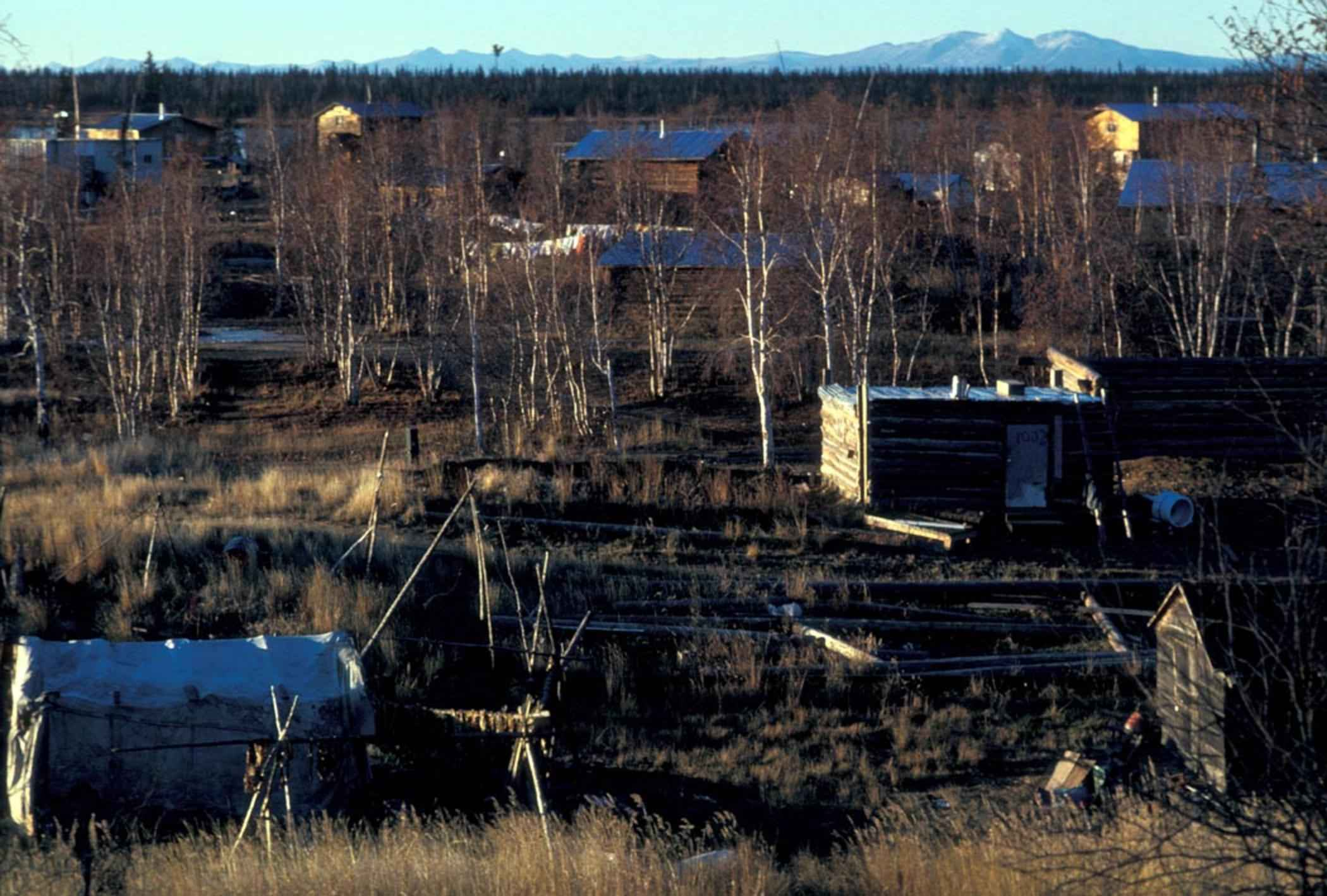
- Houses in Huslia

- Location in Alaska
- Coordinates: 65°42′07″N 156°23′14″W
- Country: United States
- State: Alaska
- Census Area: Yukon-Koyukuk
- Incorporated: June 9, 1969

Government
  - Mayor: S. Joyce Sam
  - State senator: Click Bishop (R)
  - State rep.: Mike Cronk (R)

Area
  - Total: 16.34 sq mi (42.33 km^{2})
  - Land: 15.78 sq mi (40.88 km^{2})
  - Water: 0.56 sq mi (1.45 km^{2})
- Elevation: 157 ft (48 m)

Population (2020)
  - Total: 304
  - Density: 19.3/sq mi (7.44/km^{2})
- Time zone: UTC-9 (Alaska (AKST))
  - Summer (DST): UTC-8 (AKDT)
- ZIP code: 99746
- Area code: 907
- FIPS code: 02-34350
- GNIS feature ID: 1403644, 2419400

Huslia (/ˈhuːsliə/; Koyukon: Ts’aateyhdenaadekk’onh Denh [t͡sʼæːtʰəj̊tənætəqʼon̥ tən̥]) is a city in Yukon-Koyukuk Census Area, Alaska, United States. Rarely known as Hussliakatna, it is inhabited by Koyukuk-hotana Athabascans. As of the 2020 census, Huslia had a population of 304. In January 2025, Huslia became notable for being unusually warm at a time when much of the US was experiencing atypically cold weather due to a polar vortex. Huslia was 20 degrees Fahrenheit warmer in January 2025 than it typically is that month, which was the largest heat increase in the country.

== Geography ==
Huslia is located at 65°42′7″N 156°23′14″W (65.701858, -156.387134). It is in the interior of Alaska, on the Koyukuk River, near its confluence with the Huslia River. It does not have road or rail access, but is served by Huslia Airport.

According to the United States Census Bureau, the city has a total area of 17.2 square miles (45 km^{2}), of which, 16.4 square miles (42 km^{2}) is land and 0.7 square miles (1.8 km^{2}) (4.25%) is water.

== Demographics ==
Historical population
Census	Pop.	Note	%±
1950	65		—
1960	168		158.5%
1970	159		−5.4%
1980	188		18.2%
1990	207		10.1%
2000	293		41.5%
2010	275		−6.1%
2020	304		10.5%
U.S. Decennial Census

Huslia first appeared on the 1950 U.S. Census as the unincorporated village of "Cutoff." The name changed to Huslia beginning with the 1960 census and incorporated as such in 1969.

=== 2020 census ===
As of the 2020 census, Huslia had a population of 304. The median age was 28.3 years. 37.5% of residents were under the age of 18 and 7.9% of residents were 65 years of age or older. For every 100 females there were 112.6 males, and for every 100 females age 18 and over there were 95.9 males age 18 and over.

0.0% of residents lived in urban areas, while 100.0% lived in rural areas.

There were 104 households in Huslia, of which 45.2% had children under the age of 18 living in them. Of all households, 24.0% were married-couple households, 27.9% were households with a male householder and no spouse or partner present, and 36.5% were households with a female householder and no spouse or partner present. About 28.9% of all households were made up of individuals and 3.9% had someone living alone who was 65 years of age or older.

There were 127 housing units, of which 18.1% were vacant. The homeowner vacancy rate was 0.0% and the rental vacancy rate was 31.0%.

Racial composition as of the 2020 census
Race	Number	Percent
White	13	4.3%
Black or African American	0	0.0%
American Indian and Alaska Native	279	91.8%
Asian	0	0.0%
Native Hawaiian and Other Pacific Islander	0	0.0%
Some other race	0	0.0%
Two or more races	12	3.9%
Hispanic or Latino (of any race)	4	1.3%

=== 2000 census ===
As of the 2000 census, there were 293 people, 88 households, and 63 families residing in the city. The population density was 17.8 inhabitants per square mile (6.9/km^{2}). There were 111 housing units at an average density of 6.8 per square mile (2.6/km^{2}). The racial makeup of the city was 4.44% White, 93.52% Native American, 0.34% Pacific Islander, and 1.71% from two or more races. 1.37% of the population were Hispanic or Latino of any race.

There were 88 households, out of which 56.8% had children under the age of 18 living with them, 39.8% were married couples living together, 26.1% had a female householder with no husband present, and 27.3% were non-families. 22.7% of all households were made up of individuals, and 3.4% had someone living alone who was 65 years of age or older. The average household size was 3.33 and the average family size was 3.83.

In the city, the population was spread out, with 43.0% under the age of 18, 8.5% from 18 to 24, 25.9% from 25 to 44, 15.7% from 45 to 64, and 6.8% who were 65 years of age or older. The median age was 24 years. For every 100 females, there were 110.8 males. For every 100 females age 18 and over, there were 108.8 males.

The median income for a household in the city was $27,000, and the median income for a family was $31,000. Males had a median income of $52,500 versus $30,313 for females. The per capita income for the city was $10,983. About 22.9% of families and 28.1% of the population were below the poverty line, including 37.9% of those under the age of eighteen and none of those 65 or over.

== Education ==
The Yukon–Koyukuk School District operates the Jimmy Huntington School in Huslia.
