= Hughes, Alaska =

Hughes Hut’odlee Kkaakk’et
- City
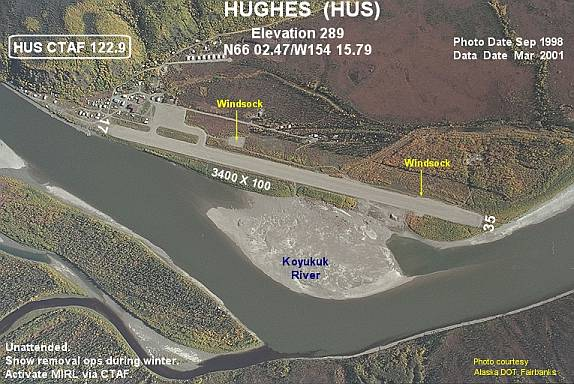
- Aerial view of the Hughes Airport in Hughes

- Location in Alaska
- Coordinates: 66°2′39″N 154°15′25″W
- Country: United States
- State: Alaska
- Census Area: Yukon-Koyukuk
- Incorporated: October 30, 1973

Government
  - Mayor: Wilmer Beetus
  - State senator: Click Bishop (R)
  - State rep.: Mike Cronk (R)

Area
  - Total: 3.04 sq mi (7.87 km^{2})
  - Land: 3.04 sq mi (7.87 km^{2})
  - Water: 0 sq mi (0.00 km^{2})
- Elevation: 377 ft (115 m)

Population (2020)
  - Total: 85
  - Density: 28/sq mi (10.8/km^{2})
- Time zone: UTC-9 (Alaska (AKST))
  - Summer (DST): UTC-8 (AKDT)
- ZIP code: 99745
- Area code: 907
- FIPS code: 02-33910
- GNIS feature ID: 1403596

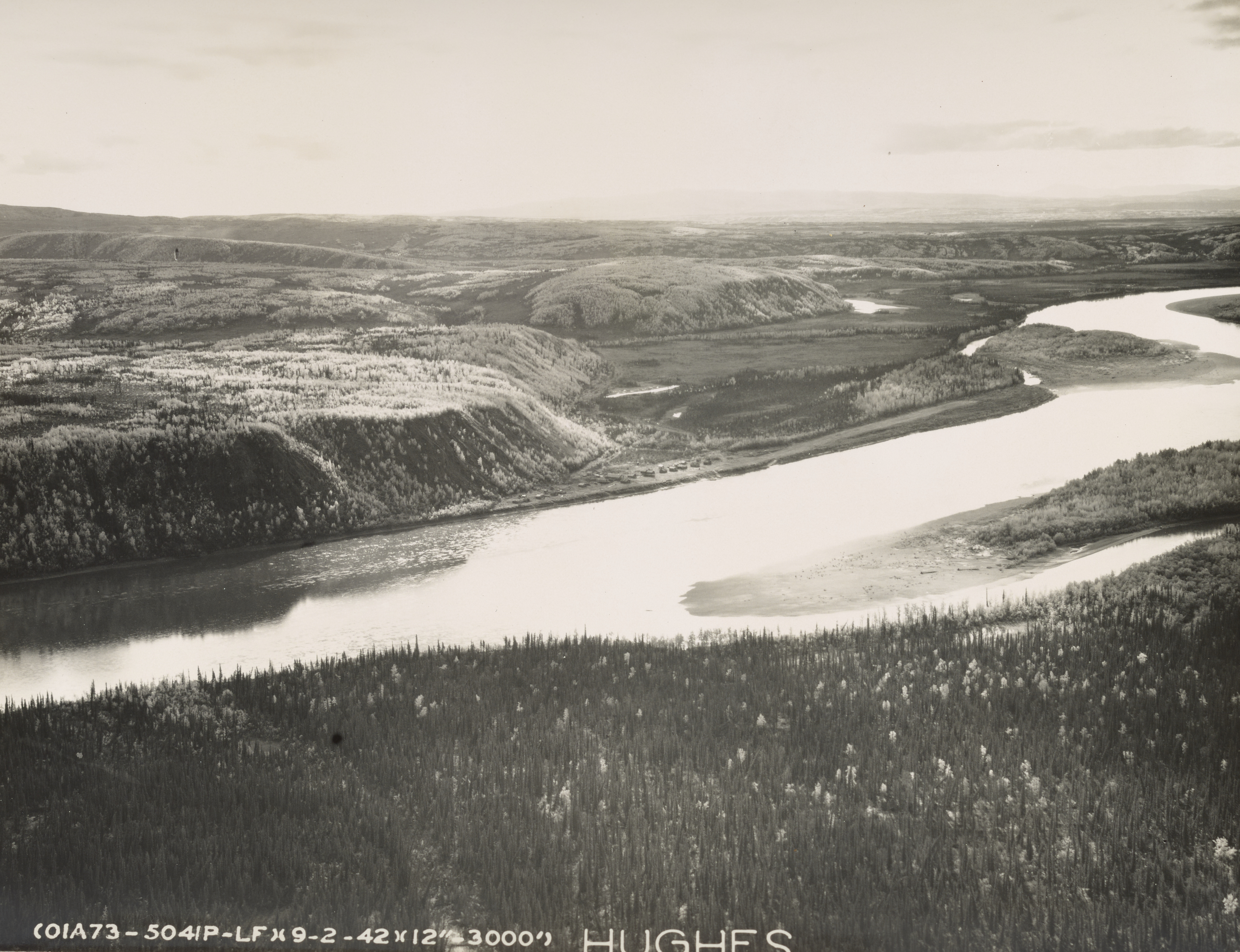
Hughes in 1942

Hughes (Koyukon: Hut’odlee Kkaakk’et) is a city in Yukon-Koyukuk Census Area, Alaska, United States. The population was 85 at the 2020 census, up from 77 in 2010.

== Geography ==
According to the United States Census Bureau, the city has a total area of 3.1 square miles (8.0 km^{2}), all of it land.

== Demographics ==
Historical population
Census	Pop.	Note	%±
1920	45		—
1940	32		—
1950	49		53.1%
1960	69		40.8%
1970	85		23.2%
1980	73		−14.1%
1990	54		−26.0%
2000	78		44.4%
2010	77		−1.3%
2020	85		10.4%
U.S. Decennial Census

Hughes first appeared on the 1920 U.S. Census as an unincorporated village. It did not appear on the 1930 census, but returned in 1940. It formally incorporated in 1973.

The majority of the town's population are ethnic Koyukon, Alaskan Athabaskans. Some of the town's population, as of the 1970s, spoke the Central Dialect of the Koyukon language.

=== 2020 census ===
As of the 2020 census, Hughes had a population of 85. The median age was 32.8 years. 29.4% of residents were under the age of 18 and 12.9% were 65 years of age or older. For every 100 females there were 107.3 males, and for every 100 females age 18 and over there were 100.0 males age 18 and over.

0.0% of residents lived in urban areas, while 100.0% lived in rural areas.

There were 32 households in Hughes, of which 46.9% had children under the age of 18 living in them. Of all households, 9.4% were married-couple households, 28.1% were households with a male householder and no spouse or partner present, and 34.4% were households with a female householder and no spouse or partner present. About 43.8% of all households were made up of individuals and 34.4% had someone living alone who was 65 years of age or older.

There were 47 housing units, of which 31.9% were vacant. The homeowner vacancy rate was 10.5% and the rental vacancy rate was 0.0%.

Racial composition as of the 2020 census
Race	Number	Percent
White	5	5.9%
Black or African American	0	0.0%
American Indian and Alaska Native	76	89.4%
Asian	0	0.0%
Native Hawaiian and Other Pacific Islander	0	0.0%
Some other race	0	0.0%
Two or more races	4	4.7%
Hispanic or Latino (of any race)	1	1.2%

=== Income ===
The median income for a household in the city was $28,750, and the median income for a family was $37,917. The per capita income for the city was $12,126. There was 30.6% of the population living below the poverty line, including 22.2% of under eighteens and 41.7% of those over 64.

== Education ==
The Yukon–Koyukuk School District operates the Johnny Oldman School in Hughes.
