= Fort Yukon Air Service =

Airline of the United States (1951–1984)

Air North
- Founded: 1951
- Ceased operations: 1984
- Hubs: Fairbanks; Fort Yukon
- Headquarters: Fairbanks, Alaska
- Key people: Tommy Olson (President); Ron Klemm (Vice President)
- Founder: Clifton L. Fairchild

Fort Yukon Air Service, later known as Air North, was an Alaskan regional airline from 1951 to 1984.

== History ==
Fort Yukon Air Service was founded in 1951. By 1955, it was based at Phillips Field in Fairbanks. In March 1969, the company, now co-owned by Tom Olson, began scheduled flights to Fort Yukon. The airline picked up a number of mail contracts in 1969.

In December 1973, the company changed its name to Air North. Air North acquired an Aero Commander in February 1974. By the following month, the company was managing Metro Field. The next month it broke ground on a new terminal at the airport.

Alyeska Air Service, a subsidiary of Air North, was sued by Tyonek, Alaska in April 1977 for allegedly violating its airspace. Air North responded that if the claim was enforced across all Alaskan airports air travel in the state would be unsustainable. Six months later the native corporation moved to dismiss the case. In 1978 it acquired a Trislander. Later that year Wien Airlines, who Air North was subcontracted with, argued that it had overcharged passengers. Air North rebutted that it was passing along a tariff that had been imposed upon it by the Alaska Transportation Commission. In December, it supported an effort by the North Pole radio station KJNP to fly Christmas presents to rural towns.

On 21 January 1981, Air North was the first airline in Alaska to receive a commuter airline certificate following deregulation. The next September, Air North planned to take over 29 routes to remote villages as an essential air service after the CAB ruled that Wien Airlines could stop servicing them. This represented a change as the latter was subsidized by the federal government, while the former was not.

An investigation in 1983 by the Fairbanks Daily News-Miner found that the company had been penalized by the FAA seven times for safety violations. Air North countered that it had been targeted by the FAA and other local operators and that attempting to fight the allegations would be disproportionately expensive. Following the story, a number of passengers submitted editorials chastising the paper claiming it misrepresenting the situation and supporting Air North. A subsequent two part column covered the investigation of and then dropping of charges against an Air North pilot by the FAA.

The company, along with Valdez Airlines, was bought by Liberty Air in August 1984. The following month, after the latter declared bankruptcy, former employees considered forming their own airline.

== Destinations ==
| Country | State / province | City | Airport | Notes | Refs |
|---|---|---|---|---|---|
| United States | Alaska | Allakaket | Allakaket Airport | | |
| United States | Alaska | Anaktuvuk Pass | Anaktuvuk Pass Airport | | |
| United States | Alaska | Arctic Village | Arctic Village Airport | | |
| United States | Alaska | Barrow | Wiley Post–Will Rogers Memorial Airport | | |
| United States | Alaska | Barter Island | Barter Island LRRS Airport | | |
| United States | Alaska | Beaver | Beaver Airport | | |
| United States | Alaska | Bettles | Bettles Airport | | |
| United States | Alaska | Birch Creek | Birch Creek Airport | | |
| United States | Alaska | Central | Central Airport | | |
| United States | Alaska | Chalkyitsik | Chalkyitsik Airport | | |
| United States | Alaska | Chandalar | Chandalar Lake Airport | | |
| United States | Alaska | Circle City | Circle City Airport | | |
| United States | Alaska | Circle Hot Springs | Circle Hot Springs Airport | | |
| United States | Alaska | Eagle | Eagle Airport | | |
| United States | Alaska | Fairbanks | Metro Field | Hub | |
| United States | Alaska | Fort Yukon | Fort Yukon Airport | Hub | |
| United States | Alaska | Galena | Galena Airport | | |
| United States | Alaska | Hughes | Hughes Airport | | |
| United States | Alaska | Huslia | Huslia Airport | | |
| United States | Alaska | Kaltag | Kaltag Airport | | |
| United States | Alaska | Koyukuk | Koyukuk Airport | | |
| United States | Alaska | Lake Minchumina | | | |
| United States | Alaska | Manley Hot Springs | Manley Hot Springs Airport | | |
| United States | Alaska | Minto | Minto Airport | | |
| United States | Alaska | Nulato | Nulato Airport | | |
| United States | Alaska | Rampart | Rampart Airport | | |
| United States | Alaska | Ruby | Ruby Airport | | |
| United States | Alaska | Stevens Village | Stevens Village Airport | | |
| United States | Alaska | Tanana | Tanana Airport | | |
| United States | Alaska | Venetie | Venetie Airport | | |
| United States | Alaska | Utopia | | | |
| United States | Alaska | Wiseman | Wiseman Airport | | |

== Fleet ==
=== Historical fleet ===
Air North historical fleet
| Aircraft | Total | Introduced | Retired | Notes |
|---|---|---|---|---|
| Aero Commander 680 | 4 | Unknown | Unknown | |
| Beechcraft C-45 Expeditor | 3 | Unknown | Unknown | |
| Britten-Norman Trislander | | Unknown | Unknown | |
| Cessna 207 | | Unknown | Unknown | |
| Curtiss C-46 Commando | | Unknown | Unknown | |
| Douglas DC-3 | 4 | Unknown | Unknown | |
| Fairchild F-27 | 1 | Unknown | Unknown | Under lease |
| Fairchild FH-227 | 1 | Unknown | Unknown | Under lease |
| Piper PA-31 Navajo | | Unknown | Unknown | |

== Accidents and incidents ==
- On 31 January 1975, an Air North Aero Commander made a belly landing at Eielson Air Force Base after the landing gear failed to extend. An effort by a pilot in a second airplane to force it down and locked it was unsuccessful.
- On 25 October 1979, an Air North Cessna 207 crashed near Venetie, Alaska due to an engine failure, killing a passenger and injuring the two pilots and another passenger.
- On 18 June 1980, an Air North Cessna 207 crashed on takeoff at Alder Creek, Alaska due to poor runway conditions.
- On 24 June 1983, an Air North DC-3 made an emergency landing at Metro Field after the left engine caught fire. The fire was eventually determined to have been caused by loose fuel line fittings.

== See also ==
- Air North
- Everts Air
