= Birch Creek Airport =

- IATA: KBC; ICAO: PAAR; FAA LID: Z91

Summary
- Airport type: Public
- Owner: State of Alaska DOT&PF - Northern Region
- Serves: Birch Creek, Alaska
- Elevation AMSL: 450 ft (140 m)
- Coordinates: 66°16′26″N 145°49′27″W

Map
- Location of airport in Alaska

Runways
Direction	Length		Surface
Direction	ft	m	Surface
16/34	4,000	1,219	Gravel

Statistics (2015)
- Aircraft operations: 850
- Based aircraft: 0
- Passengers: 515
- Freight: 31,000 lbs
- Source: Federal Aviation Administration

Birch Creek Airport (IATA: KBC, ICAO: PAAR, FAA LID: Z91) is a state-owned, public-use airport located one nautical mile (1.85 km) north-northwest of the central business district of Birch Creek, in the Yukon-Koyukuk Census Area in the U.S. state of Alaska.

== Facilities and aircraft ==
Birch Creek Airport covers an area of 155 acres (63 ha) at an elevation of 450 feet (137 m) above mean sea level. It has one runway designated 16/34 with a gravel surface measuring 4,000 by 75 feet (1,219 x 23 m). For the 12-month period ending December 31, 2005, the airport had 850 aircraft operations, an average of 70 per month: 59% air taxi and 41% general aviation.

== Airlines and destinations ==
The following airlines offer scheduled passenger service at this airport:

Airlines	Destinations
Wright Air Service	Fairbanks, Venetie

=== Statistics ===
Carrier shares: January – December 2015
Carrier	Passengers (arriving and departing)
Wright Air	515(100.00%)

Top domestic destinations: January – December 2015
Rank	City	Airport	Passengers
1	(Alaska) Fairbanks, AK	Fairbanks International Airport	200
2	(Alaska) Fort Yukon, AK	Fort Yukon Airport	50
3	(Alaska) Venetie, AK	Venetie Airport	10

== See also ==
- List of airports in Alaska
