= Fort Yukon Airport =

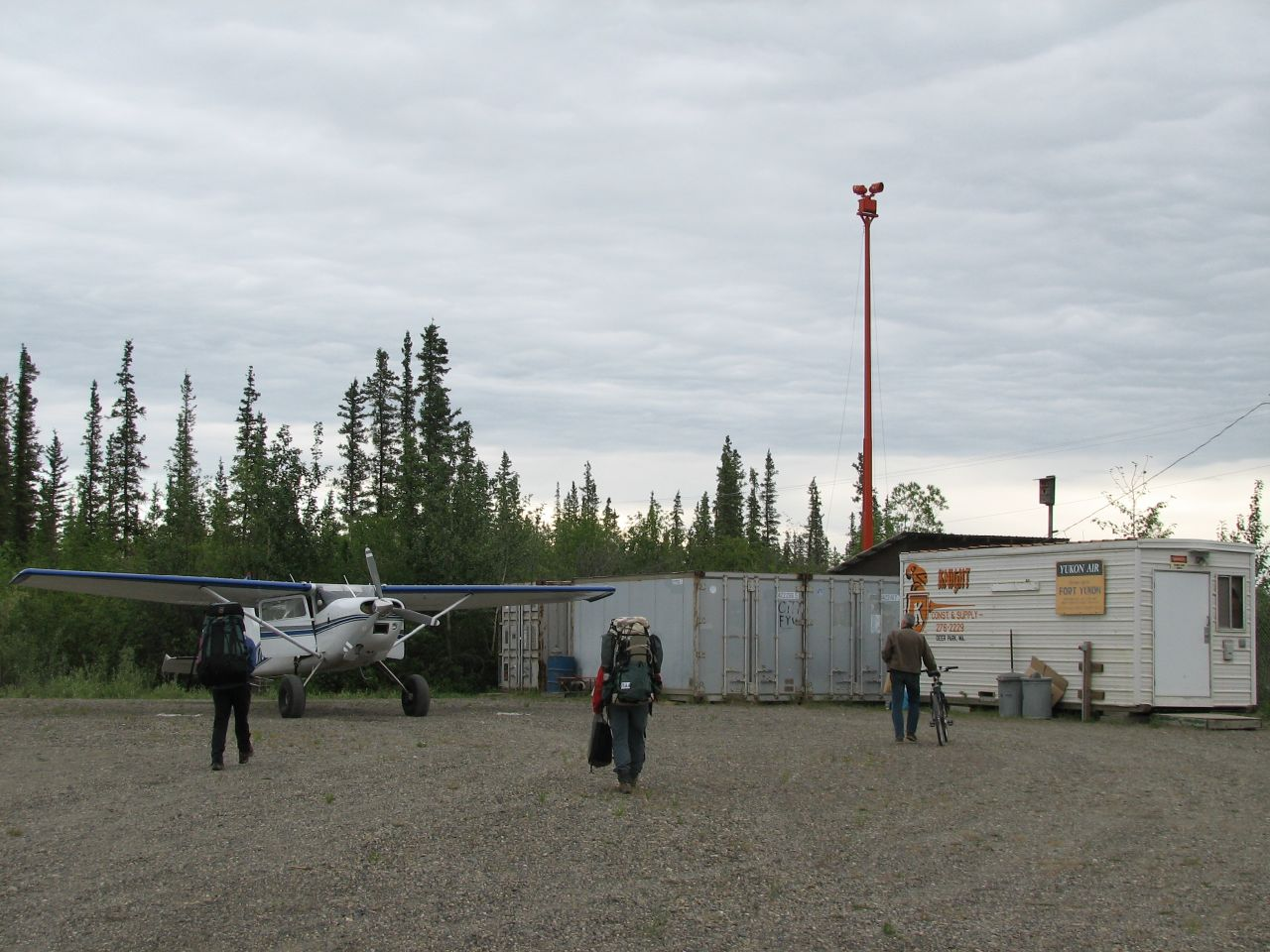
- IATA: FYU; ICAO: PFYU; FAA LID: FYU

Summary
- Airport type: Public
- Owner: State of Alaska DOT&PF - Northern Region
- Serves: Fort Yukon, Alaska
- Elevation AMSL: 438 ft (134 m)
- Coordinates: 66°34′21″N 145°14′47″W

Map
- Location of airport in Alaska

Runways
Direction	Length		Surface
Direction	ft	m	Surface
4/22	5,000	1,524	Gravel

Statistics (2016)
- Aircraft operations (2015): 8,350
- Based aircraft (2017): 0
- Passengers: 12,479
- Freight: 1,586,000 lbs
- Source: Federal Aviation Administration; Source: Bureau of Transportation

Fort Yukon Airport (IATA: FYU, ICAO: PFYU, FAA LID: FYU) is a state-owned public-use airport located in the city of Fort Yukon, in the Yukon–Koyukuk Census Area of the U.S. state of Alaska.

== Facilities and aircraft ==
Fort Yukon Airport covers an area of 261 acres (106 ha) and has one gravel runway (3/21) measuring 5,810 x 150 ft (1,771 x 46 m).

For 12-month period ending December 31, 2005, the airport had 8,350 aircraft operations, an average of 22 per day: 60% air taxi, 37% general aviation and 3% military. There are 13 aircraft based at this airport: 85% single engine and 15% Ryan.

== Airlines and destinations ==
The following airlines offer scheduled passenger service at this airport:

Airlines	Destinations
Everts Air	Fairbanks
Wright Air Service	Arctic Village, Birch Creek, Chalkyitsik, Fairbanks, Venetie

=== Statistics ===
Carrier shares: May 2019 – April 2020
Carrier	Passengers (arriving and departing)
Warbelows	670(5.33%)
Wright	11,430(91.19%)
Hageland	290(2.32%)
Tatonduk	15(1.16%)

Top domestic destinations: May 2019 - April 2020
Rank	City	Airport	Passengers
1	(Alaska) Fairbanks, AK	Fairbanks International Airport	5,450
3	(Alaska) Venetie, AK	Venetie Airport	230
2	(Alaska) Chalkyitsik, AK	Chalkyitsik Airport	300
4	(Alaska) Arctic Village, AK	Arctic Village Airport	110
5	(Alaska) Birch Creek, AK	Birch Creek Airport	110

== See also ==
- List of airports in Alaska
- Fort Yukon Air Service
