= Anaktuvuk Pass Airport =

Airport in Alaska, United States

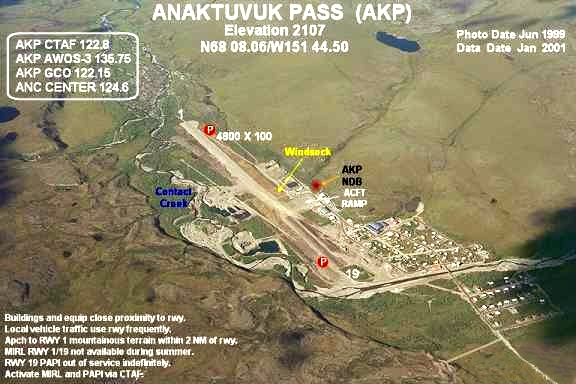
- IATA: AKP; ICAO: PAKP; FAA LID: AKP

Summary
- Airport type: Public
- Owner: North Slope Borough
- Serves: Anaktuvuk Pass, Alaska
- Elevation AMSL: 2,102 ft (641 m)
- Coordinates: 68°08′01″N 151°44′36″W

Map
- Location of airport in Alaska

Runways
Direction	Length		Surface
Direction	ft	m	Surface
2/20	4,800	1,463	Gravel

Statistics (2024)
- Aircraft operations: 1014 (2024)
- Based aircraft: 0
- Passengers: 6,171
- Freight: 2,596,000 lbs
- Source: Federal Aviation Administration

Anaktuvuk Pass Airport (IATA: AKP, ICAO: PAKP, FAA LID: AKP) is a public use airport located in Anaktuvuk Pass, a city in the North Slope Borough of the U.S. state of Alaska. The airport is owned by North Slope Borough.

As per Federal Aviation Administration records, the airport had 3,000 passenger boardings (enplanements) in calendar year 2023, 1,833 enplanements in 2020, and 3,402 in 2015. It is included in the National Plan of Integrated Airport Systems for 2025–2029, which categorized it as a non-primary commercial service airport (between 2,500 and 10,000 enplanements per year).

== Facilities and aircraft ==
Anaktuvuk Pass Airport resides at elevation of 2,102 feet (641 m) above mean sea level. It has one runway designated 2/20 with a gravel surface measuring 4,800 by 100 feet (1,463 x 30 m).

== Airlines and destinations ==
The following airlines offer scheduled passenger service at this airport:

Airlines	Destinations
Everts Air	Fairbanks
Wright Air Service	Fairbanks
Warbelow's Air Ventures	Fairbanks

=== Statistics ===
Carrier shares: January – December 2024
Carrier	Passengers (arriving and departing)
Wright	4,670(75.74%)
Tatonduk	1,500(24.26)

Top domestic destinations: January – December 2024
Rank	City	Airport	Passengers
1	Fairbanks, Alaska	Fairbanks International Airport (FAI)	3,010
2	Kaktovik, AK	Barter Island LRRS Airport (BTI)	10
3	Bettles, AK	Bettles Airport (BTT)	10

== See also ==
- List of airports in Alaska
