= Barter Island LRRS Airport =

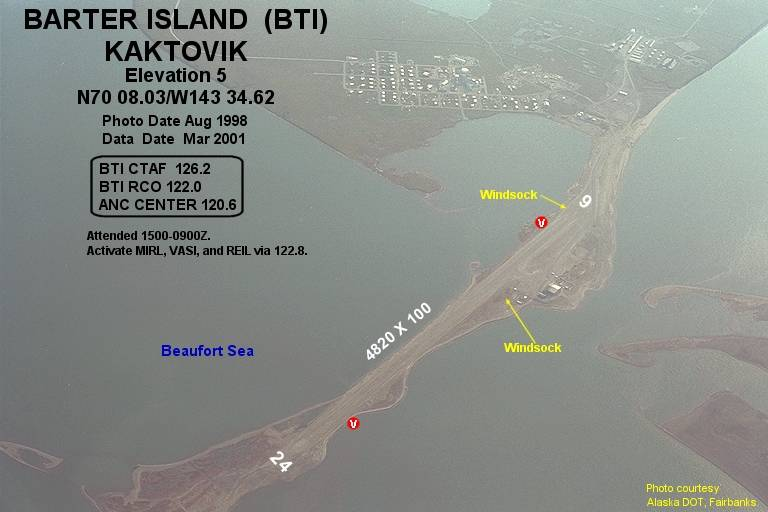
- IATA: BTI; ICAO: PABA; FAA LID: BTI

Summary
- Airport type: Public / military
- Owner: North Slope Borough
- Location: Barter Island, Alaska
- Elevation AMSL: 2 ft (0.61 m)
- Coordinates: 70°08′02″N 143°34′55″W

Map
- Location of Barter Island LRRS Airport

Runways
Direction	Length		Surface
Direction	ft	m	Surface
7/25	4,500	1,372	Gravel

Statistics (2015)
- Aircraft operations: 3,350
- Based aircraft: 0
- Passengers: 5,077
- Freight: 1,358,000 lbs
- Source: Federal Aviation Administration

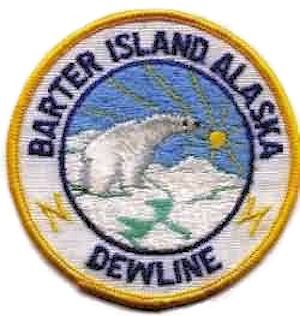
Barter Island DEW Line patch

Barter Island LRRS Airport (IATA: BTI, ICAO: PABA, FAA LID: BTI) is a public/military airport located near the city of Kaktovik on Barter Island, in the North Slope Borough, located 312 miles (502 km) east of Point Barrow, Alaska. The airport is owned by the North Slope Borough. It is also known as Barter Island Airport or Kaktovik Airport. The acronym LRRS stands for Long Range Radar Site or Long Range Radar Station.

== Facilities and aircraft ==
Barter Island LRRS Airport has one runway designed 7/25 with a gravel surface measuring 4,820 by 100 feet (1,469 x 30 m). For the 12-month period ending December 31, 2005, the airport had 3,350 aircraft operations, an average of 9 per day: 75% air taxi, 24% general aviation and 1% military.

== Airlines and destinations ==
Airlines	Destinations
Everts Air	Fairbanks
Wright Air Service	Deadhorse/Prudhoe Bay, Fairbanks

=== Statistics ===
Carrier shares: January – December 2015
Carrier	Passengers (arriving and departing)
Hageland	5,080(99.98%)

Top domestic destinations: January – December 2015
Rank	City	Airport	Passengers
1	(Alaska) Deadhorse, AK	Deadhorse Airport (SCC)	1,270
2	(Alaska) Fairbanks, AK	Fairbanks International Airport (FAI)	1,210
3	(Alaska) Barrow, AK	Wiley Post-Will Rogers Memorial Airport (BRW)	20
4	(Alaska) Fort Yukon, AK	Fort Yukon Airport (FYU)	10

== History ==
The original runway was built by the United States military in 1947. The U.S. Air Force assumed control of Barter Island in 1951 and extended the runway in 1953 to support the Distant Early Warning Line Radar station at Barter Island (BAR-MAIN). The Barter Island DEW Line station was operated by civilian contract workers. The DEW Line station was inactivated in 1990 and the station personnel were relieved of duty.

The radar station was upgraded with an AN/FPS-117 minimally attended Long Range surveillance radar in the winter of 1990. A prototype AN/FPS-124 short-range radar was also installed. The station was re-designated part of the North Warning System (NWS) as a Long Range Radar Site, A-21, being controlled by the Pacific Air Forces 611th Air Support Group, based at Elmendorf AFB.

In 1998 Pacific Air Forces initiated "Operation Clean Sweep", in which abandoned Cold War stations in Alaska were remediated and the land restored to its previous state. The site remediation of the radar and support station was carried out by the 611th Civil Engineering Squadron at Elmendorf, and remediation work was completed by 2005.

The airport remains open to support the small settlement at Kaktovik and to provide contractor support access to the military radar site.

== Distant Early Warning Line support ==
The Barter Island station controlled a sector of the Distant Early Warning Line. The BAR sector was composed of a series of surveillance radar stations along the North Slope of the Alaska Coast as well as stations in the Canadian Yukon and Northwest Territories.

Barter Island controlled nine staffed stations, four of them being classified as "auxiliary" sites and five "intermediate" stations. The auxiliary stations were similar to the main site at Barter Island; the intermediate sites had less personnel at them. The stations were made up of an AN/FPS-19 search radar, a high power L-Band radar consisting of two identical radar sets feeding a dual (back to back) antenna with a range of about 160 nautical miles. The sites had one 25-man module building for personnel who supported the radar, and an airstrip, although the length and capacity varied greatly, making frequent risky landings necessary at some sites.

Each of the sites was staffed by civilian contract workers who had signed 18-month contracts, although they were visited by Air Force military personnel frequently.

DEW ID	Site name	Location	Activated	Inactivated	Notes
BAR-1	Komakuk Beach, Yukon	69°35′41″N 140°10′44″W	1957	1993	DEW Axillary site, operations ended 1993; Became part of the North Warning System (NWS) with AN/FPS-124 SRR
BAR-2	Shingle Point, Yukon	68°55′48″N 137°14′17″W	1957	1989	DEW Axillary site, operations ended 1989; Became part of the North Warning System (NWS) with AN/FPS-117 LRR
BAR-3	Tuktoyaktuk, Northwest Territories	69°26′35″N 132°59′55″W	1957	1993	DEW Axillary site, operations ended 1993; Became part of the North Warning System (NWS) with AN/FPS-124 SRR
BAR-4	Nicholson Peninsula, Northwest Territories	69°55′28″N 128°58′23″W	1957	1993	DEW Axillary site, operations ended 1993; became part of the North Warning System (NWS) with AN/FPS-124 SRR
BAR-A	Demarcation Bay, Alaska	69°53′09″N 142°18′28″W	1957	1963	DEW Intermediate site, closed 1963; remediated about 2000 by USAF, gravel runway and graded site remains.
BAR-B	Stokes Point, Yukon	69°19′49″N 138°44′13″W	1957	1963	DEW Intermediate site, closed 1963, current status undetermined; BAR-BA3 (new site) became part of the North Warning System (NWS) in 1990 with AN/FPS-124 SRR
BAR-C	Tununuk Camp, Northwest Territories	69°00′10″N 134°40′00″W	1957	1963	DEW Intermediate site, closed 1963; current status undetermined.
BAR-D	Atkinson Point, Northwest Territories	69°56′00″N 131°25′50″W	1957	1963	DEW Intermediate site, closed 1963; current status undetermined; BAR-DA1 (new site) became part of the North Warning System (NWS) in 1990 with AN/FPS-124 SRR
BAR-E	Horton River, Northwest Territories	70°00′59″N 126°56′35″W	1957	1963	DEW Intermediate site, closed 1963; became part of the North Warning System (NWS), June 1991 with AN/FPS-124 SRR

With the signing of the North American Air Defence Modernization agreement at the "Shamrock Summit" between Prime Minister Mulroney and President Reagan in Quebec City on 18 March 1985, the DEW Line began its eventual upgrading and transition becoming the North Warning System (NWS) of today. The intermediate sites were closed in 1963 due to the advancements in radar technology. Operational NWS sites have retained their former DEW Line designations. The Canadian NWS sites are under the jurisdiction of the NORAD Canada West ROCC at CFB North Bay Ontario; Barter Island is under the jurisdiction of the Alaska NORAD Region ROCC at Elmendorf AFB.

== See also ==
- Alaskan Air Command
- Distant Early Warning Line
- Eleventh Air Force
- List of airports in Alaska
- North Warning System
