= Chalkyitsik Airport =

Airport in Alaska, United States

- IATA: CIK; ICAO: PACI; FAA LID: CIK

Summary
- Airport type: Public
- Owner: State of Alaska DOT&PF
- Serves: Chalkyitsik, Alaska
- Elevation AMSL: 544 ft (166 m)
- Coordinates: 66°38′42″N 143°44′24″W

Map
- Location of airport in Alaska

Runways
Direction	Length		Surface
Direction	ft	m	Surface
3/21	4,000	1,219	Gravel/dirt

Statistics (2015)
- Aircraft operations: 650
- Based aircraft: 0
- Passengers: 1,341
- Freight: 206,000 lbs
- Source: Federal Aviation Administration

Chalkyitsik Airport (IATA: CIK, ICAO: PACI, FAA LID: CIK) is a state-owned public-use airport serving Chalkyitsik, in the Yukon-Koyukuk Census Area of the U.S. state of Alaska.

== Facilities and aircraft ==
Chalkyitsik Airport has one runway designated 3/21 with a gravel surface measuring is 4,000 by 90 feet (1,219 x 27 m). For the 12-month period ending December 31, 2005, the airport had 650 aircraft operations, an average of 54 per month: 77% air taxi and 23% general aviation.

== Airlines and destinations ==
Airlines	Destinations
Wright Air Service	Birch Creek, Fairbanks, Fort Yukon

=== Statistics ===
Carrier shares: January – December 2015
Carrier	Passengers (arriving and departing)
Warbelow's	1,341(100.00%)

Top domestic destinations: January – December 2015
Rank	City	Airport	Passengers
1	(Alaska) Fairbanks, AK	Fairbanks International Airport	440
2	(Alaska) Fort Yukon, AK	Fort Yukon Airport	230

== See also ==
- List of airports in Alaska
