= Demarcation Bay DEW Line Station =

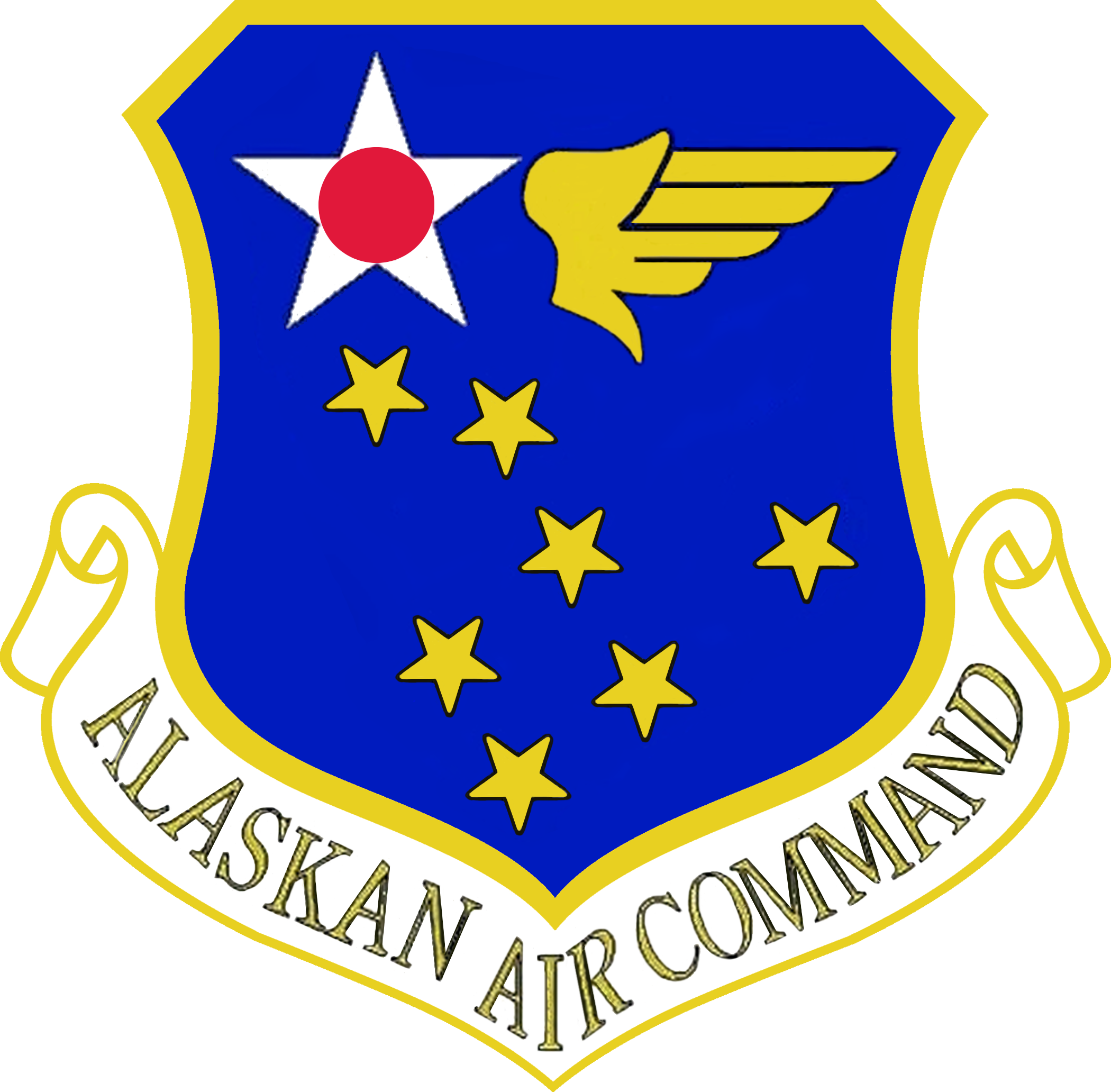
Demarcation Bay DEW Line Station
- Part of Alaskan Air Command (AAC)

Site information
- Type: Air Force Station
- Controlled by: United States Air Force

Location
- Location of Demarcation Bay DEW Line Station, Alaska
- Coordinates: 69°53′09″N 142°18′28″W

Site history
- Built: 1957
- In use: 1957-1963

Demarcation Bay DEW Line Station is an abandoned United States Air Force Distant Early Warning Line Radar station located on the north coast of Alaska, United States. The site is situated on Nuvagapak Point, about 25 miles (40 km) northwest of the topographical Demarcation Bay and 35 miles (56 km) from the border with Canada. Situated 349 miles (562 km) east of Point Barrow, it was the most remote DEW site in Alaska. Demarcation Bay DEW Line Station was closed in 1964, and is not open for public use.

== History ==
The station was built in 1957 to support the Distant Early Warning Line. Designated BAR-A, it was classified as an "Intermediate Site". Intermediate sites were small, consisting of usually one or two buildings, and AN/FPS-23 Doppler radar systems, which transmitted CW signals to the adjacent Main or Auxiliary stations. Low flying aircraft trying to penetrate the DEWLine would be detected by a Doppler shift at the adjacent receiving station and thus signal an alarm which indicated an intrusion was in progress.

The system was so sensitive that often flocks of birds would trigger false alarms. BAR-A had a permanent 1500’ gravel airstrip for support. In the winter, a 5000’ ice runway was laid out across the bay when the sea ice exceeded 6’ in thickness. The ice runway could accommodate larger aircraft, such as the DC-3, to provide necessary supplies. Demarcation Bay was logistically supported by the Barter Island BAR-MAIN DEW Line Station, but was operated by civilian contract workers.

=== Abandonment ===
Along with the other intermediate DEW Line Sites, Demarcation Bay Station was closed in 1963 after developments in radar technology rendered it obsolete. It has been abandoned ever since. The radars and other military buildings were removed around 2000, returning the site to a relatively natural condition. The gravel streets and the runway of the former airstrip of the station remain.

== See also ==
- Distant Early Warning Line
- Alaskan Air Command
