= Eagle Airport =

Airport in Alaska, United States

Eagle (Alaska) Airport
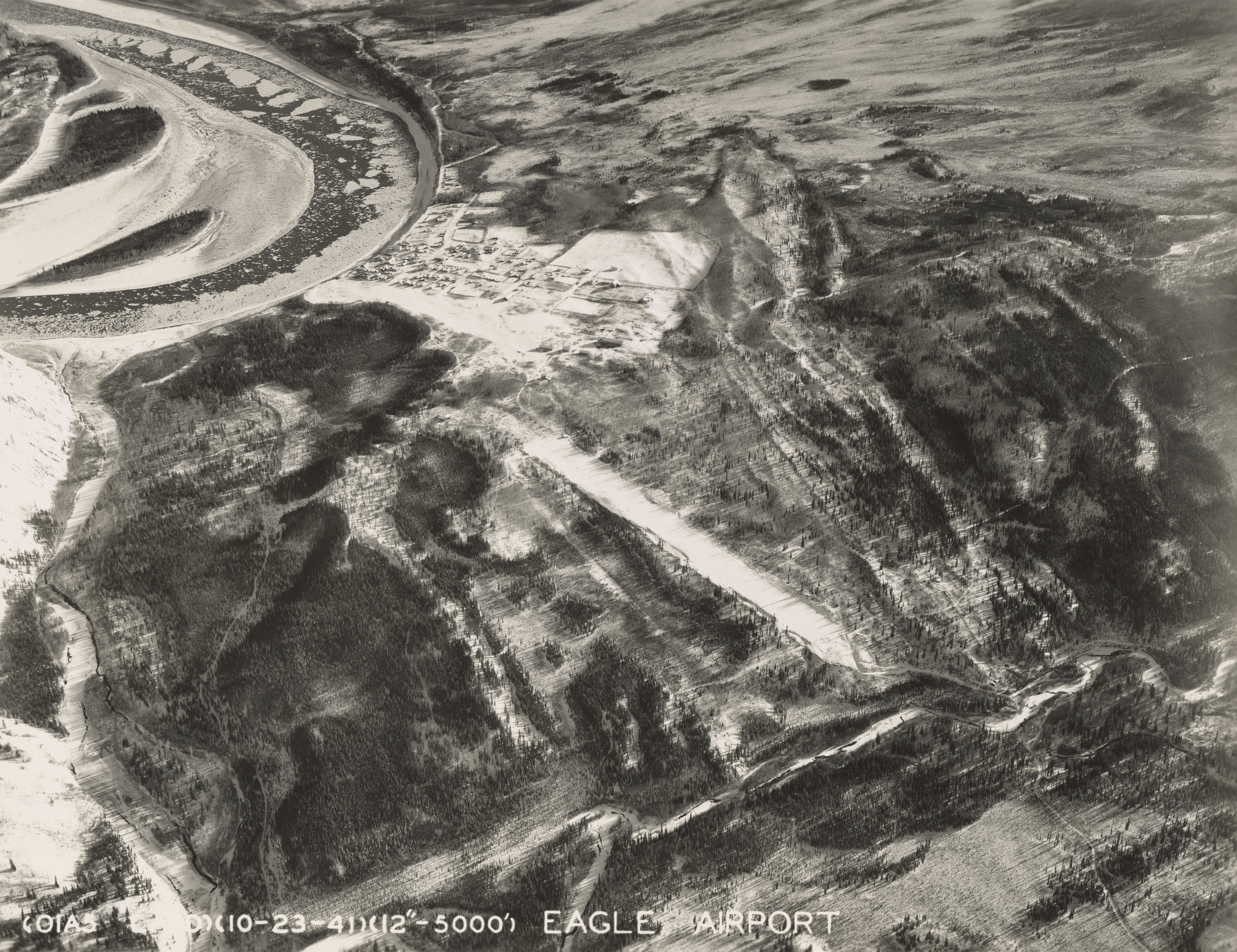
- Eagle Airport, 1941
- IATA: EAA; ICAO: PAEG; FAA LID: EAA

Summary
- Airport type: Public
- Owner: Alaska DOT&PF - Northern Region
- Serves: Eagle, Alaska
- Elevation AMSL: 908 ft (277 m)
- Coordinates: 64°46′41″N 141°08′59″W

Map
- Location of airport in Alaska EAA (the United States)

Runways
Direction	Length		Surface
Direction	ft	m	Surface
7/25	3,600	1,097	Gravel

Statistics (2016)
- Aircraft operations: 2,400 (2014)
- Based aircraft: 1
- Passengers: 1,037
- Freight: 201,000 lbs
- Source: Federal Aviation Administration; Source: Bureau of Transportation

Eagle Airport (IATA: EAA, ICAO: PAEG, FAA LID: EAA) is a state-owned public airport two miles east of Eagle, in the Southeast Fairbanks Census Area of Alaska.

== Facilities and aircraft ==
Eagle Airport covers 87 acres (35 ha) at an elevation of 908 feet (277 m) above mean sea level. Its one runway, 6/24, is gravel, 3,600 by 75 feet (1,097 x 23 m). In 2005 the airport had 2,400 aircraft operations, 83% general aviation and 17% air taxi.

== Airlines and destinations ==
Airlines	Destinations
Everts Air	Fairbanks

=== Statistics ===
Carrier shares: January – December 2016
Carrier	Passengers (arriving and departing)
Tatonduk	1,037(100.00%)

Top domestic destinations: January – December 2016
Rank	City	Airport	Passengers
1	(Alaska) Fairbanks, AK	Fairbanks International Airport	490
2	(Alaska) Fort Yukon, AK	Fort Yukon Airport	10

== See also ==
- List of airports in Alaska
