= Arctic Village Airport =

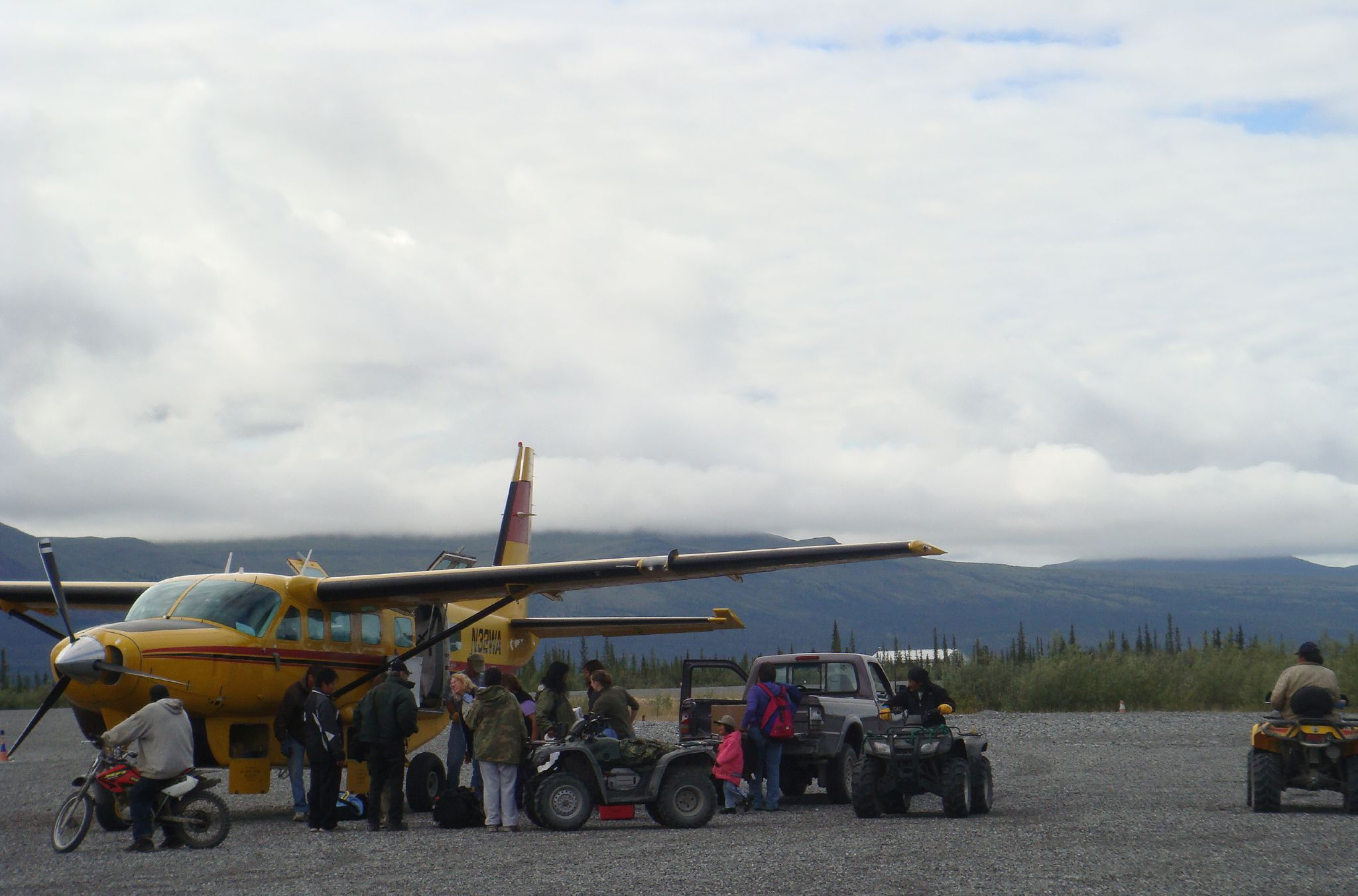
- A party of residents meet an arriving airplane at Arctic Village.
- IATA: ARC; ICAO: PARC; FAA LID: ARC

Summary
- Airport type: Public
- Owner: Venetie Tribal Government
- Serves: Arctic Village, Alaska
- Elevation AMSL: 2,092 ft (638 m)
- Coordinates: 68°06′53″N 145°34′46″W

Map
- Location of airport in Alaska

Runways
Direction	Length		Surface
Direction	ft	m	Surface
2/20	4,500	1,372	Gravel

Statistics (2025)
- Scheduled departures: 657
- Based aircraft: 0
- Passengers: 3,352
- Freight: 535,000 lbs
- Source: Federal Aviation Administration Statistics: Bureau of Transportation Statistics

Arctic Village Airport (IATA: ARC, ICAO: PARC, FAA LID: ARC) is a public use airport located one nautical mile (1.8 km) southwest of the central business district of Arctic Village, a Native American village in the Yukon-Koyukuk Census Area of the U.S. state of Alaska. It is owned by the Venetie Tribal Government.

== Facilities and aircraft ==
Arctic Village Airport has one runway designated 2/20 with a gravel surface measuring 4,500 by 75 feet (1,372 x 23 m). For the 12-month period ending December 31, 2005, the airport had 1,627 aircraft operations, an average of 135 per month: 89% air taxi and 11% general aviation.

== Airlines and destinations ==
The following airlines offer scheduled passenger service at this airport:

Airlines	Destinations
Everts Air	Fairbanks
Wright Air Service	Fairbanks, Fort Yukon, Venetie

As of 2019, Wright Air Service is flying only to Venetie (VEE) during the whole week except on Sunday.

=== Statistics ===
For 2023, there were 1,750 passenger enplanements, an increase from 1,548 in 2022 according to the FAA.

Carrier shares: January – December 2015
Carrier	Passengers (arriving and departing)
Wright Air	3,210(99.69%)
Everts Air	10(0.31%)

Top domestic destinations: January – December 2015
Rank	City	Airport	Passengers
1	Fairbanks, AK	Fairbanks International Airport (FAI)	1,300
2	Fort Yukon, AK	Fort Yukon Airport (FYU)	130
3	Venetie, AK	Venetie Airport (VEE)	120

== See also ==
- List of airports in Alaska
