= Rich International Airways =

US charter cargo & passenger airline (1970–96)

IATA	ICAO	Call sign
JN	RIA	RICHAIR
- Founded: 28 April 1970; 56 years ago incorporated in Florida
- Ceased operations: 1 September 1996; 29 years ago
- Operating bases: Miami, Florida
- Fleet size: 41
- Headquarters: Miami, Florida, United States
- Key people: William Meenan; David Sanguesa; David Rich; George E. Batchelor
- Founder: Jean Rich

Rich International Airways was primarily a United States charter and cargo airline founded by aviation pioneer Jean Rich, one of the few women in the U.S. to own and operate an airline. The air carrier was based in Miami, Florida. The airline ceased operations in 1996 and filed for bankruptcy in 1997.

== History ==
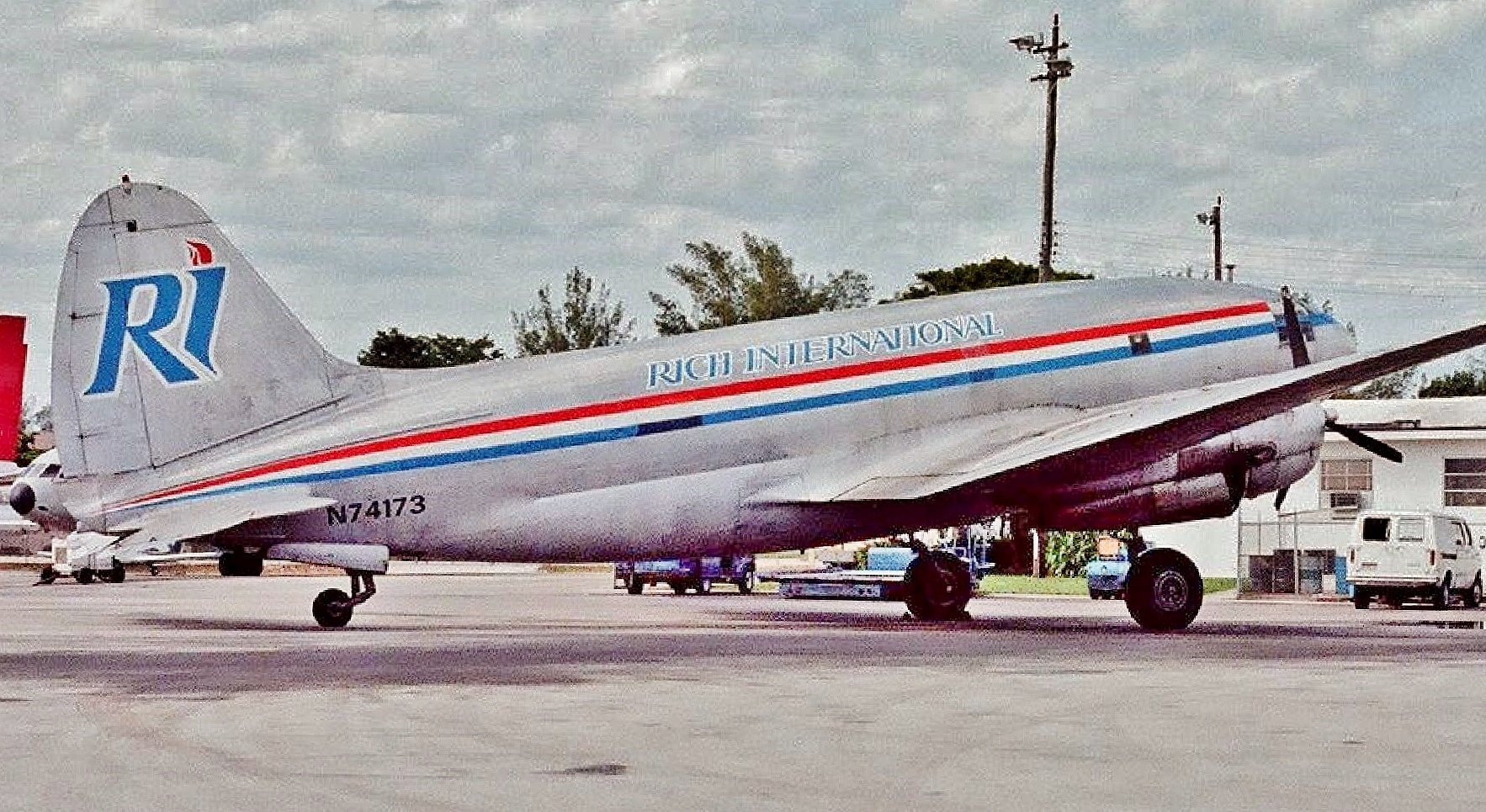
C-46 at Miami 1982

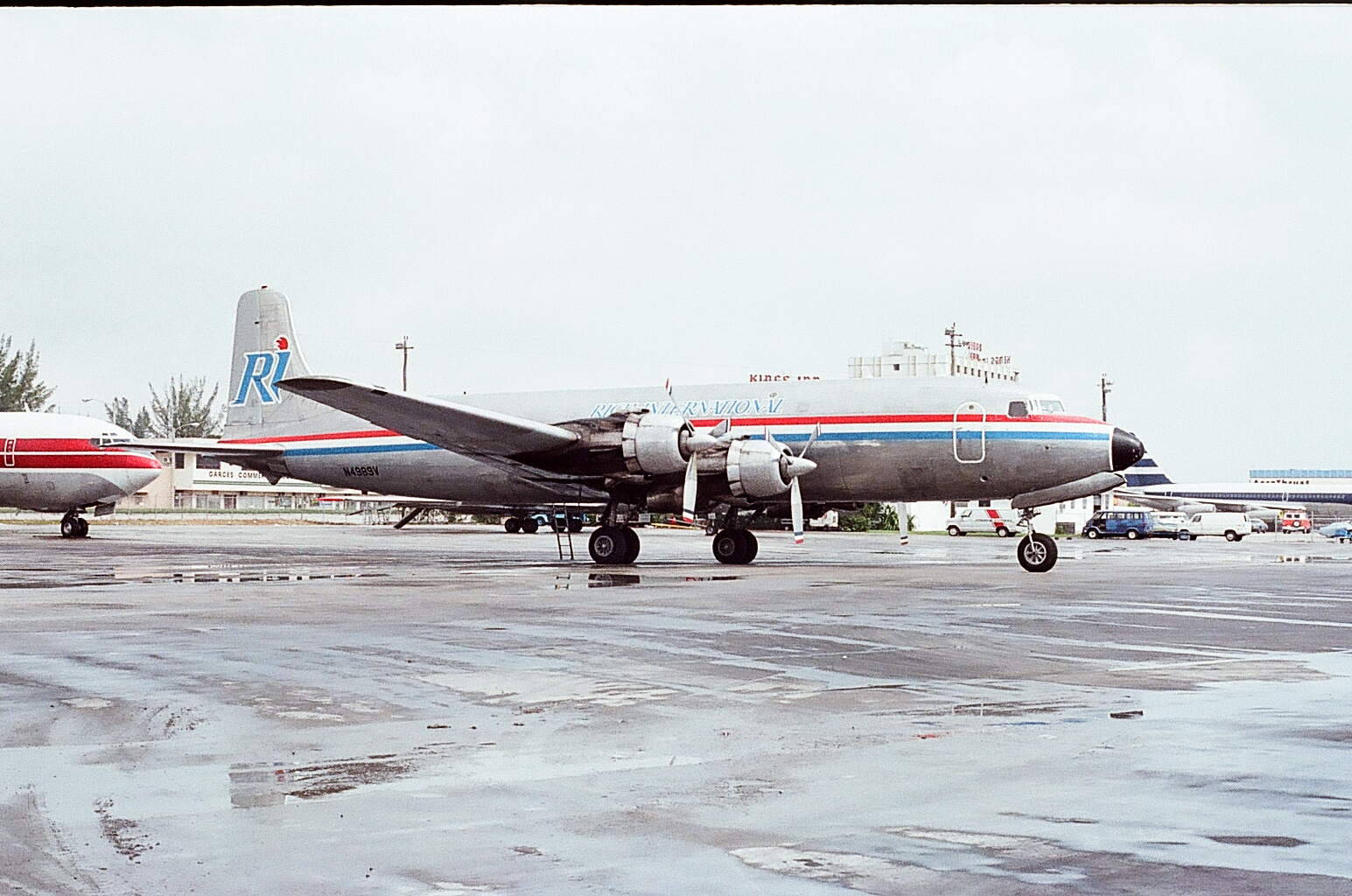
DC-6A at Miami 1982

Rich International Airways was incorporated in Florida on 28 April 1970 and started operations the same year, initially as an uncertificated carrier. The carrier flew C-46 and Beech 18 aircraft, including transporting dynamite. In 1977 the airline was certificated by the Civil Aeronautics Board (CAB) as a supplemental air carrier to fly cargo from Florida and Georgia to Canada, Mexico, the Caribbean and Central America. Later the same year, the CAB further certificated Rich to fly cargo domestically on behalf of the Department of Defense. The CAB was a now defunct Federal agency that until US airline deregulation in 1979 tightly regulated almost all commercial air transportation in the United States.

Capacity was steadily increased with the addition of Douglas DC-6 and Douglas DC-8-60 freighters.

In 1982, the carrier was granted permission to fly passenger charters, and began operations to Europe and Hawaii. However, losses from the expansion forced the company to seek Chapter 11 bankruptcy in 1983. This was followed by scrutiny from the Federal Aviation Administration, which revoked the airline's operating license due to maintenance irregularities during the DOT “white glove inspections” directed by the Hon. Elizabeth Dole in the spring of 1984. The FAA agreed to return the operating certificate with the addition of new key personnel, Director of Operations, Chief Pilot, Director of Maintenance and Director of Training.

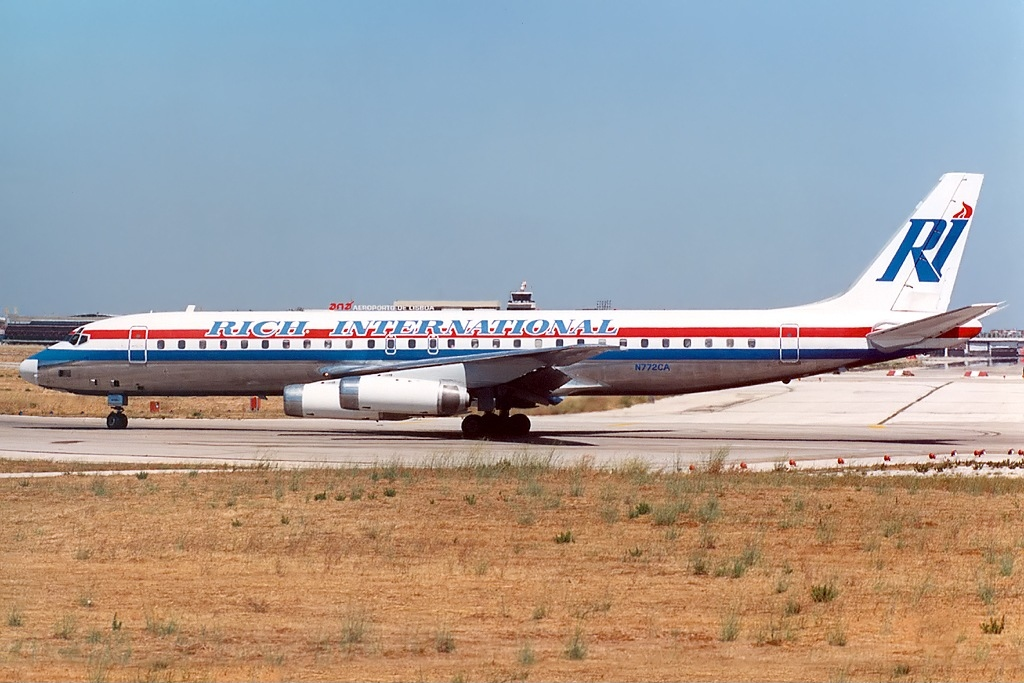
DC-8-62 at Lisbon 1990

Following the restart and new operating approvals, Miami-based George E. Batchelor invested in the company, and by 1991, Rich had successfully exited bankruptcy protection. This period of prosperity was accompanied by more expansion, including the introduction of the wide-body Lockheed L-1011 TriStar for flights to Europe. During 1995-6, Rich International operated L-1011 charter flights for cruise lines, tour operators, vacation package companies and the U.S. Department of Defense. Routes in the summer months included San Francisco (SFO to Maui (OGG) and Honolulu, Los Angeles (LAX) to Maui and Honolulu, Sacramento to Maui and Honolulu and San Diego to Honolulu, as well. Flights for cruise operators included trips to the Mediterranean and the Caribbean. Multiple charter trips operated to and from Las Vegas (LAS) from Boston, Ft.Lauderdale, Cleveland, Detroit, Minneapolis/St.Paul, Pittsburgh and South Bend, Indiana. Charter flights for the US DoD were operated to Europe, North Africa, The Middle East and the Far East. According to the Official Airline Guide (OAG), in the spring of 1996 Rich was operating scheduled passenger service with L-1011 aircraft nonstop twice a week between Anchorage (ANC) and Honolulu (HNL).

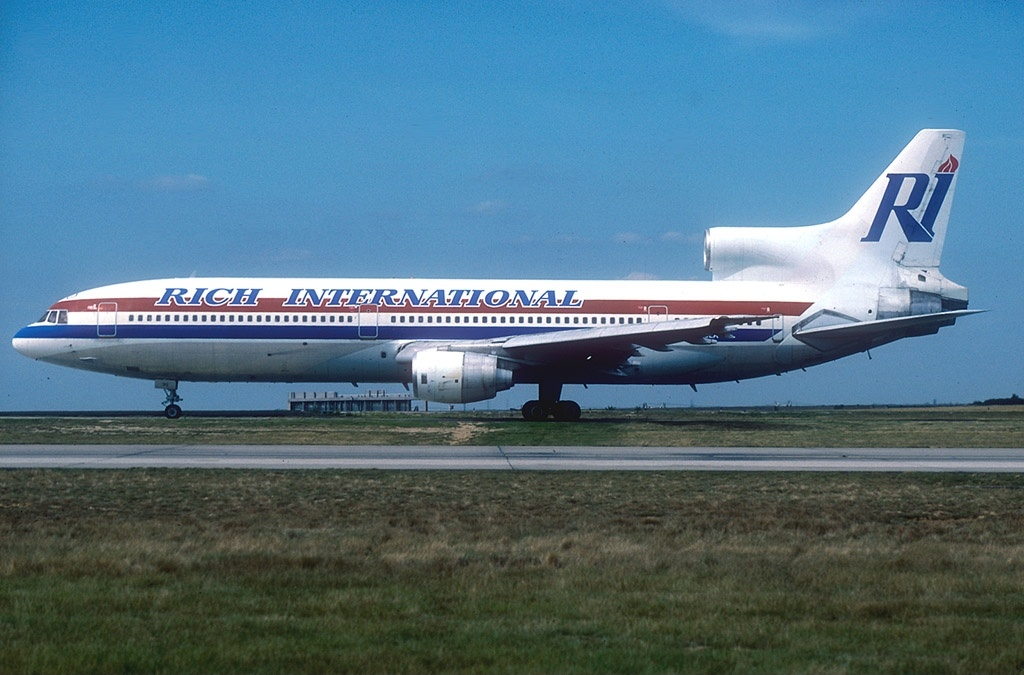
L-1011 at Paris 1993

In the wake of the crash of ValuJet Flight 592 in the Everglades, much media attention was given to the FAA's poor oversight of the ValuJet's rapid, unsustainable growth and multiple safety violations. The FAA then grounded Rich for alleged maintenance irregularities. Operations ceased on September 1, 1996. The US aviation authority FAA wanted to allow flight operations until February 1997, but the US Department of Transportation refused to approve and made a license dependent on numerous conditions. In February 1997, Rich International announced its bankruptcy and was dissolved. It was no longer able to meet the requirements of the Ministry of Transport economically. The aircraft and the entire inventory were auctioned in July 1997.

The following year, the FAA released findings stating that the grounding of Rich may have been an overreaction, and that minor maintenance issues may have been blown out of proportion in the public hysteria following the ValuJet crash.

The company provided bi-monthly logistical support flights containing food, machinery parts, and delivery of US Mail to Coast Guard LORAN Station South Caicos, British West Indies and Coast Guard LORAN Station San Salvador, Bahamas until 1981 when those stations were decommissioned.

== Fleet ==
The Rich International Airways fleet consisted of the following aircraft:

Rich International Airways fleet
Aircraft	Total	Introduced	Retired	Notes
Beechcraft King Air	1	1983	1983	
Boeing 727-100	1	1990	1991	
Curtiss C-46 Commando	7	1970	1984	
Douglas DC-6A	4	1973	1987	
Douglas DC-8-33F	1	1980	1986	
Douglas DC-8-55CF	4	1981	1984	
Douglas DC-8-62	6	1983	1990	
Douglas DC-8-62F	2	1990	1997	
Douglas DC-8-63	1	1992	1997	
Lockheed L-1011-1 Tristar	12	1991	1997	
Lockheed L-1011-200 Tristar	1	1996	1997	
Lockheed L-1011-500 Tristar	1	1996	1997	

== Accidents and incidents ==
- February 28, 1994, during takeoff at Fairbanks International Airport for a ferry flight to Miami, a Lockheed L-1011-1 Tristar (registered N303EA) experienced a mechanical power loss on the number 3 and number 1 engines and an internal fire on the number 1 engine. The takeoff was aborted and during the taxi back, the fire on the number 1 engine was extinguished. None of the 3 occupants on board were injured.

== See also ==
- Supplemental air carrier
- List of defunct airlines of the United States

== Bibliography ==
- Hengi, B.I. (2000). Vergangen, Vergessen, Vorbei [Airlines Remembered: Over 200 Airlines of the Past, Described and Illustrated in Colour]. Neil Lewis, translator. Leicester, England: Midland Publishing. ISBN 978-1-85780-091-3.
