= Everts Air =

Airline of the United States

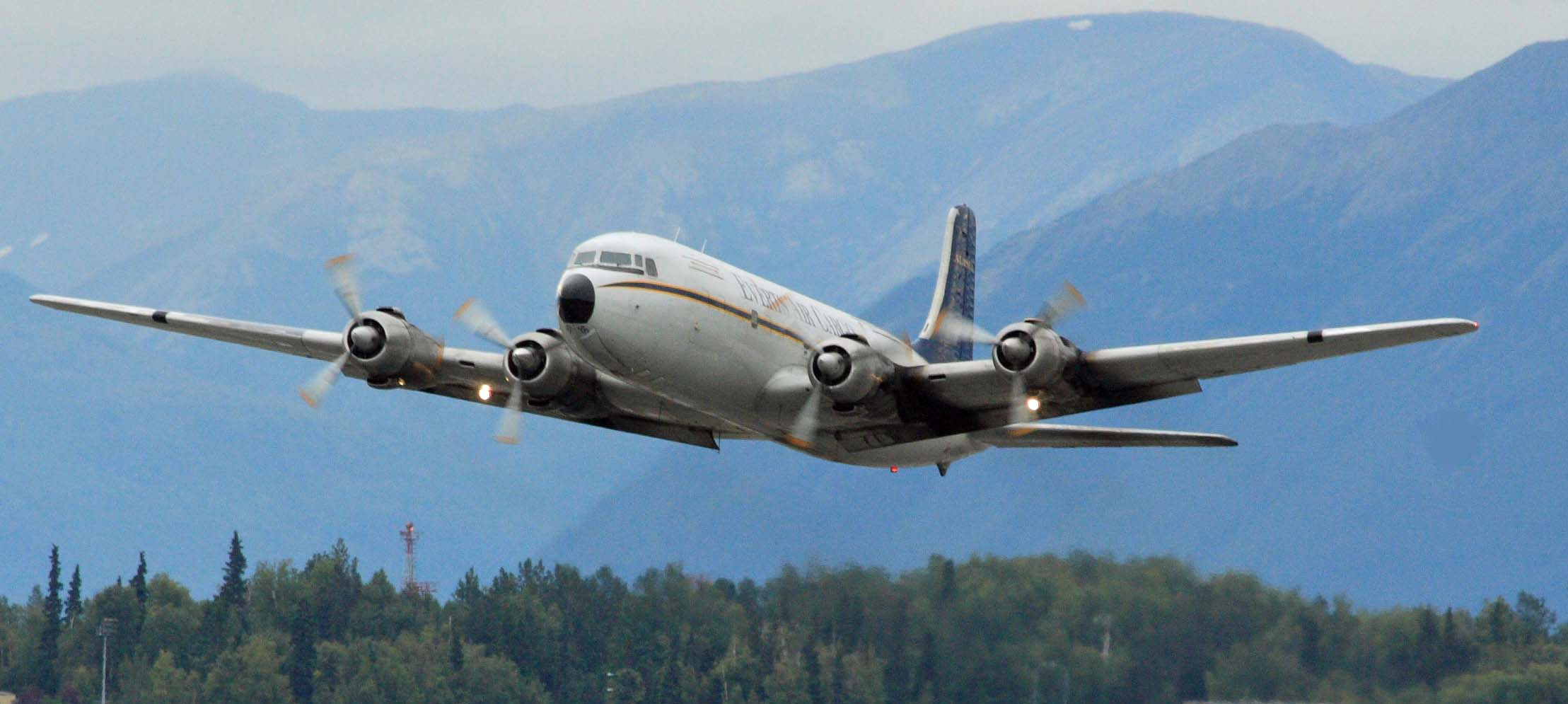
IATA	ICAO	Call sign
5V	VTS	EVERTS
- Founded: 1978; 48 years ago
- AOC #: FXGA030A
- Hubs: Fairbanks International Airport
- Secondary hubs: Ted Stevens Anchorage International Airport
- Frequent-flyer program: N/A
- Fleet size: 38 (active); 12 (in storage)
- Destinations: see details
- Parent company: Tatonduk Outfitters Limited
- Headquarters: Fairbanks, Alaska, United States
- Key people: Robert W. Everts
- Website: www.evertsair.com

Everts Air is an American airline based in Fairbanks, Alaska, United States. It operates scheduled and charter airline cargo as well as passenger services within Alaska and Canada. Its main base is Fairbanks International Airport with its major hub at Ted Stevens Anchorage International Airport. The company slogan is Legendary Aircraft. Extraordinary Service.

== History ==
A family-owned business run by Robert W. Everts who created Tatonduk Flying Service in 1977 with a single Cessna 180 aircraft to provide air transportation for miners in the remote places of Alaska. Since 1980, his father, Clifford R. Everts, has owned and operated Everts Air Fuel Inc., which specializes in airlifting flammable and hazardous materials.

In 1993 the airline, originally Federal Aviation Regulations Part 135 certified (Commuter and On-Demand Operations), became FAR Part 121 certified (Domestic, Flag, and Supplemental Operations) as Tatonduk Outfitters Limited purchased Everts Air. With the introduction of larger aircraft like the Douglas DC-6B and Curtiss-Wright C-46 Commando the company split between Everts Air Alaska and Everts Air Cargo.

== Operating the Douglas DC-6 ==
Since Northern Air Cargo abandoned their regular service with the Douglas DC-6, Everts Air Cargo is the last airline in the United States to operate scheduled flights with a rather large fleet of 60-year-old piston-powered aircraft. In a 2007 video interview, the Anchorage Station Manager stated that the DC-6 was still considered to be a valuable aircraft for operations in the harsh conditions of Alaska, with excellent landing and takeoff performance on gravel runways. The downside is the difficulty to find Avgas and the maintenance labor cost. Everts Air Cargo estimates a ratio of 12 hours of maintenance for every single flying hour. Spare parts could also be a problem but Everts Air Cargo anticipates they will have enough in stock to keep the last DC-6 flying beyond 2020.

== Zero Gravity Corporation Boeing 727 ==
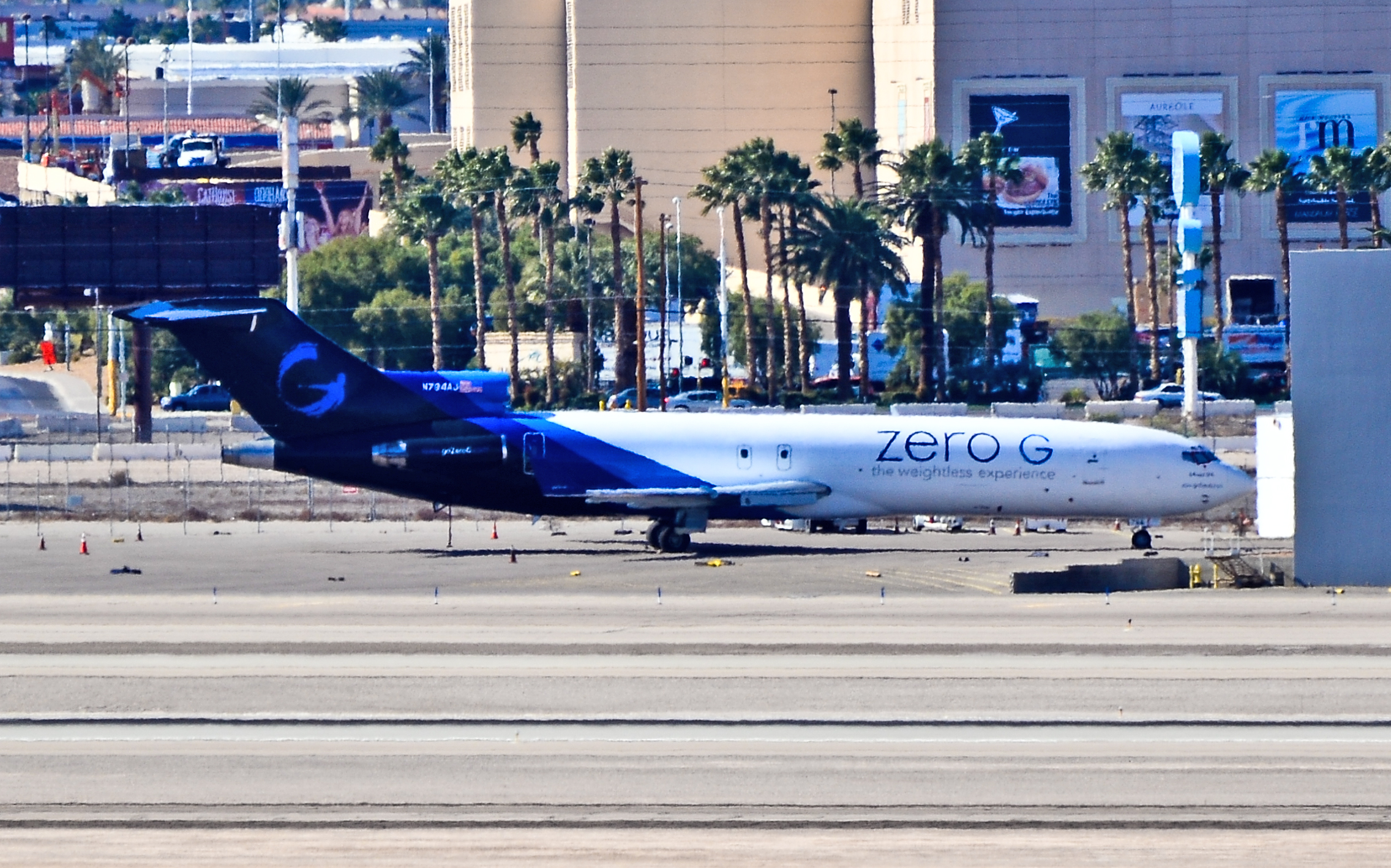
Boeing 727

Since 2015 Everts Air has operated a Boeing 727-227F for the Zero Gravity Corporation (also known as ZERO-G), which previously operated with Amerijet International. The aircraft is based in the Contiguous United States and operates weightless flights. Unlike NASA, ZERO-G is governed under Part 121 of FAA regulations, enabling the company to cater to both tourists and researchers alike. Everts revoked Zero’s-G’s access to their permit on August 18, 2025.

== Destinations ==
As of October 2011 Everts Air operates scheduled freight and passengers services to the following domestic destinations:

- Allakaket (AET) - Allakaket Airport
- Anaktuvuk Pass (AKP) - Anaktuvuk Pass Airport
- Anchorage (ANC) - Ted Stevens Anchorage International Airport (hub)
- Aniak (ANI) - Aniak Airport
- Arctic Village (ARC) - Arctic Village Airport
- Barrow (BRW) - Wiley Post–Will Rogers Memorial Airport
- Beaver (WBQ) - Beaver Airport
- Bethel (BET) - Bethel Airport
- Bettles (BTT) - Bettles Airport
- Dillingham (DLG) - Dillingham Airport
- Eagle (EAA) - Eagle Airport
- Emmonak (EMK) - Emmonak Airport
- Fairbanks (FAI) - Fairbanks International Airport (hub)
- Fort Yukon (FYU) - Fort Yukon Airport
- Galena (GAL) - Edward G. Pitka Sr. Airport
- Iliamna (ILI) - Iliamna Airport
- King Salmon (AKN) - King Salmon Airport (hub)
- Kotzebue (OTZ) - Ralph Wien Memorial Airport
- Lake Minchumina (MHM/LMA) - Minchumina Airport
- Nome (OME) - Nome Airport
- Prudhoe Bay (SCC) - Deadhorse Airport
- St. Mary's (KSM) - St. Mary's Airport
- Unalakleet (UNK) - Unalakleet Airport
- Venetie (VEE) - Venetie Airport

== Fleet ==
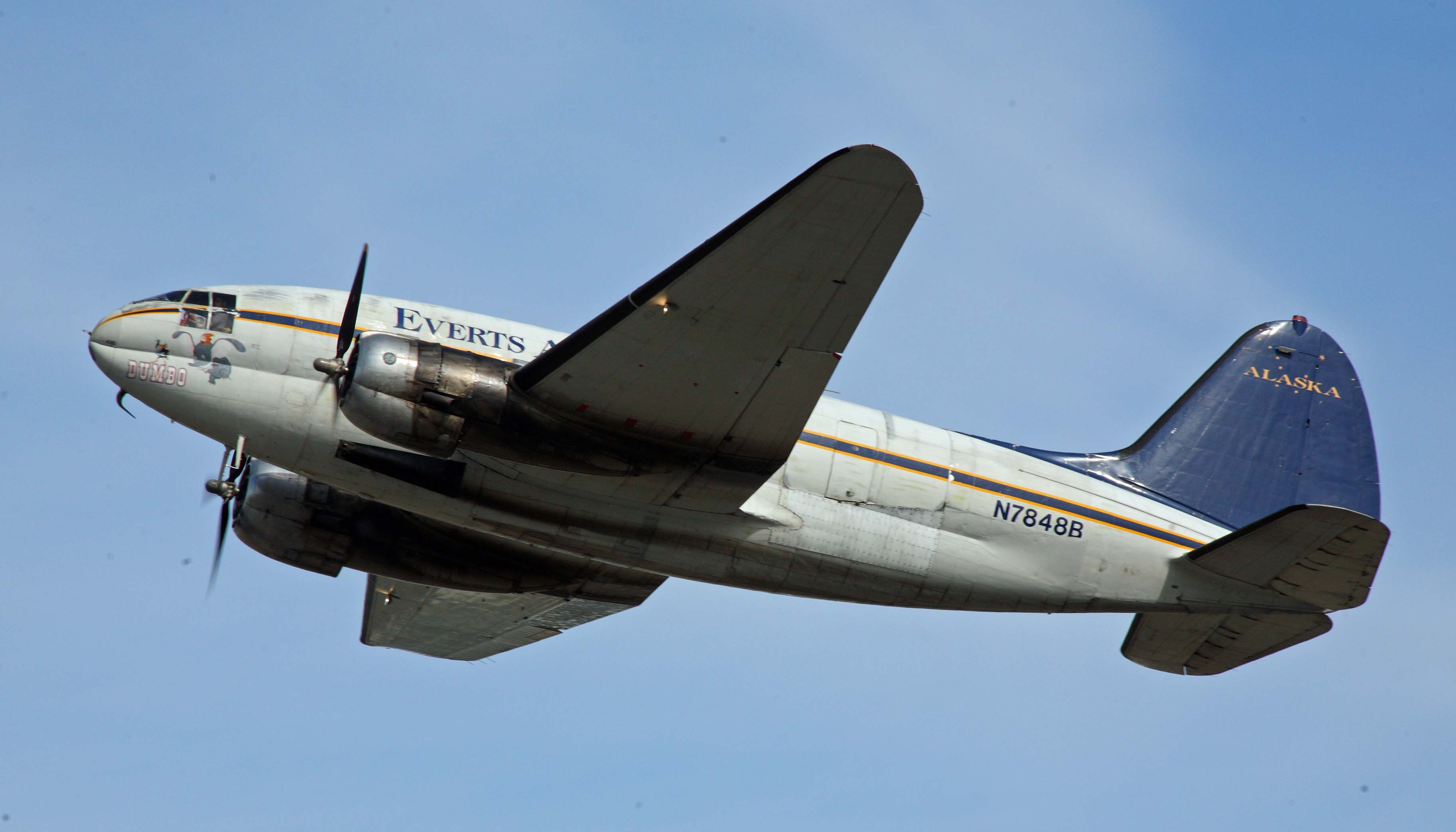
Everts Air Cargo C-46

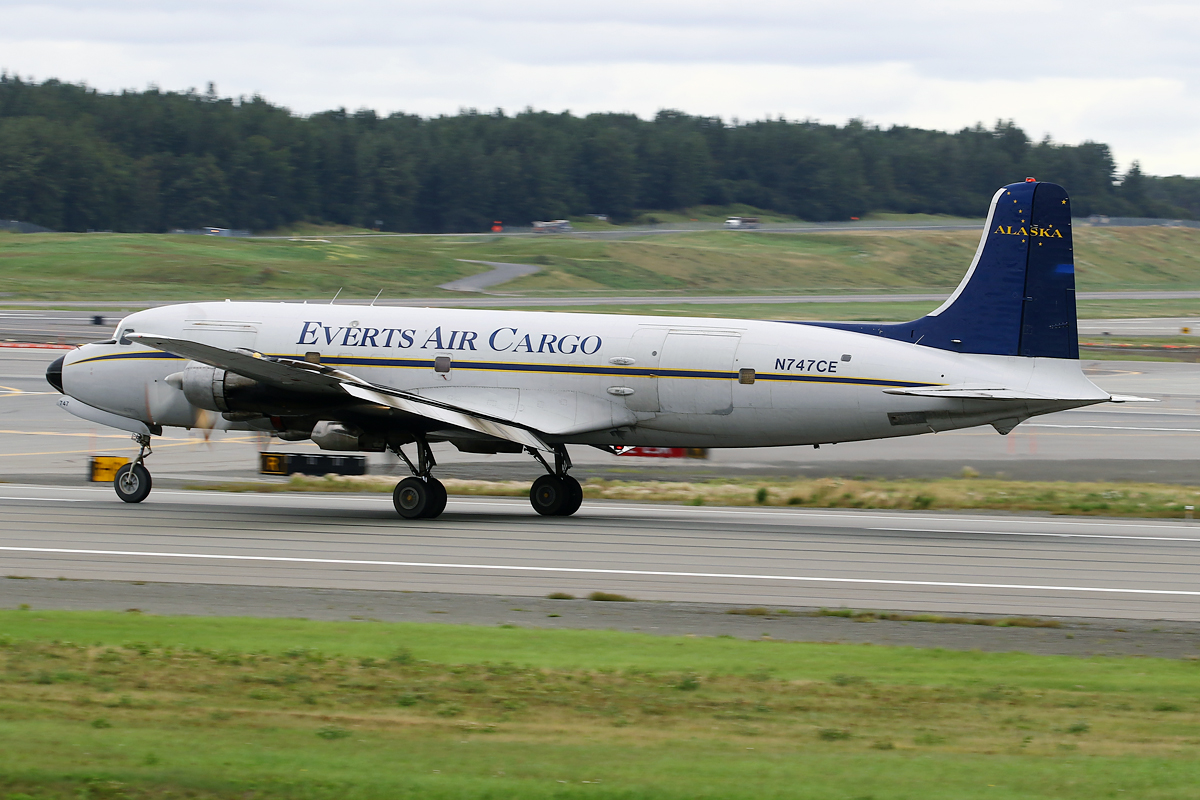
Everts Air Cargo Douglas DC-6

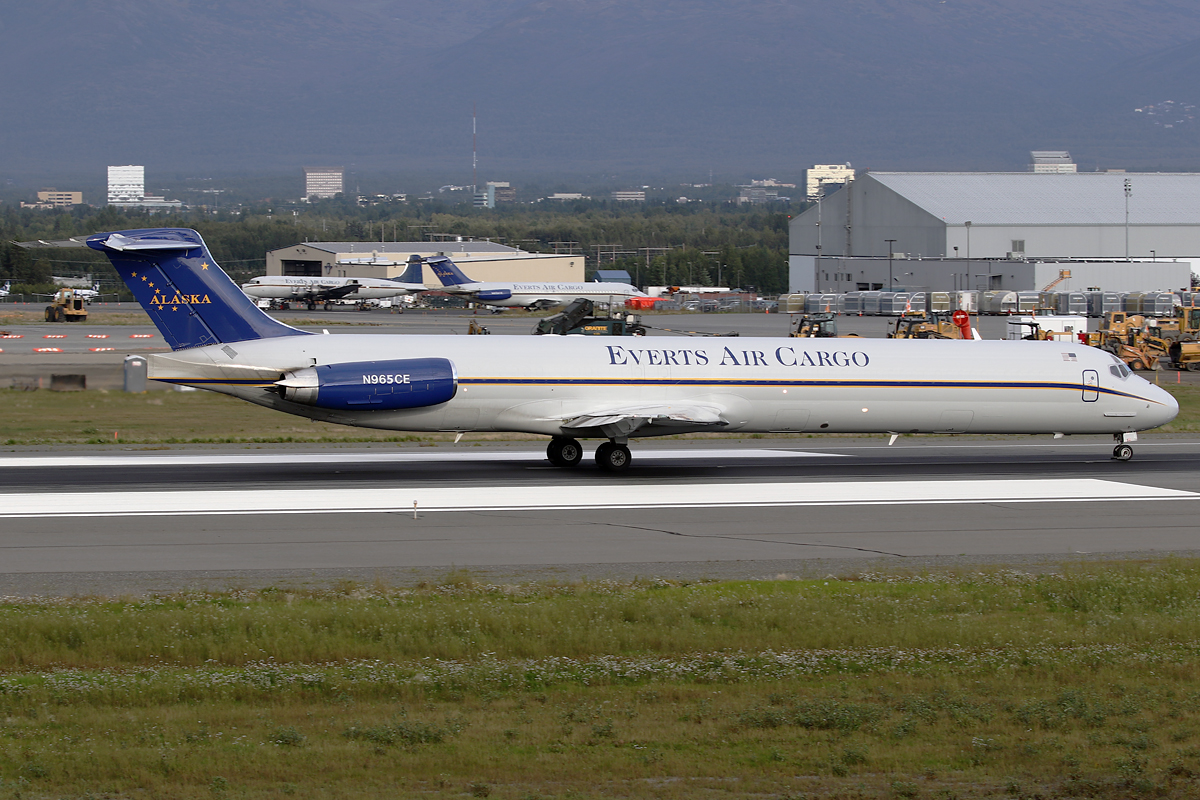
Everts Air Cargo MD-83

As of October 2025 the Everts Air fleet includes:

- 2 Air Tractor AT-802 configured to carry fuel for Everts Air Fuel operations
- 1 Boeing 727-227F operated for Zero Gravity Corporation
- 1 McDonnell Douglas MD-82
- 5 McDonnell Douglas MD-83
- 3 McDonnell Douglas MD-88 (2 currently parked)
- 2 Cessna 408 SkyCourier
- 3 British Aerospace BAe-146-300 (All currently parked)
- 3 Cessna 208 Caravans
- 3 Pilatus PC-12
- 1 Curtiss C-46
- 4 Douglas DC-6

Previously the airline had operated:

- 2 McDonnell Douglas MD-82
- 1 McDonnell Douglas MD-83
- 6 Embraer EMB-120 Brasilia
- 4 McDonnell Douglas DC-9-30
- 1 McDonnell Douglas DC-9-40

In July 2020 Everts Air Cargo acquired six Cessna 208 at Ravn Alaska's bankruptcy auction.

== Incidents ==
- March 3, 1992: a Douglas DC-6BF of Everts Air Fuel (aircraft registration N151) overran the only 960 meter long, ice-covered runway at Selawik Airport (Alaska, USA) with a light tailwind. The reverse thrust failed and the aircraft came to a stop on a frozen river with its undercarriage collapsed. It was damaged beyond repair. All three crew members, the only passengers on the cargo flight, survived the accident.
- October 4, 2000: a Curtiss C-46F Commando of Everts Air Fuel (N1822M) collided with a tree while taxiing after landing at the Port Alsworth Airfield (Alaska, USA). No one was injured. The aircraft was damaged, possibly beyond repair.
- December 20, 2000: a Curtiss C-46 of Everts Air (N1419Z) was delivering around 7,800 liters of fuel to the Nondalton (Alaska) runway. On the return flight to Kenai Airport, the aircraft was flown into a mountain at an altitude of 800 meters in bad weather. Both pilots were killed in this CFIT (Controlled flight into terrain).
- January 31, 2001: a Douglas DC-6B of Everts Air Fuel (N4390F) crashed while landing at Donlin Creek Airstrip (Alaska, USA). The aircraft, loaded with 18,500 liters of fuel oil, landed relatively hard on the 7% uphill slope of the 1,600-meter long runway that was covered in snow, making it difficult to see clearly. Shortly after touchdown, the left wing broke off the fuselage. The aircraft left the runway and was destroyed. All three crew members, the only passengers on the cargo flight, survived the accident.
- July 2, 2013: the right main landing gear of a Curtiss C-46F Commando belonging to the US airline Everts Air Fuel (N1837M) collapsed after landing at Fairbanks Airport (Alaska, USA). The cause was a fatigue fracture. Both pilots, the only passengers on the test flight, survived the accident. The aircraft was damaged, possibly beyond repair.
- August 1, 2019: A Douglas C-118A Liftmaster (registration N451CE) encountered an accident while landing at Candle 2 Airport, Alaska. The aircraft's right main landing gear struck a dirt berm near the runway threshold, resulting in the separation of the right main landing gear assembly. The plane veered off the runway, causing substantial damage to the fuselage. All three crew members survived without injuries.
