= Fairbanks International Airport =

Airport in Fairbanks, Alaska, USA

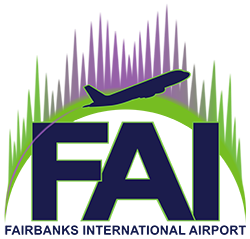

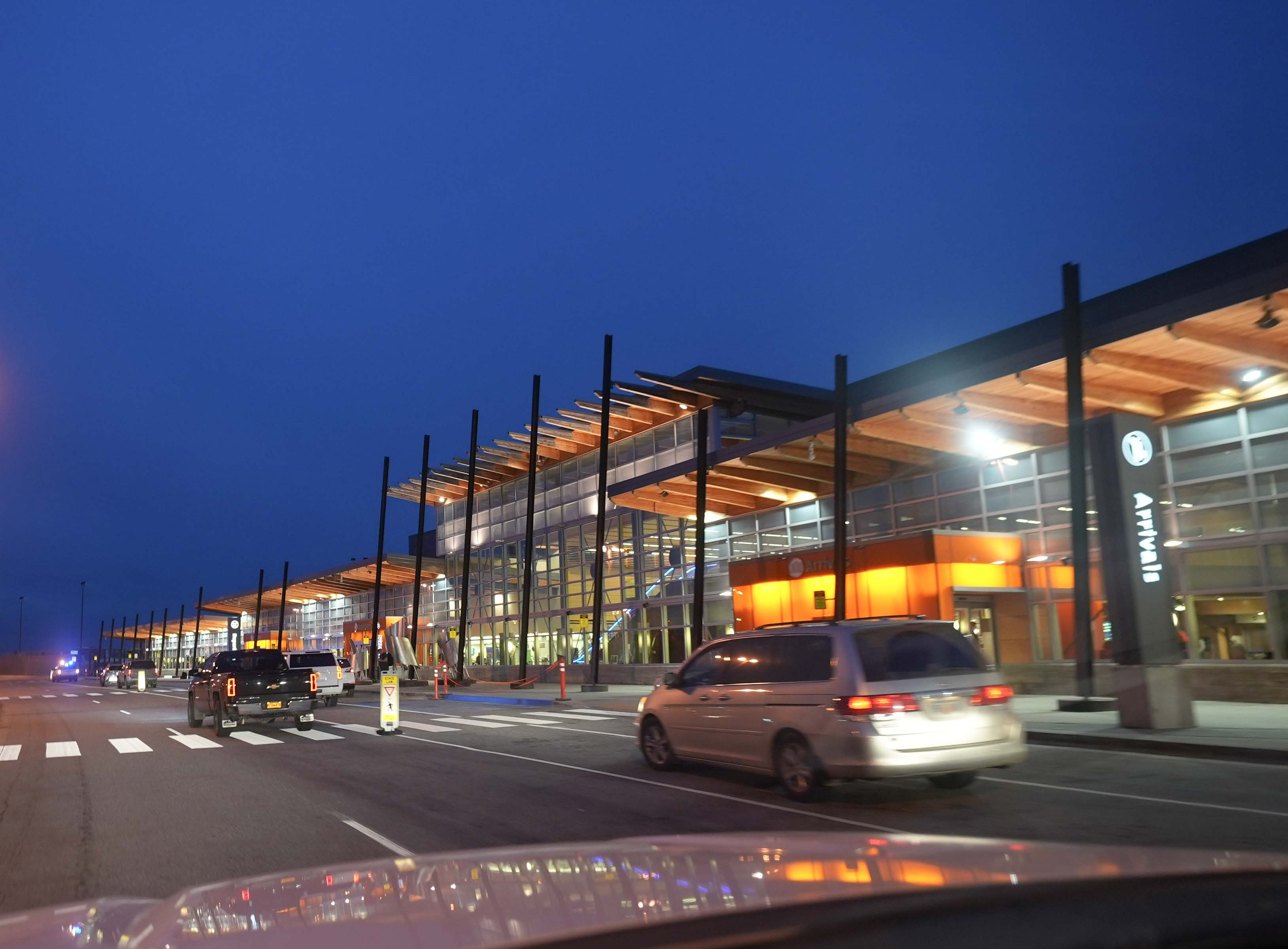
- IATA: FAI; ICAO: PAFA; FAA LID: FAI

Summary
- Airport type: Public
- Owner: State of Alaska DOT&PF
- Serves: Fairbanks, Alaska
- Location: South Van Horn, Alaska
- Hub for: Everts Air; Warbelow's Air Ventures; Wright Air Service
- Elevation AMSL: 439 ft (134 m)
- Coordinates: 64°48′54″N 147°51′23″W
- Website: dot.alaska.gov/faiiap/

Maps
- FAA airport diagram
- Interactive map of Fairbanks International Airport

Runways
Direction	Length		Surface
Direction	ft	m	Surface
2L/20R	11,800	3,597	Asphalt
2R/20L	4,510	1,375	Asphalt
2/20	2,900	884	Gravel/Ski Strip
2W/20W	5,400	1,646	Water/Winter Ski Strip

Statistics (2025 (Fiscal Year))
- Passengers: 1,195,288
- Aircraft landings: 20,377
- Total cargo (lbs.): 23,233,000 .
- Source: Federal Aviation Administration; Source: Bureau of Transportation

Fairbanks International Airport (IATA: FAI, ICAO: PAFA, FAA LID: FAI) is a state-owned public-use airport located three miles (5 km) southwest of the central business district of Fairbanks, a city in the Fairbanks North Star Borough of the U.S. state of Alaska. It is located in the South Van Horn census-designated place. Fairbanks was the smallest city in the United States with regularly scheduled non-stop international flights, as Condor offered weekly flights to Frankfurt during the summer tourist season. Air North is now the only international airline to offer scheduled charters with flights (to Canada).

== History ==
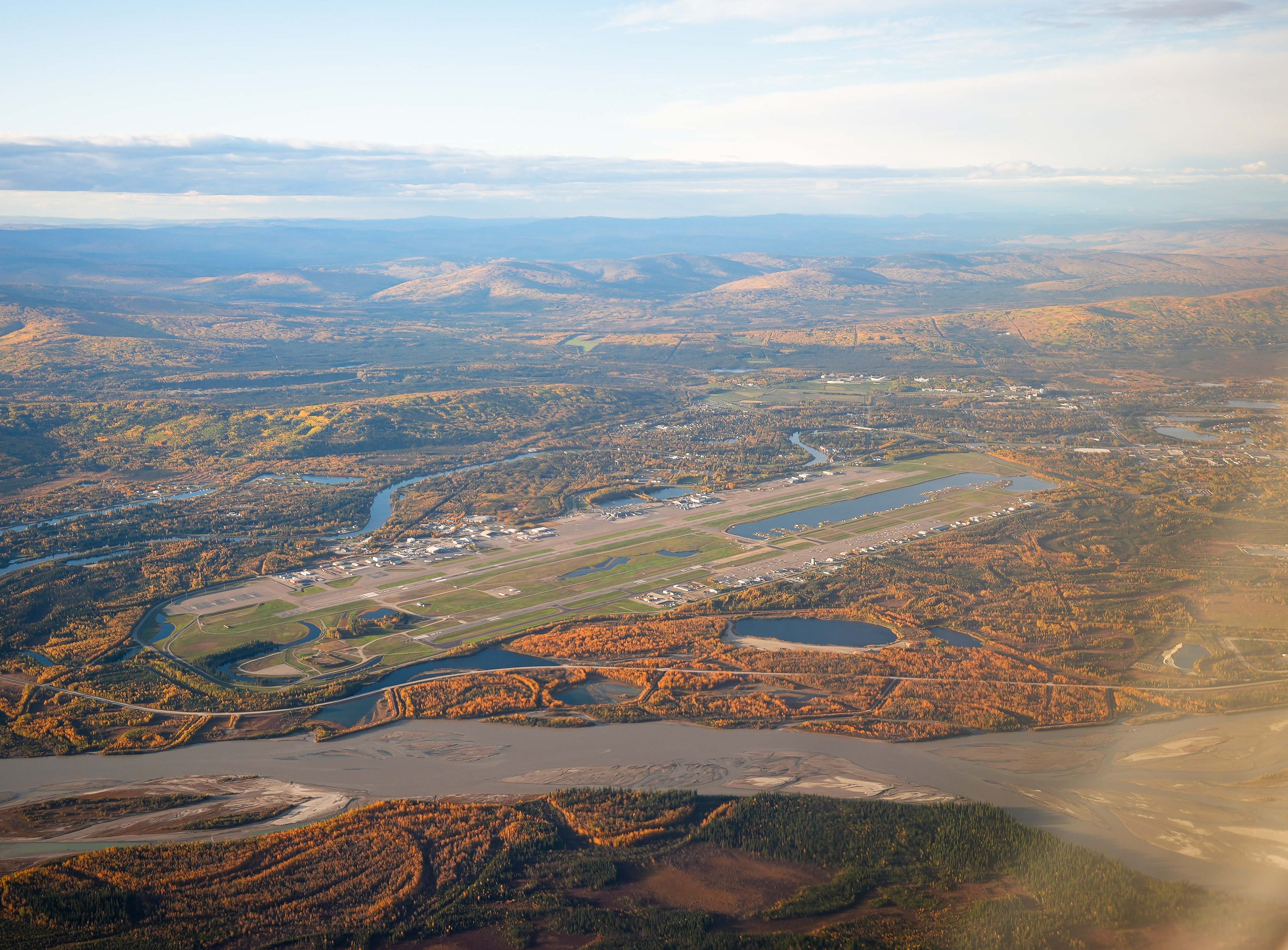
Aerial view of Fairbanks International Airport

=== Early years ===
The airport opened in 1951 and took over existing scheduled airline traffic to Fairbanks, which had previously used Ladd Army Airfield. Alaska Airlines used Fairbanks as its main hub in the 1950s, with service to Seattle and Portland as well as intrastate service to Anchorage, Nome and other destinations. By 1967, however, the airline shifted its Alaska hub to Anchorage; its Anchorage-Fairbanks service continues to this day. In the mid-1970s, following the development of the Trans-Alaska Pipeline, Alaska Airlines and Braniff International offered "interchange service" (see transport hub) between Fairbanks and Houston via Anchorage, Seattle and Dallas. In 1982, following airline deregulation, Alaska Airlines and American Airlines began a similar interchange service using Boeing 727s.

Pan American World Airways had also served Fairbanks since 1932. The station was originally opened after the acquisition of Pacific International Airways and used for short-haul services to Juneau, Seattle, Ketchikan, Whitehorse and other destinations. Pan Am intended to use Fairbanks as a stop for service to Asia as early as 1931, but initial difficulty in negotiating landing rights with the Soviet Union, followed by the outbreak of World War II, delayed these plans until decades later. Pan Am service to Fairbanks continued through the opening of FAI until 1965, when the Civil Aeronautics Board terminated Pan Am's rights to serve Alaska.

Pan American World Airways eventually used Fairbanks as a stopover for transpacific service from New York and Seattle to Tokyo starting in September 1969. In 1974, Pan Am agreed to transfer its Fairbanks–Seattle service to Western Airlines, and requested that the CAB allow its New York–Tokyo service to be suspended from April 1975. Other carriers, such as Japan Airlines and Korean Air, began to use Fairbanks as a technical stop for transpacific cargo flights in the late 1970s.

=== Development since the 2000s ===
Condor started a seasonal route to Frankfurt in May 2001. The inbound flight stopped in Whitehorse, Canada, and the outbound one was nonstop. On October 11, 2009, the airport completed a new terminal and began demolishing the old terminal which was built in 1948. The new terminal is built around the modern TSA standards. In addition to architectural design and better security, the main terminal now has six jet-bridges (up from the former five). The 29,063-square-foot (2,700 m^{2}) of custom-unitized curtain wall was designed and supplied by Overgaard Ltd. Hong Kong. The special design incorporates double low-e triple glazing. The new building's footprint is smaller than the old building.

== Facilities ==
=== Terminal ===
The terminal building, situated on the northwest side of the airport, contains eight gates: two for commuter carriers and six for larger carriers.

=== Runways ===
Fairbanks International Airport covers an area of 3,470 acres (1,404 ha) at an elevation of 439 feet (134 m) above mean sea level. It has four runways:

- Runway 2L/20R: 11,800 by 150 feet (3,597 x 46 m), surface: asphalt
- Runway 2R/20L: 4,510 by 75 feet (1,375 x 23 m), surface: asphalt
- Runway 2/20: 2,900 by 75 feet (884 x 23 m), surface: gravel/ski strip
- Runway 2W/20W: 5,400 by 100 feet (1,646 x 30 m), surface: water/winter ski strip

== Airlines and destinations ==
=== Passenger ===
Airlines	Destinations	Refs
Air North	Seasonal charter: Dawson City	
Alaska Airlines	Anchorage, Seattle/Tacoma; Seasonal: Portland (OR)	
Delta Air Lines	Seattle/Tacoma; Seasonal: Minneapolis/St. Paul	
Everts Air	Anaktuvuk Pass, Arctic Village, Eagle, Fort Yukon, Galena, Huslia, Kaktovik/Barter Island, Kaltag, Nulato, Ruby, Venetie	
United Airlines	Seasonal: Chicago–O'Hare, Denver	
Warbelow's Air Ventures	Beaver, Central, Circle, Manley Hot Springs, Minto, Rampart, Stevens Village	
Wright Air Service	Allakaket, Anaktuvuk Pass, Arctic Village, Bettles, Birch Creek, Chalkyitsik, Deadhorse/Prudhoe Bay, Fort Yukon, Galena, Healy Lake, Hughes, Huslia, Kaktovik/Barter Island, Kaltag, Koyukuk, Lake Minchumina, Nulato, Ruby, Tanana, Venetie	

=== Cargo ===
Airlines	Destinations
Amazon Air	Portland (OR), Spokane
FedEx Feeder operated by Empire Airlines	Anchorage

== Statistics ==
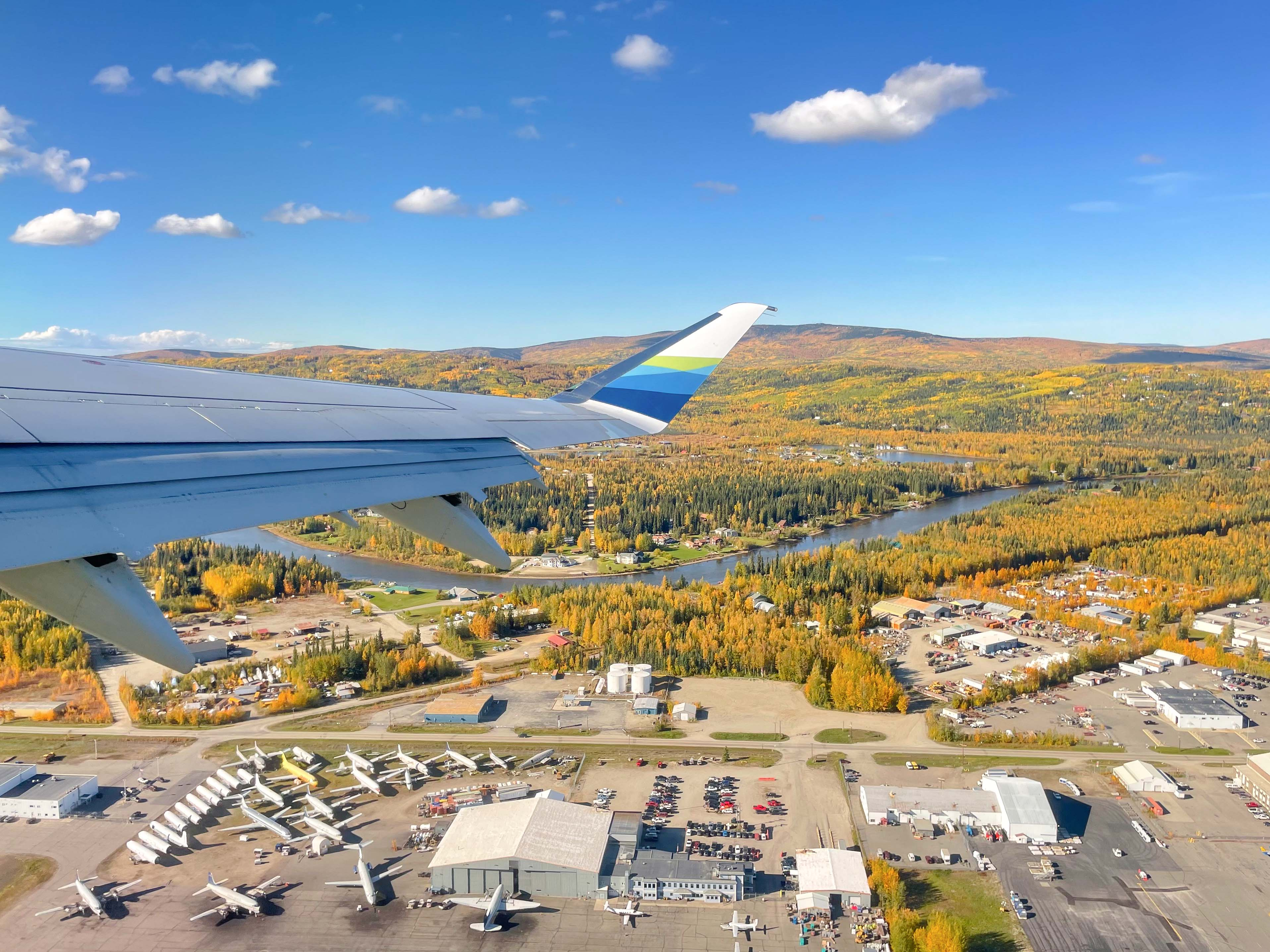
Onboard an Alaska Airlines aircraft departing Fairbanks in 2021

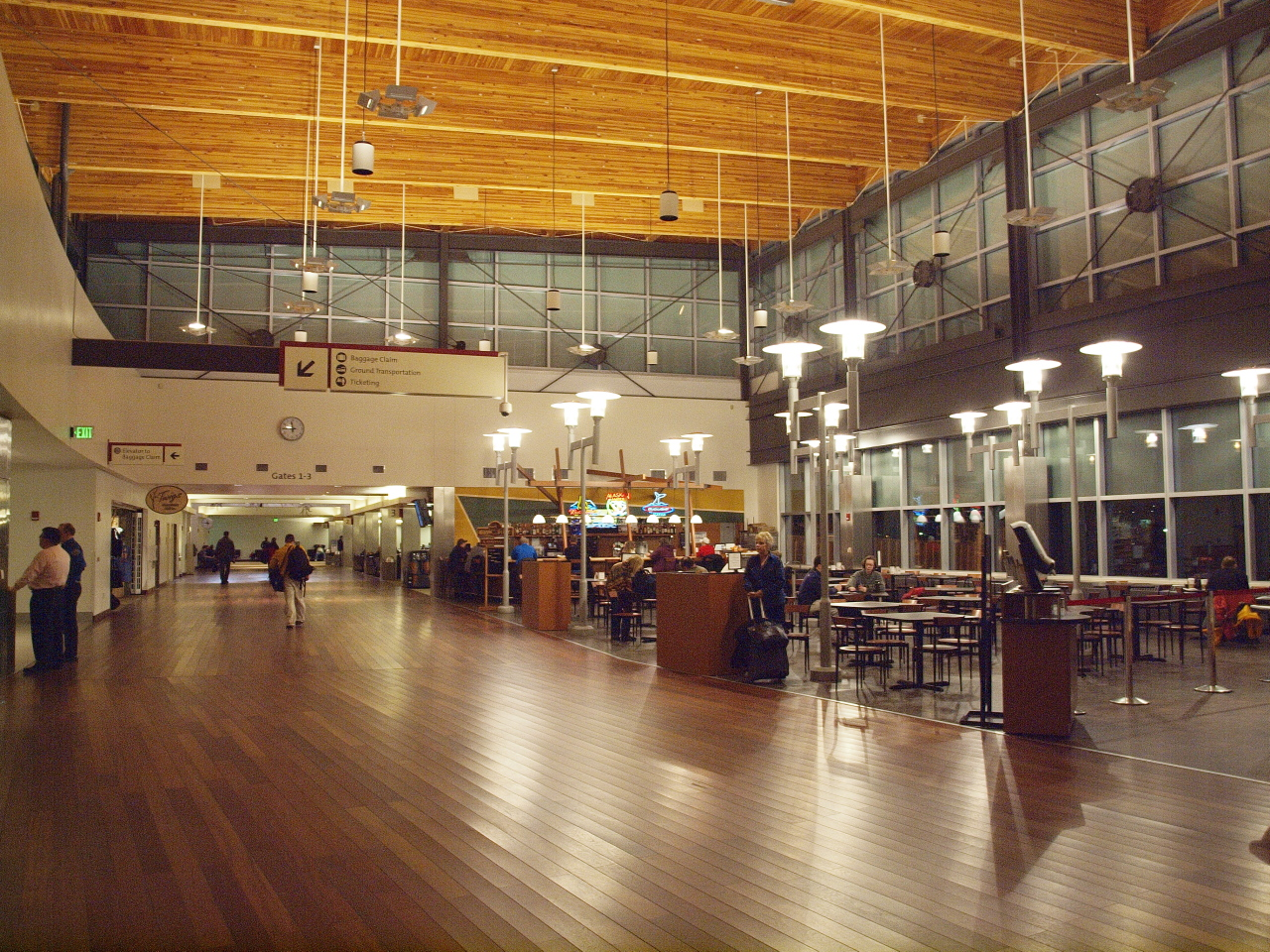
Terminal interior

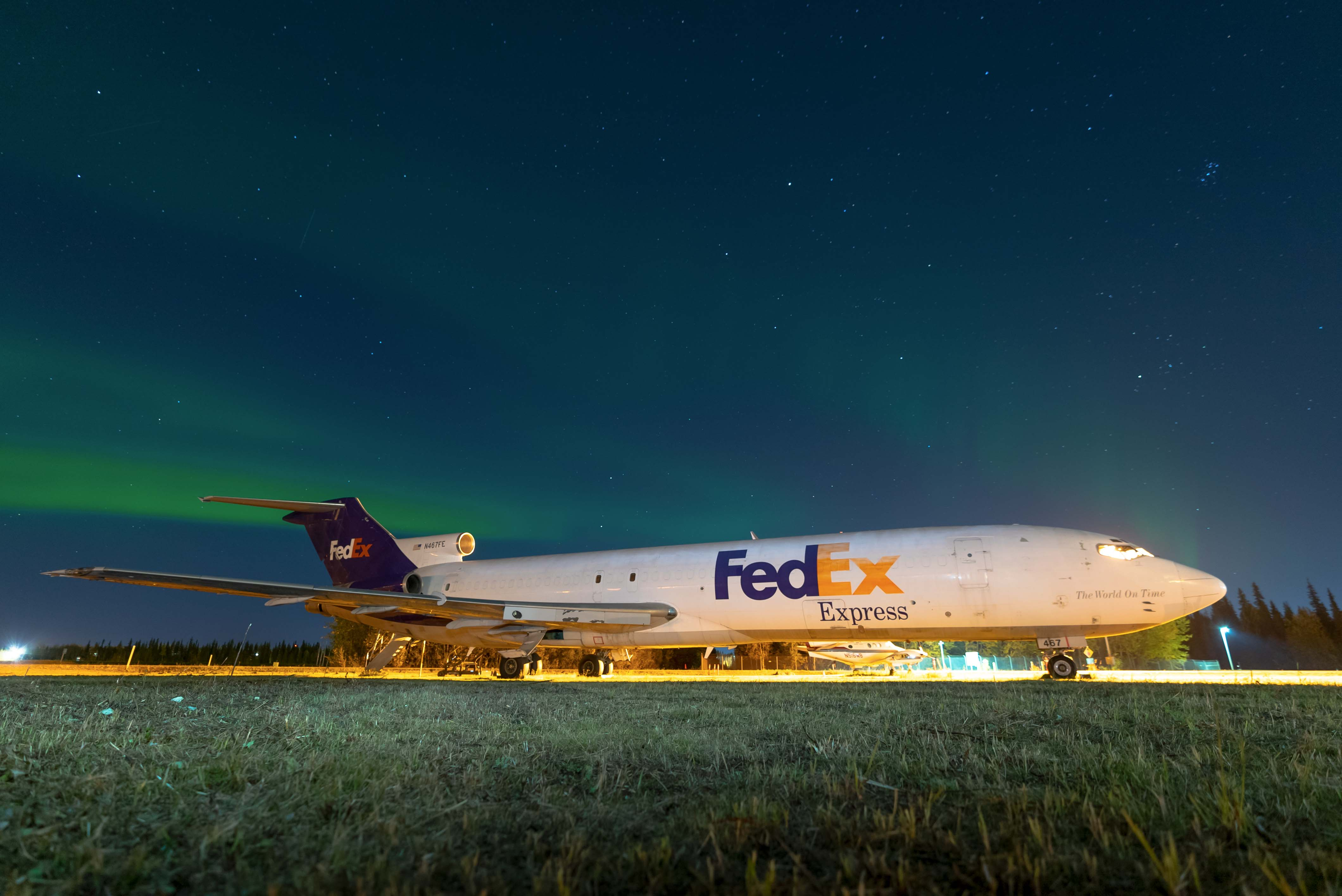
A FedEx Boeing 727 donated to the University of Alaska Fairbanks

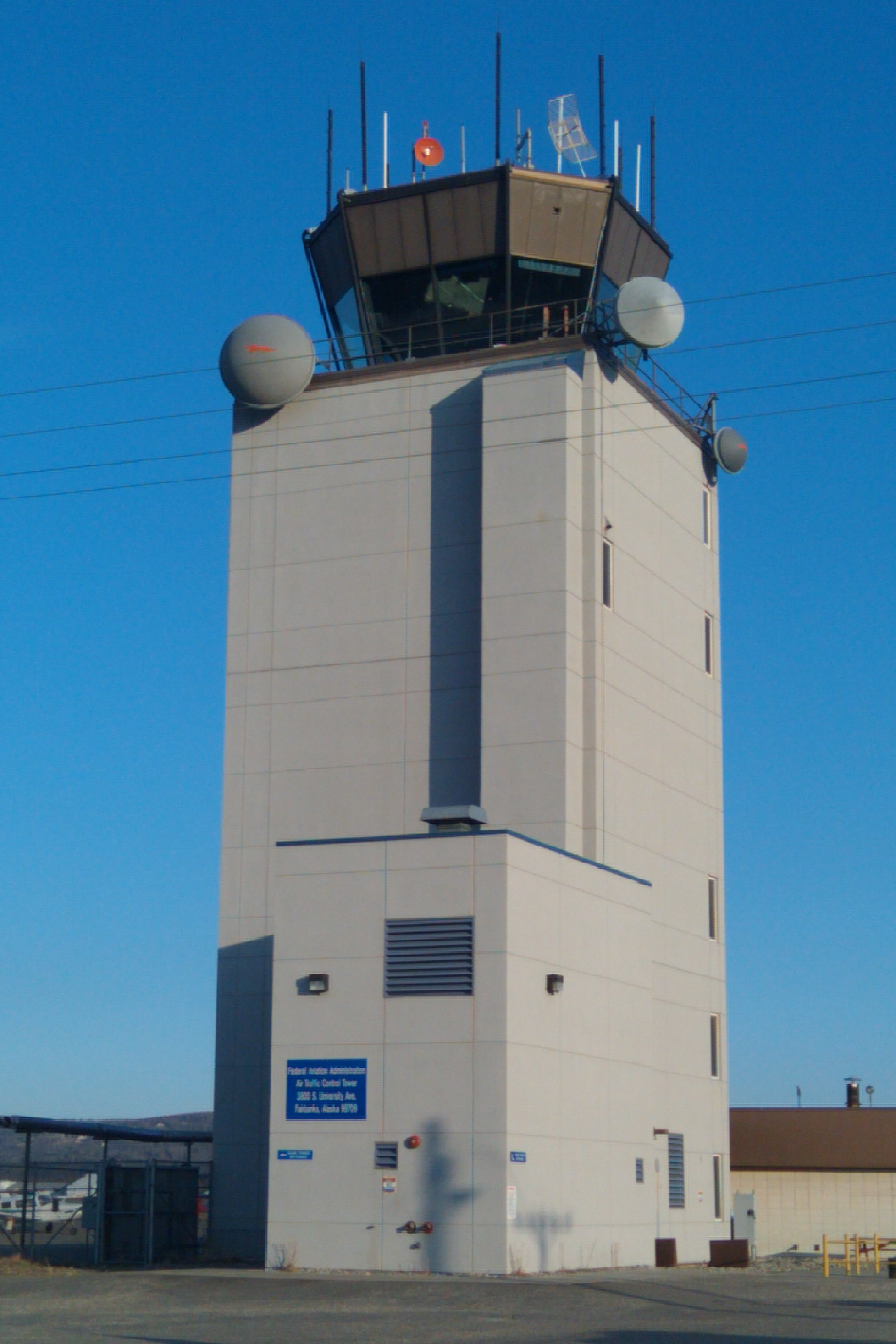
The airport's control tower, located on the East Ramp

Top domestic destinations (December 2024 - November 2025)
Rank	City	Passengers	Carriers
1	Seattle/Tacoma, WA	287,130	Alaska, Delta
2	Anchorage, AK	173,950	Alaska
3	Chicago, IL	16,010	United
4	Minneapolis/St. Paul, MN	13,840	Delta
5	Denver, CO	12,390	United
6	Galena, AK	8,500	Everts, Wright
7	Salt Lake City	8,460	Delta
8	Portland (OR)	5,950	Delta
9	Fort Yukon, AK	5,000	Everts, Wright
10	Anaktuvuk Pass, AK	2,950	Everts, Wright

=== Airline market share ===
Top airlines at FAI (December 2024 - November 2025)
Rank	Airline	Passengers	Percent of market share
1	Alaska Airlines	624,000	56.09%
2	Horizon Air	221,000	19.89%
3	Delta Air Lines	135,000	12.14%
4	United Airlines	60,980	5.48%
5	Wright Air Service	46,210	4.15%
6	Other Airlines	24,940	2.24%

== Accidents and incidents ==
- On December 30, 1951, Transocean Air Lines Flight 501, a Curtiss C-46 Commando and a cargo flight, crashed on approach to FAI due to not following radio procedures and spatial disorientation. All four occupants were killed. The wreckage was found on January 3, 1952.
- On February 16, 1975, a Pacific Alaska Airlines DC-6, a cargo flight, crashed attempting to return to Fairbanks Int'l Airport. Three engines lost power after takeoff from runway 10 and crashed 2 km short of runway 19 attempting to return to the airport possibly due to fuel contamination. All three occupants were killed.
- On February 28, 1994, during takeoff for a ferry flight to Miami, a Lockheed L-1011-1 Tristar of Rich International Airways (registered N303EA) experienced a mechanical power loss on the number 3 and number 1 engines and an internal fire on the number 1 engine. The takeoff was aborted, and during the taxi back, the fire on the number 1 engine was extinguished. None of the 3 occupants on board were injured.
- On April 23, 2024, approximately six minutes after takeoff, an Alaska Air Fuel Douglas C-54D, (registered N3054V), suffered an engine explosion and crashed along the Tanana River 7 mi (11 km) southwest of Fairbanks. Two occupants were onboard the plane, and both were killed.
