= Rampart Airport =

Airport in Alaska, United States

- IATA: RMP; ICAO: PFMP; FAA LID: RMP

Summary
- Airport type: Public
- Owner: Alaska DOT&PF - Northern Region
- Serves: Rampart, Alaska
- Elevation AMSL: 307 ft (94 m)
- Coordinates: 65°30′28″N 150°08′27″W

Map
- Location of airport in Alaska

Runways
Direction	Length		Surface
Direction	ft	m	Surface
11/29	3,520	1,073	Gravel

Statistics (2005)
- Aircraft operations: 350
- Source: Federal Aviation Administration

Rampart Airport (IATA: RMP, ICAO: PFMP, FAA LID: RMP) is a state owned, public use airport located one nautical mile (2 km) east of the central business district of Rampart, in the Yukon-Koyukuk Census Area of the U.S. state of Alaska. Commercial service was subsidized by the Essential Air Service program until October 2016.

As per Federal Aviation Administration records, the airport had 224 passenger boardings (enplanements) in calendar year 2008, 159 enplanements in 2009, and 224 in 2010. It is included in the National Plan of Integrated Airport Systems for 2011–2015, which categorized it as a general aviation airport.

== Facilities and aircraft ==
Rampart Airport has one runway designated 11/29 with a gravel surface measuring 3,520 by 75 feet (1,073 x 23 m). For the 12-month period ending December 31, 2005, the airport had 350 aircraft operations, an average of 29 per month: 71% air taxi and 29% general aviation.

== Airlines and destinations ==
Airlines	Destinations
Warbelow's Air Ventures	Fairbanks

== See also ==
- List of airports in Alaska

== Other sources ==
- Essential Air Service documents (Docket OST-2008-0201) from the U.S. Department of Transportation:
  - 90-Day Notice (June 26, 2008): from Warbelow's Air Ventures, Inc. of its intent to terminate essential air service ("EAS") between Fairbanks and Rampart, Alaska (unable to operate this service economically without a subsidy).
  - Order 2008-7-7 (July 3, 2008): the department is prohibiting Warbelow's Air Ventures, Inc., from suspending service at Rampart, Alaska, and requesting proposals by July 31 from carriers interested in providing replacement essential air service.
  - Order 2008-9-20 (September 16, 2008): selecting Warbelow's Air Ventures, Inc., to provide subsidized essential air service at Rampart, Alaska, for the two-year period from September 24, 2008, through September 30, 2010, at an annual rate of $86,701.
  - Order 2010-7-10 (July 15, 2010): re-selecting Warbelow's Air Ventures, Inc., to provide essential air service (EAS) at Rampart, Alaska, at an annual subsidy rate of $97,679 from October 1, 2010, through September 30, 2012.
  - Order 2012-10-14 (October 11, 2012): re-selecting Warbelow's Air Ventures, Inc., to provide Essential Air Service (EAS) at Rampart, Alaska, for $76,416 annually for two nonstop round trips per week to Fairbanks with Piper Navajo equipment through October 31, 2014.
