= Barter Island =

Island in Alaska, United States

Coordinates: 70°07′05″N 143°40′00″W

Barter Island is an island located on the Arctic coast of the U.S. state of Alaska, east of Arey Island in the Beaufort Sea. It is about four miles (6 km) long and about two miles (3 km) wide at it's widest point.

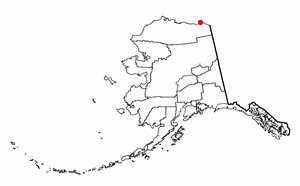
Location of Kaktovik, Alaska

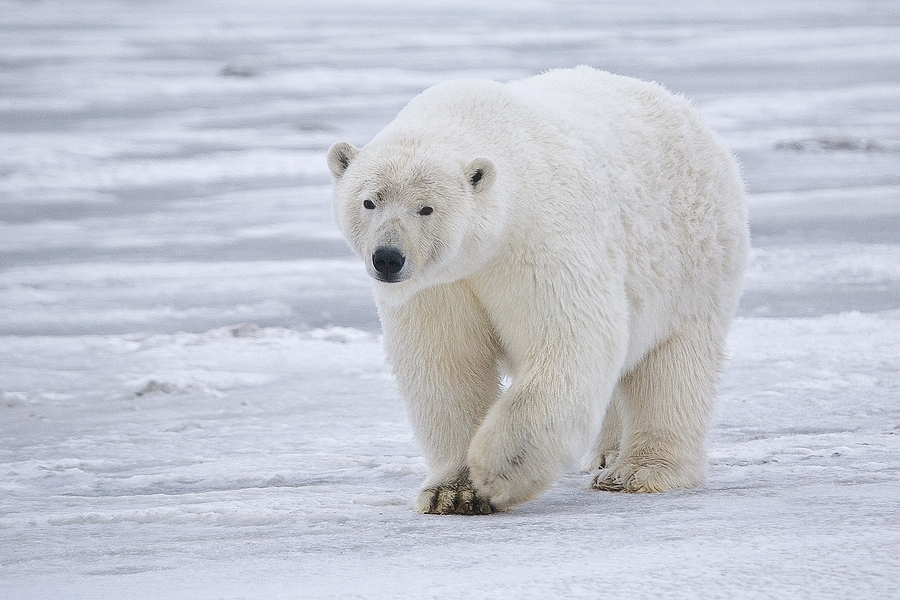
A polar bear near Kaktovik

Until the late 19th century, Barter Island was a major trade center for the Inupiat people and was especially important as a bartering place for Inupiat from Alaska and Inuit from Canada, hence its name.

At one time before about 1900, there had been a large whaling village on Barter Island. Tradition has it that the Alaska Inupiat drove the villagers, Canadian Inupiat, from the island in about 1900.

In about 1919, trader Tom Gordon and his wife, Mary Agiaq Gordon, moved from Barrow to Barter Island with their family, some relatives, friends, and their families. Mary's younger brother, Andrew Akootchook, helped to choose the location for the trading post, because of its good harbor and convenient and accessible location for hunting on land and sea. Tom Gordon and the settlers built a trading post at the site and a few families settled near Gordon's trading post.

== DEW Line (Distant Early Warning) ==
Starting in March 1953, a runway and Distant Early Warning Line radar station were built on the island by Western Electric Company, augmented by U.S. Navy sealift and U.S. Air Force Douglas C-124 Globemaster II heavy-lift aircraft. This would be the operational test & evaluation (prototype) installation proving site for the DEW Line facilities that were to later fan out across Alaska, Canada, Greenland, and Iceland. The site was completed in November 1953 to meet requirements for testing in 1954, during which the Air Force conducted evaluation studies. In September 1954, Western Electric was contracted to complete the rest of the DEW Line.

== Modern history ==
Time-lapse video from USGS of bluff erosion on Barter Island, Alaska

Several families settled near the runway and the area around the runway was incorporated in 1971 as the City of Kaktovik.

In 1970 3 sounding rockets of Nike-Tomahawk type were launched there for high-altitude research.

== Climate ==
Barter Island has a tundra climate (Köppen: ETf), with long winters and warm but short summer days.

Climate data for Barter Island WSO airport (1961–1990 normals, extremes 1947–present)
Month	Jan	Feb	Mar	Apr	May	Jun	Jul	Aug	Sep	Oct	Nov	Dec	Year
Record high °F (°C)	39 (4)	37 (3)	36 (2)	43 (6)	52 (11)	68 (20)	78 (26)	72 (22)	66 (19)	49 (9)	41 (5)	37 (3)	78 (26)
Mean maximum °F (°C)	19.7 (−6.8)	13.2 (−10.4)	14.0 (−10.0)	27.3 (−2.6)	40.6 (4.8)	54.6 (12.6)	63.6 (17.6)	60.0 (15.6)	50.0 (10.0)	34.1 (1.2)	23.9 (−4.5)	22.4 (−5.3)	65.5 (18.6)
Mean daily maximum °F (°C)	−7.4 (−21.9)	−12.9 (−24.9)	−8.7 (−22.6)	6.3 (−14.3)	25.9 (−3.4)	38.5 (3.6)	44.8 (7.1)	43.3 (6.3)	35.0 (1.7)	19.5 (−6.9)	4.1 (−15.5)	−4.7 (−20.4)	15.4 (−9.2)
Daily mean °F (°C)	−12.5 (−24.7)	−19.7 (−28.7)	−16.1 (−26.7)	−2.0 (−18.9)	20.9 (−6.2)	34.5 (1.4)	40.0 (4.4)	38.8 (3.8)	31.5 (−0.3)	14.3 (−9.8)	−1.6 (−18.7)	−11.6 (−24.2)	9.7 (−12.4)
Mean daily minimum °F (°C)	−19.8 (−28.8)	−25.3 (−31.8)	−22.4 (−30.2)	−9.2 (−22.9)	14.9 (−9.5)	30.0 (−1.1)	34.4 (1.3)	33.8 (1.0)	27.2 (−2.7)	9.5 (−12.5)	−7.2 (−21.8)	−17.5 (−27.5)	4.1 (−15.5)
Mean minimum °F (°C)	−39.3 (−39.6)	−45.3 (−42.9)	−40.6 (−40.3)	−30.7 (−34.8)	−1.6 (−18.7)	23.6 (−4.7)	28.8 (−1.8)	27.3 (−2.6)	16.3 (−8.7)	−11.1 (−23.9)	−27.9 (−33.3)	−38.3 (−39.1)	−48.5 (−44.7)
Record low °F (°C)	−54 (−48)	−59 (−51)	−51 (−46)	−44 (−42)	−16 (−27)	9 (−13)	24 (−4)	20 (−7)	4 (−16)	−26 (−32)	−51 (−46)	−51 (−46)	−59 (−51)
Average precipitation inches (mm)	0.37 (9.4)	0.20 (5.1)	0.23 (5.8)	0.19 (4.8)	0.28 (7.1)	0.43 (11)	0.95 (24)	1.03 (26)	0.69 (18)	0.62 (16)	0.38 (9.7)	0.26 (6.6)	5.62 (143)
Average snowfall inches (cm)	4.2 (11)	2.2 (5.6)	2.7 (6.9)	2.4 (6.1)	2.8 (7.1)	1.6 (4.1)	0.5 (1.3)	1.6 (4.1)	4.6 (12)	8.8 (22)	5.1 (13)	3.5 (8.9)	40.0 (102)
Average precipitation days (≥ 0.01 inch)	4.6	4.3	4.4	4.9	5.4	5.3	8.0	11.8	9.7	11.8	7.1	5.3	82.6
Average snowy days (≥ 0.1 inch)	4.7	4.7	4.8	5.5	5.6	2.2	0.6	2.3	6.0	11.8	7.2	5.8	61.2
Source 1: WRCC
Source 2: XMACIS (snowfall)

== Demographics ==
See Kaktovik.
