= Minto Al Wright Airport =

Airport in Alaska, United States

- IATA: MNT; ICAO: PAAF; FAA LID: 51Z

Summary
- Airport type: Public
- Owner: State of Alaska DOT&PF - Northern Region
- Serves: Minto, Alaska
- Elevation AMSL: 500 ft (150 m)
- Coordinates: 65°08′53″N 149°22′07″W

Map
- Location of airport in Alaska

Runways
Direction	Length		Surface
Direction	ft	m	Surface
2/20	3,400	1,036	Gravel

Statistics (2005)
- Aircraft operations: 1,000
- Source: Federal Aviation Administration

Minto Al Wright Airport (IATA: MNT, ICAO: PAAF, FAA LID: 51Z) is a state-owned public-use airport located one nautical mile (2 km) east of the central business district of Minto, in the Yukon-Koyukuk Census Area of the U.S. state of Alaska. Formerly known as Minto Airport, it was renamed in August 2009 to honor Al Wright, an Alaskan aviation pioneer and founder of Wright Air Service. Scheduled commercial airline service is subsidized by the Essential Air Service program.

As per Federal Aviation Administration records, the airport had 154 passenger boardings (enplanements) in calendar year 2008, 193 enplanements in 2009, and 294 in 2010. It is included in the National Plan of Integrated Airport Systems for 2011–2015, which categorized it as a general aviation airport (the commercial service category requires at least 2,500 enplanements per year).

== Facilities and aircraft ==
Minto Al Wright Airport covers an area of 295 acres (119 ha) at an elevation of 495 feet (151 m) above mean sea level. It has one runway designated 2/20 with a gravel surface measuring 3,400 by 75 feet (1,036 x 23 m). For the 12-month period ending December 31, 2005, the airport had 1,000 aircraft operations, an average of 83 per month: 50% air taxi and 50% general aviation.

== Airlines and destinations ==
Airlines	Destinations
Warbelow's Air Ventures	Fairbanks, Manley Hot Springs

== See also ==
- List of airports in Alaska

== Other sources ==
- Essential Air Service documents (Docket OST-2004-17563) from the U.S. Department of Transportation:
  - 90-Day Notice (April 9, 2004): of Bidzy Ta Hot Aana Corp. d/b/a Tanana Air Service of intent to terminate unsubsidized service at Minto and Manley, Alaska.
  - Order 2004-4-23 (April 30, 2004): allowing Tanana Air Service to terminate all scheduled air service at Minto and Manley Hot Springs, Alaska, and granting the carriers request to terminate such service on less than 90 days notice. Tanana Air Services termination is contingent, however, upon the commencement of suitable replacement service operated by Warbelows Air Ventures.
  - 90-Day Notice (May 12, 2004) of Warbelows Air Ventures, Inc. of intent to terminate unsubsidized service at Minto and Manley, Alaska
  - Order 2004-6-26 (June 28. 2004): requires Warbelow's Air Ventures to continue providing essential air service at Minto and Manley Hot Springs, Alaska, for an initial 30-day period; and requests proposals for replacement essential air service at the communities for a two-year period.
  - Order 2004-9-6 (September 7, 2004): selects Warbelow's Air Ventures to continue providing essential air service at Minto and Manley Hot Springs for a two-year period, and establishes a subsidy rate of $49,536 per year for service consisting of three flights per week over a Fairbanks-Manley-Minto-Fairbanks routing with 3-seat Cessna 206/207 aircraft.
  - Order 2006-7-4 (July 5, 2006): re-selecting Warbelow's Air Ventures, Inc., to provide subsidized essential air service (EAS) at Minto and Manley Hot Springs, Alaska, at an annual subsidy rate of $65,808 for the period of September 1, 2006, through August 31, 2008.
  - Order 2008-7-20 (July 15, 2008): selects Warbelow's Air Ventures, Inc. to continue providing essential air service at Manley Hot Springs and Minto, Alaska, for a new two-year period, through August 31, 2010, and established an annual subsidy rate of $84,170.
  - Order 2010-7-6 (July 13, 2010): selecting Warbelow's Air Ventures, Inc., to continue providing essential air service (EAS) at Manley Hot Springs and Minto, Alaska, and establishing an annual subsidy rate of $95,481, for a new two-year period, through September 30, 2012.
  - Order 2012-8-10 (August 3, 2012): re-selecting Warbelows Air Ventures, Inc., to provide Essential Air Service (EAS) at Manley and Minto, Alaska, for $91,068 annually for three round trips per week to Fairbanks. Aircraft Types: PA-31-350 Navajo, Cessna 206. Effective Period: September 1, 2012, through August 31, 2014.
