= Minchumina Airport =

Minchumina Airport Lake Minchumina Airport
- IATA: LMA; ICAO: PAMH; FAA LID: MHM

Summary
- Airport type: Public
- Owner: State of Alaska DOT&PF
- Serves: Lake Minchumina, Alaska
- Elevation AMSL: 682 ft / 208 m
- Coordinates: 63°53′10″N 152°18′07″W

Map
- Location of airport in Alaska

Runways
Direction	Length		Surface
Direction	ft	m	Surface
3/21	4,184	1,275	Gravel

Statistics (2009)
- Aircraft operations: 1,140
- Based aircraft: 2
- Source: Federal Aviation Administration

Minchumina Airport (IATA: LMA, ICAO: PAMH, FAA LID: MHM) is a state-owned public-use airport serving Lake Minchumina, in the Yukon-Koyukuk Census Area of the U.S. state of Alaska. It is also known as Lake Minchumina Airport. In the past, the airport used MHM IATA code.

Scheduled passenger service at this airport is subsidized by the United States Department of Transportation via the Essential Air Service program.

== Facilities and aircraft ==
Minchumina Airport covers an area of 674 acres (273 ha) at an elevation of 678 feet (207 m) above mean sea level. It has one runway designated 3/21 with a gravel surface measuring 4,200 by 100 feet (1,280 x 30 m). For the 12-month period ending December 31, 2005, the airport had 1,140 aircraft operations, an average of 95 per month: 96% general aviation and 4% air taxi. The airport's elevation is 698 feet above mean sea level.

== Airlines and destinations ==
The following airline offers scheduled passenger service:

Airlines	Destinations
Wright Air Service	Fairbanks

=== Statistics ===
Carrier shares: January – December 2013
Carrier	Passengers (arriving and departing)
Wright	220(99.55%)
Tanana	1(0.45%)

Top domestic destinations: Jan. – Dec. 2013
Rank	City	Airport name & IATA code	Passengers	
Rank	City	Airport name & IATA code	2013	2012
1	Fairbanks, Alaska	Fairbanks International (FAI)	100	90
2	McGrath, AK	McGrath Airport (MCG)	<10	<10

== Recent Developments ==
Airport Maintenance Contract: In May 2022, the State of Alaska's Department of Transportation and Public Facilities issued an invitation to bid for the routine summer and winter maintenance of Lake Minchumina Airport. The scope includes upkeep of runways, taxiways, aprons, state-owned equipment, and buildings located at the airport.

Acquisition of Snow Removal Equipment: In June 2023, the Federal Aviation Administration announced an Airport Improvement Program (AIP) grant of $389,500 to Minchumina Airport for the acquisition of snow removal equipment, aiming to enhance the airport's operational efficiency during winter months.
