= Venetie Airport =

Airport in Alaska, United States

- IATA: VEE; ICAO: PAVE; FAA LID: VEE

Summary
- Airport type: Public
- Owner: Venetie Tribal Government
- Serves: Venetie, Alaska
- Elevation AMSL: 574 ft (175 m)
- Coordinates: 67°00′31″N 146°21′59″W

Map
- Location of airport in Alaska

Runways
Direction	Length		Surface
Direction	ft	m	Surface
4/22	4,000	1,219	Gravel

Statistics (2005)
- Aircraft operations: 1,900
- Source: Federal Aviation Administration

Venetie Airport (IATA: VEE, ICAO: PAVE, FAA LID: VEE) is a public use airport located in Venetie, in the Yukon-Koyukuk Census Area of the U.S. state of Alaska. It is privately owned by the Venetie Tribal Government.

According to Federal Aviation Administration records, the airport had 1,993 passenger boardings (enplanements) in the calendar year 2008, 2,120 enplanements in 2009 and 2,523 in 2010. It was included in the National Plan of Integrated Airport Systems for 2011–2015, which categorized it as a "general aviation" airport based on enplanements in 2008/2009 (the "commercial service" category requires at least 2,500 per year).

== Facilities and aircraft ==
Venetie Airport has one runway designated 4/22 with a gravel surface measuring 4,000 by 75 feet (1,219 x 23 m).

For the 12-month period ending December 31, 2005, the airport had 1,900 aircraft operations, an average of 158 per month: 79% air taxi and 21% general aviation.

== Airlines and destinations ==
The following airlines offer scheduled passenger service at this airport:

Airlines	Destinations
Everts Air	Fairbanks
Wright Air Service	Arctic Village, Fairbanks, Fort Yukon

=== Top destinations ===
Busiest domestic routes out of VEE (July 2010 - June 2011)
Rank	City	Passengers	Carriers
1	(Alaska) Fairbanks, AK	2,000	Arctic Circle, Wright
2	(Alaska) Fort Yukon, AK	1,000	Wright

== See also ==
- List of airports in Alaska
