= Chalkyitsik, Alaska =

Chalkyitsik Jałgiitsik
- CDP
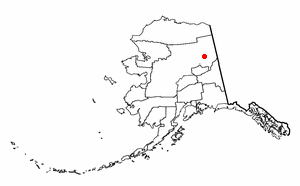
- Location of Chalkyitsik, Alaska
- Coordinates: 66°39′6″N 143°43′38″W
- Country: United States
- State: Alaska
- Census Area: Yukon-Koyukuk

Government
  - State senator: Click Bishop (R)
  - State rep.: Mike Cronk (R)

Area
  - Total: 8.76 sq mi (22.69 km^{2})
  - Land: 8.50 sq mi (22.02 km^{2})
  - Water: 0.26 sq mi (0.67 km^{2})

Population (2020)
  - Total: 56
  - Density: 6.6/sq mi (2.54/km^{2})
- Time zone: UTC-9 (Alaska (AKST))
  - Summer (DST): UTC-8 (AKDT)
- ZIP code: 99788
- Area code: 907
- FIPS code: 02-11800

Chalkyitsik (/ˌtʃælkiˈɪtsɪk/ CHAL-key-IT-sick) (Jałgiitsik [tʃaɬgiːtsʰikʰ] in Gwichʼin), meaning "to fish with a hook, at the mouth of the creek", is a census-designated place (CDP) in Yukon-Koyukuk Census Area, Alaska, United States. It is located on the left (south) bank of the Black River, 45 miles northeast of Fort Yukon. As of the 2020 census, Chalkyitsik had a population of 56.

== Geography ==
Chalkyitsik is located at 66°39′6″N 143°43′38″W (66.651529, -143.727356).

According to the United States Census Bureau, the CDP has a total area of 9.1 square miles (24 km^{2}), of which, 8.7 square miles (23 km^{2}) of it is land and 0.3 square miles (0.78 km^{2}) of it (3.76%) is water. Chalkystik has a bitter subarctic climate.

=== Climate ===
Chalkyitsik has a continental subarctic climate (Köppen climate classification Dwc) with mild summers and cold winters. Precipitation is very low, but significantly higher in summer than at other times of the year. A weather station was operated from August 1962 to November 1972; the weather record is thus very sparse.

Climate data for Chalkyitsik
Month	Jan	Feb	Mar	Apr	May	Jun	Jul	Aug	Sep	Oct	Nov	Dec	Year
Record high °F (°C)	26 (−3)	35 (2)	48 (9)	62 (17)	77 (25)	94 (34)	90 (32)	84 (29)	69 (21)	52 (11)	38 (3)	26 (−3)	94 (34)
Mean daily maximum °F (°C)	−17.1 (−27.3)	−6.8 (−21.6)	18.6 (−7.4)	37.4 (3.0)	51.9 (11.1)	69.9 (21.1)	72.6 (22.6)	64.5 (18.1)	51 (11)	27.6 (−2.4)	3.4 (−15.9)	−8.7 (−22.6)	30.4 (−0.9)
Mean daily minimum °F (°C)	−35.1 (−37.3)	−28.5 (−33.6)	−10.3 (−23.5)	14.8 (−9.6)	28.1 (−2.2)	43.6 (6.4)	48.7 (9.3)	41.3 (5.2)	28.7 (−1.8)	12.4 (−10.9)	−13.8 (−25.4)	−32.2 (−35.7)	8.1 (−13.3)
Record low °F (°C)	−69 (−56)	−69 (−56)	−52 (−47)	−34 (−37)	−6 (−21)	20 (−7)	29 (−2)	21 (−6)	1 (−17)	−21 (−29)	−46 (−43)	−65 (−54)	−69 (−56)
Average precipitation inches (mm)	0.25 (6.4)	0.11 (2.8)	0.27 (6.9)	0.21 (5.3)	0.22 (5.6)	1.1 (28)	1 (25)	1.04 (26)	0.45 (11)	0.54 (14)	0.35 (8.9)	0.46 (12)	6 (151.9)
Average snowfall inches (cm)	3.6 (9.1)	2.3 (5.8)	3.6 (9.1)	1.6 (4.1)	0 (0)	0 (0)	0 (0)	0 (0)	0.1 (0.25)	6.4 (16)	6 (15)	6.1 (15)	29.7 (74.35)
Average precipitation days	5	3	3	2	3	6	7	7	5	5	5	6	57
Source: WRCC

== Education ==
Yukon Flats School District operates the Tsuk Taih School.

== Demographics ==
Historical population
Census	Pop.	Note	%±
1930	35		—
1940	33		−5.7%
1960	57		—
1970	130		128.1%
1980	100		−23.1%
1990	90		−10.0%
2000	83		−7.8%
2010	69		−16.9%
2020	56		−18.8%
U.S. Decennial Census

Chalkyitsik first appeared as an unincorporated village on the 1930 U.S. Census under the name of Fishhook, which is the literal translation of the native name, not to be confused with the present census-designated place, Fishhook in the Matanuska-Susitna Borough. It appeared again in 1940, but failed to appear in 1950. It was returned in 1960 formally as Chalkyitsik, and has appeared on every successive census. It was made a census-designated place (CDP) in 1980.

As of the census of 2000, there were 83 people, 35 households, and 17 families residing in the CDP. The population density was 9.5 inhabitants per square mile (3.7/km^{2}). There were 62 housing units at an average density of 7.1 per square mile (2.7/km^{2}). The racial makeup of the CDP was 97.59% Native American and 2.41% white.

There were 35 households, out of which 25.7% had children under the age of 18 living with them, 28.6% were married couples living together, 2.9% had a female householder with no husband present, and 51.4% were non-families. 37.1% of all households were made up of individuals, and 14.3% had someone living alone who was 65 years of age or older. The average household size was 2.37 and the average family size was 3.29.

In the CDP, the population was spread out, with 27.7% under the age of 18, 13.3% from 18 to 24, 28.9% from 25 to 44, 14.5% from 45 to 64, and 15.7% who were 65 years of age or older. The median age was 33 years. For every 100 females, there were 137.1 males. For every 100 females age 18 and over, there were 185.7 males.

The median income for a household in the CDP was $16,250, and the median income for a family was $16,875. Males had a median income of $41,250 versus $13,750 for females. The per capita income for the CDP was $11,509. There were 54.5% of families and 52.6% of the population living below the poverty line, including 100.0% of under eighteen and none of those over 64.

== Transportation ==
The city is served by Chalkyitsik Airport with one commercial airline. With only 69 residents, Chalkytsik has one of the lowest per-airline averages of residents in the United States.
