= Birch Creek, Alaska =

Birch Creek Łiteetʼaii
- CDP
- Location within the state of Alaska
- Coordinates: 66°15′24″N 145°48′55″W
- Country: United States
- State: Alaska
- Census Area: Yukon-Koyukuk

Government
  - State senator: Mike Cronk (R)
  - State rep.: Rebecca Schwanke (R)

Area
  - Total: 8.28 sq mi (21.45 km^{2})
  - Land: 8.07 sq mi (20.90 km^{2})
  - Water: 0.21 sq mi (0.55 km^{2})

Population (2020)
  - Total: 35
  - Density: 4.3/sq mi (1.67/km^{2})
- Time zone: UTC-9 (Alaska (AKST))
  - Summer (DST): UTC-8 (AKDT)
- ZIP code: 99740
- Area code: 907
- FIPS code: 02-07620

Birch Creek (Łiteet'aii in Gwich’in) is a census-designated place (CDP) in Yukon-Koyukuk Census Area, Alaska, United States. As of the 2020 census, Birch Creek had a population of 35.

== Geography ==
The village is along Birch Creek, about 26 miles (42 km) southwest of Fort Yukon. Birch Creek is at 66°15′24″N 145°48′55″W (66.256708, -145.815319).

According to the United States Census Bureau, the CDP has a total area of 6.4 square miles (17 km^{2}), of which, 6.1 square miles (16 km^{2}) of it is land and 0.3 square miles (0.78 km^{2}) of it (4.23%) is water.

== Demographics ==
Historical population
| Census | Pop. | Note | %± |
|---|---|---|---|
| 1940 | 32 | | — |
| 1980 | 32 | | — |
| 1990 | 42 | | 31.3% |
| 2000 | 28 | | −33.3% |
| 2010 | 33 | | 17.9% |
| 2020 | 35 | | 6.1% |
U.S. Decennial Census

Birch Creek first appeared on the 1940 U.S. Census as an unincorporated (native) village. It did not appear again until the 1980 U.S. Census when it was made a census-designated place (CDP).

As of the census of 2020, there were 35 people, 11 households, and 7 families residing in the CDP. The population density was 4.6 inhabitants per square mile (1.8/km^{2}). There were 22 housing units at an average density of 3.6 per square mile (1.4/km^{2}). The racial makeup of the CDP was 88.57% Native American, 8.57% white, and 2.86% mixed.

There were 11 households, out of which 54.5% had children under the age of 18 living with them, 9.1% were married couples living together, 45.5% had a female householder with no husband present, and 27.3% were non-families. 27.3% of all households were made up of individuals, and none were individuals aged 65 or older living alone. The average household size was 2.55 and the average family size was 2.63.

In the CDP, the population was spread out, with 28.6% under the age of 18, 14.3% from 18 to 24, 28.6% from 25 to 44, 28.6% from 45 to 64. The median age was 34 years. For every 100 females, there were approximately 115 males. For every 100 females age 18 and over, there were 100 males.

The median income for a household in the CDP was $11,250, and the median income for a family was $13,750. Males had a median income of $11,250 versus $0 for females. The per capita income for the CDP was $5,952. There were 33.3% of families and 37.0% of the population living below the poverty line, including 33.3% of under eighteens and none of those over 64.

== Education ==
It was previously served by a school of the Yukon Flats School District.

== Health ==
Sale, importation and possession of alcohol are banned in the village.
