= -zilla =

English language suffix

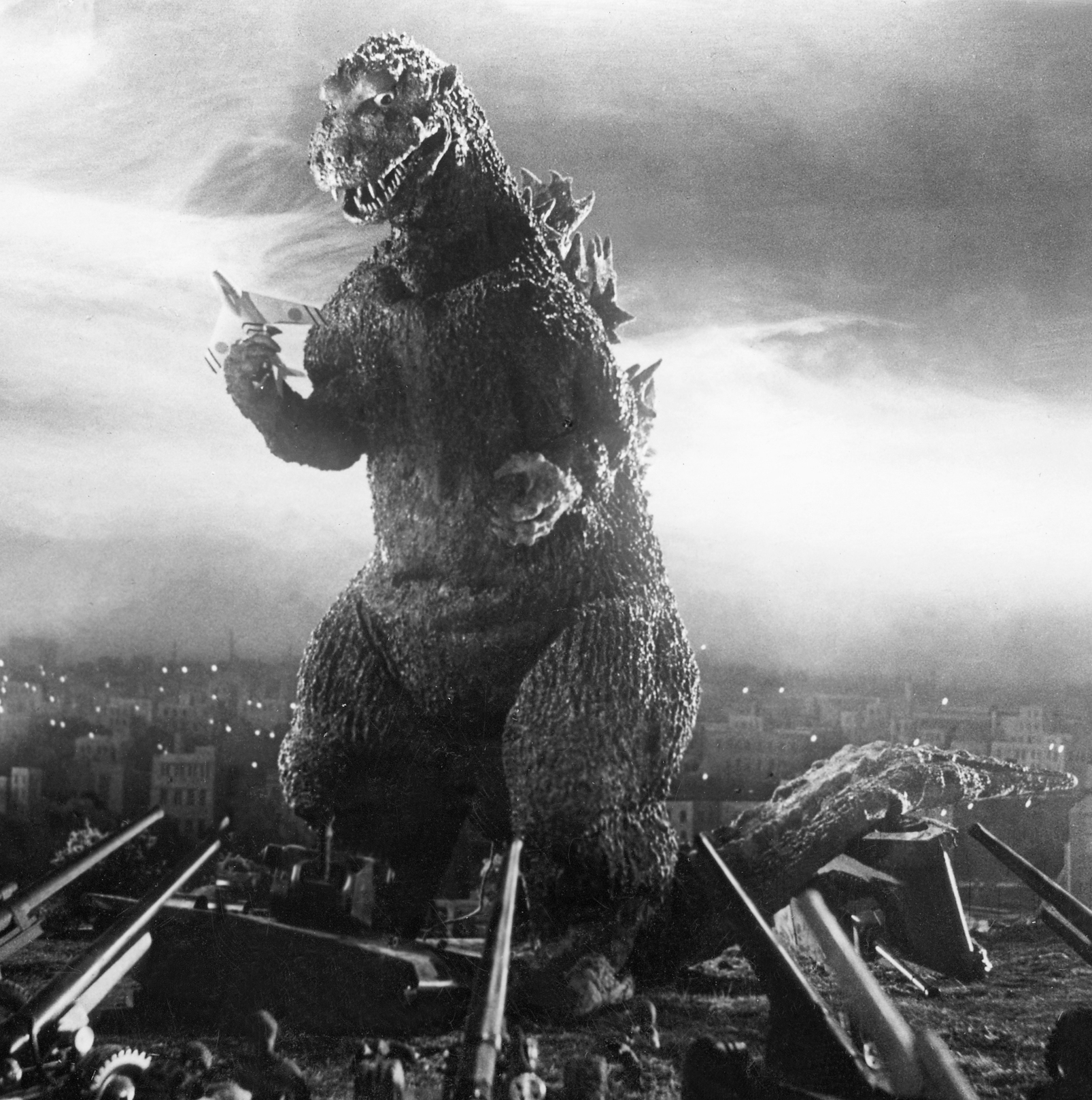
The "-zilla" suffix is derived from the name of Godzilla

-zilla is an English slang suffix, a libfix back-formation derived from the English language name of the Japanese movie monster Godzilla. It is popular for the names of software and websites. It is also found often in popular culture to imply some form of excess, denoting the monster-like qualities of Godzilla.

This trend has been observed since the popularization of the Mozilla Project, which itself included the Internet Relay Chat client ChatZilla.

The use of the suffix was contested by Toho, owners of the trademark Godzilla, in a lawsuit against the website Davezilla and also against Sears for their mark Bagzilla. Toho has since trademarked the word "Zilla" and retroactively used it as an official name for the "Godzilla In Name Only" creature from the 1998 film.

== List of items ending in -zilla ==
Some uses of the suffix -zilla include:

=== Businesses and products ===
- AmiZilla, an Amiga port of Mozilla Firefox
- Chipzilla, a humorous epithet for the Intel Corporation
- Clonezilla, an open source disk cloning software
- FileZilla, an FTP program
- Go!Zilla, a download manager program
- Hubzilla, an open source social network, part of Fediverse
- Mozilla, a group of Internet-related programs created by the Mozilla Foundation, also name of the group's widely known web browser
  - Bugzilla, open source bug tracking software, with a web-based interface
  - ChatZilla, an Internet Relay Chat program
  - Mozilla Application Suite
    - Classilla, a rebranded Mozilla Application Suite, an internet suite for the classic Mac OS
    - Ghostzilla, a web browser
    - GNUzilla, GNU's fork of the Mozilla Application Suite
    - Warpzilla, the Mozilla Application suite for OS/2
- Newszilla, the Usenet server of the Dutch internet provider XS4ALL
- Podzilla, an open source user interface for the IPodLinux project, which allows for alternative functionality of Apple Computer's iPod
- Quizilla, an online personality quiz website, which contains its own "Zillapedia"
- RevZilla.com, an online motorcycle gear retailer
- Shopzilla, a comparison-shopping search engine, formerly BizRate.com
- Godzilla (Nissan GT-R), a grand touring/ sports vehicle produced by Nissan
- Zilla Sake, a Japanese restaurant in Portland, Oregon

=== Entertainment ===
- Bongzilla, a rock band from Madison, Wisconsin
- "Bootzilla", a song recorded by Bootsy's Rubber Band
- Bridezilla (band), an Australian indie rock band
  - Bridezilla (EP), a recording by the band Bridezilla
- Bridezillas, a reality show which airs on the WE: Women's Entertainment network
- Broadzilla, a rock band from Detroit, Michigan
- Davezilla, a humor website
- Godzilla, the franchise from which the -zilla suffix originates
  - Godzilla (1954 film), the first film in the franchise
  - Zilla, a fictional character originally known as Godzilla, from the 1998 American Godzilla film
- Illzilla, an Australian hip hop group featuring live instruments
- Popzilla, an animated TV series in production for MTV
- Rapzilla, a Christian hip hop online magazine
- Tekzilla, a weekly video podcast on the Revision3 network
- "Throatzillaaa", a song recorded by Slayyyter

=== Miscellaneous ===
- axizilla, a heavy form of axion in an extension of the Standard Model.
- bitchzilla, a severely disagreeable or aggressive woman.
- couplezilla, a couple who, in the course of planning their wedding, display difficult, selfish, narcissistic behavior relating to the event.
- Crabzilla, an internet hoax about a giant crab
- cuntzilla, a term of abuse for a severely disagreeable or aggressive woman.
- Fedzilla, the federal government regarded as a rapacious monster with an appetite for political power, money, etc.
- groomzilla, a demanding and perfectionist groom (man who is to be married).
- Hogzilla, a large male wild hog hybrid that was shot and killed in 2004 in Georgia, United States.
- momzilla, a controlling or over-involved mother.
- Pigzilla, another large feral pig or possible hoax shot in 2007 in Alabama, United States.
- Squawkzilla, a nickname for a prehistoric parrot species.
- promzilla, a teenage girl who is obsessed with preparing for her prom and ensuring it turns out the way she envisions.
- Snowzilla (disambiguation)
- weddingzilla, a person overly concerned with ensuring that a wedding goes exactly as they envision it.
- wimpzilla, a theoretical superheavy dark matter particle, trillions of times more massive than other proposed types of dark matter.

=== For derived words ===
- Words ending with -zilla (List of examples in English Wiktionary)
- -zilla (explaining the suffix in English Wiktionary)
