= Hunting in the United States =

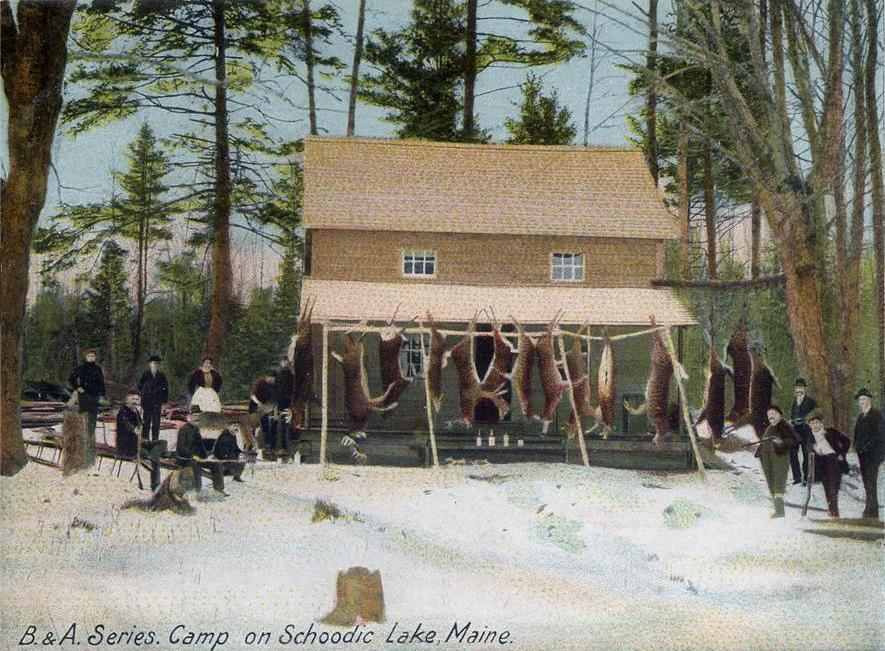
Hunting camp with dressed deer at Schoodic Lake, Maine, in 1905

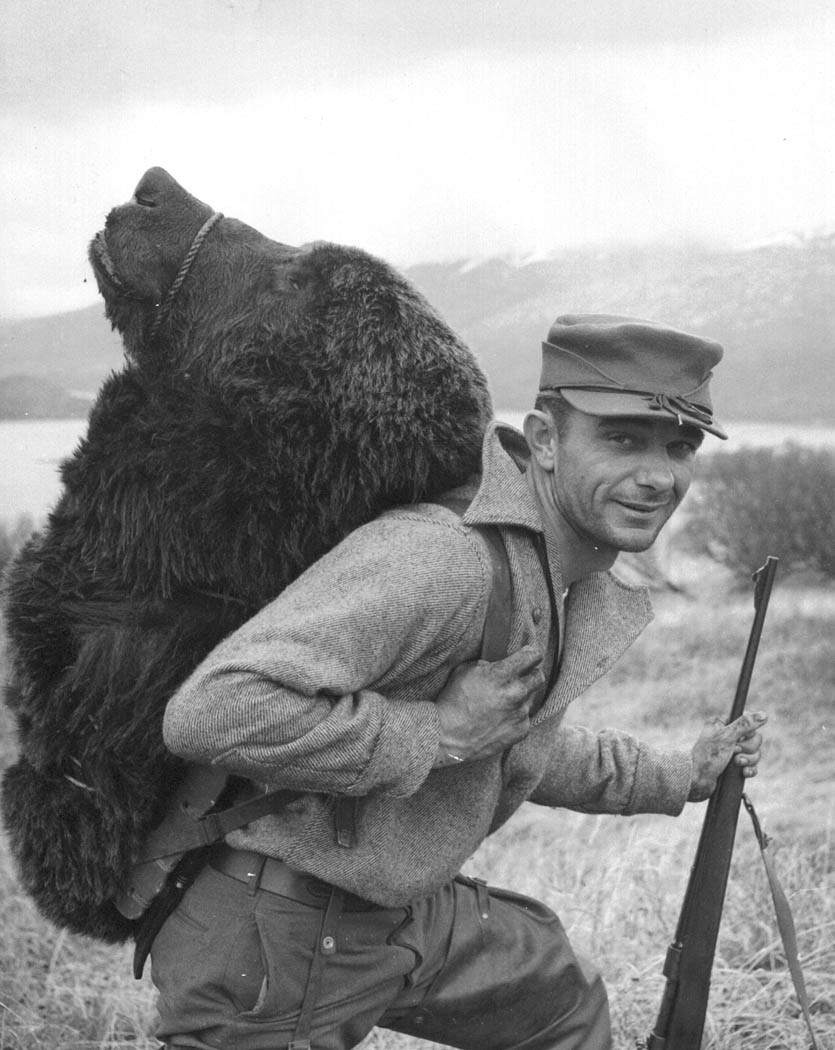
Carrying a bear trophy head at the Kodiak Archipelago

Hunting is a significant subsistence and recreational activity in the United States. Regulation of hunting began in the 19th century. Some modern hunters see themselves as conservationists. American hunting tradition values fair chase, which values the balance between the hunter and the animals. A 2006 poll showed that 78% of Americans support hunting. 6% of Americans have hunted. Hunting is most popular in the Midwest.

Nearly $200 million in hunters' federal excise taxes are distributed to support wildlife management programs, hunter education, and safety classes. Many hunting groups participate in lobbying the federal and state governments. Regulations vary widely from state to state.

== History ==
North American hunting pre-dates the United States by thousands of years and was an important part of many pre-Columbian Native American cultures.

=== Native American hunting rights ===
Native Americans retain some hunting rights and are exempt from some laws as part of Indian treaties and otherwise under federal law—examples include eagle feather laws and exemptions in the Marine Mammal Protection Act. This is considered particularly important in Alaskan native communities.

== Regulation ==
Regulation of hunting within the United States dates from the 19th century. Some modern hunters see themselves as conservationists and sportsmen in the mode of Theodore Roosevelt and the Boone and Crockett Club. Local hunting clubs and national organizations provide hunter education and help protect the future of the sport by buying land for future hunting use. Some groups represent a specific hunting interest, such as Ducks Unlimited, Pheasants Forever, or the Delta Waterfowl Foundation. Many hunting groups also participate in lobbying the federal and state governments.

Each year, nearly $200 million in hunters' federal excise taxes are distributed to state agencies to support wildlife management programs, the purchase of lands open to hunters, and hunter education and safety classes. Since 1934, the sale of Federal Duck Stamps, a required purchase for migratory waterfowl hunters over sixteen years old, has raised over $700 million to help purchase more than 5,200,000 acres (8,100 sq mi; 21,000 km^{2}) of habitat for the National Wildlife Refuge System lands that support waterfowl and many other wildlife species and are often open to hunting. States also collect money from hunting licenses to assist with management of game animals, as designated by law. A key task of federal and state park rangers and game wardens is to enforce laws and regulations related to hunting, including species protection, hunting seasons, and hunting bans.

Hunting is primarily regulated by state law; additional regulations are imposed through United States environmental law in the case of migratory birds and endangered species. Regulations vary widely from state to state and govern the areas, time periods, techniques and methods by which specific game animals may be hunted. Some states make a distinction between protected species and unprotected species (often vermin or varmints for which there are no hunting regulations). Hunters of protected species require a hunting license in all states; completion of a hunting safety course is sometimes a prerequisite.

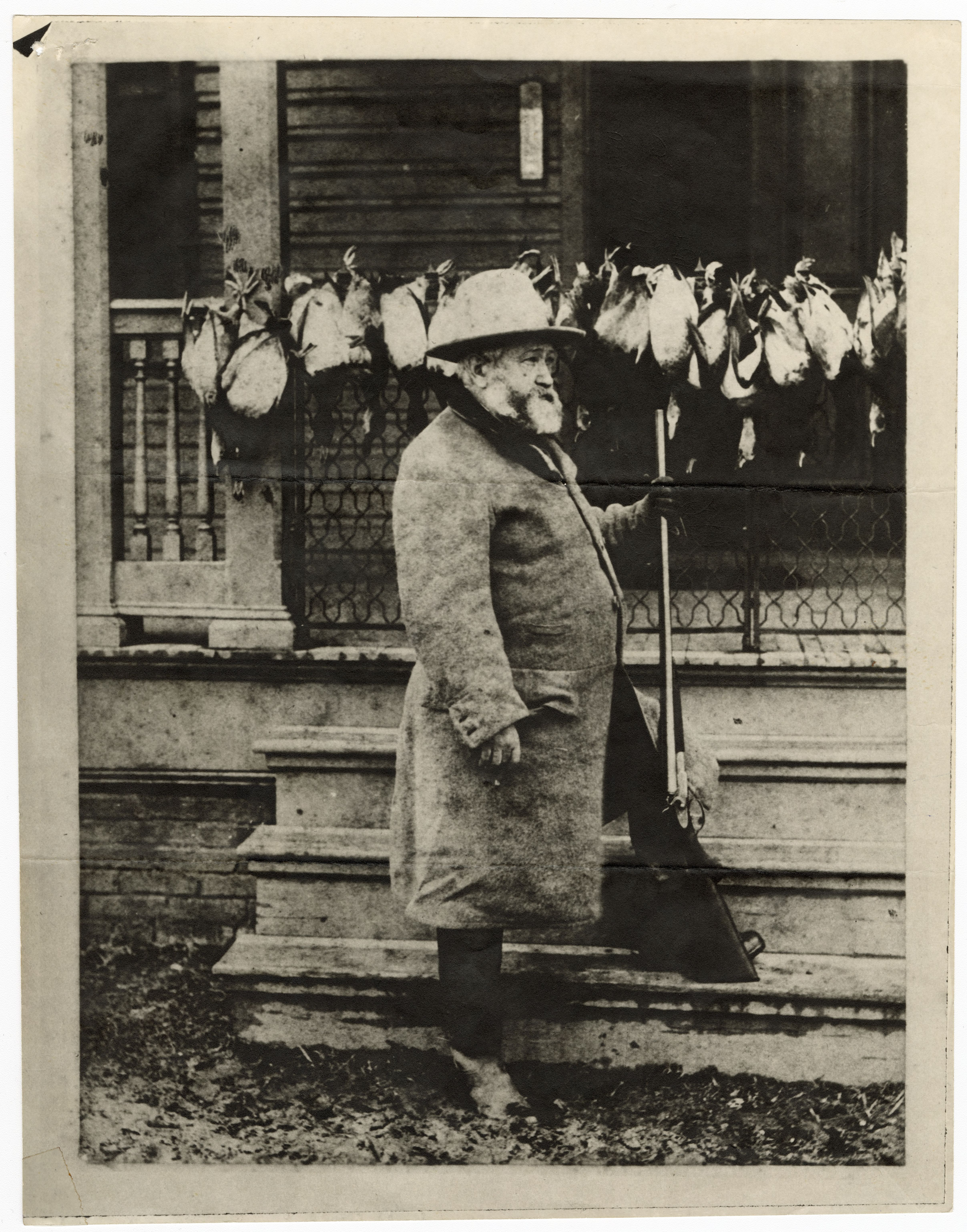
US President Benjamin Harrison with ducks he shot

Typically, game animals are divided into several categories for regulatory purposes. Typical categories, along with example species, are as follows:

- Big Game: white-tailed deer, mule deer, moose, elk, caribou, bear, bighorn sheep, mountain goat, pronghorn, pigs (both wild and feral), javelina, bison
- Non-Migratory Game Birds and Small game: grouse, partridge, pheasant, quail, rabbit, hare, tree squirrel,
- Furbearers and Predators: beaver, bobcat, cougar, coyote, mink, muskrat, opossum, otter, pine marten, raccoon, red fox, ring-tailed cat, skunk, wolf,
- Migratory Game Birds: ducks, geese, swan, woodcock, dove
- Other: armadillo, porcupine

Hunting big game typically requires a "tag" for each animal harvested. Tags must be purchased in addition to the hunting license, and the number of tags issued to an individual is typically limited. In cases where there are more prospective hunters than the quota for that species, tags are usually assigned by lottery. Tags may be further restricted to a specific area, or wildlife management unit. Hunting migratory waterfowl requires a duck stamp from the United States Fish and Wildlife Service in addition to the appropriate state hunting license.

Harvest of animals other than big game is typically restricted by a bag limit and a possession limit. A bag limit is the maximum number of a specific animal species that an individual can harvest in a single day. A possession limit is the maximum number of a specific animal species that can be in an individual's possession at any time.

== Culture ==
=== Shooting ===
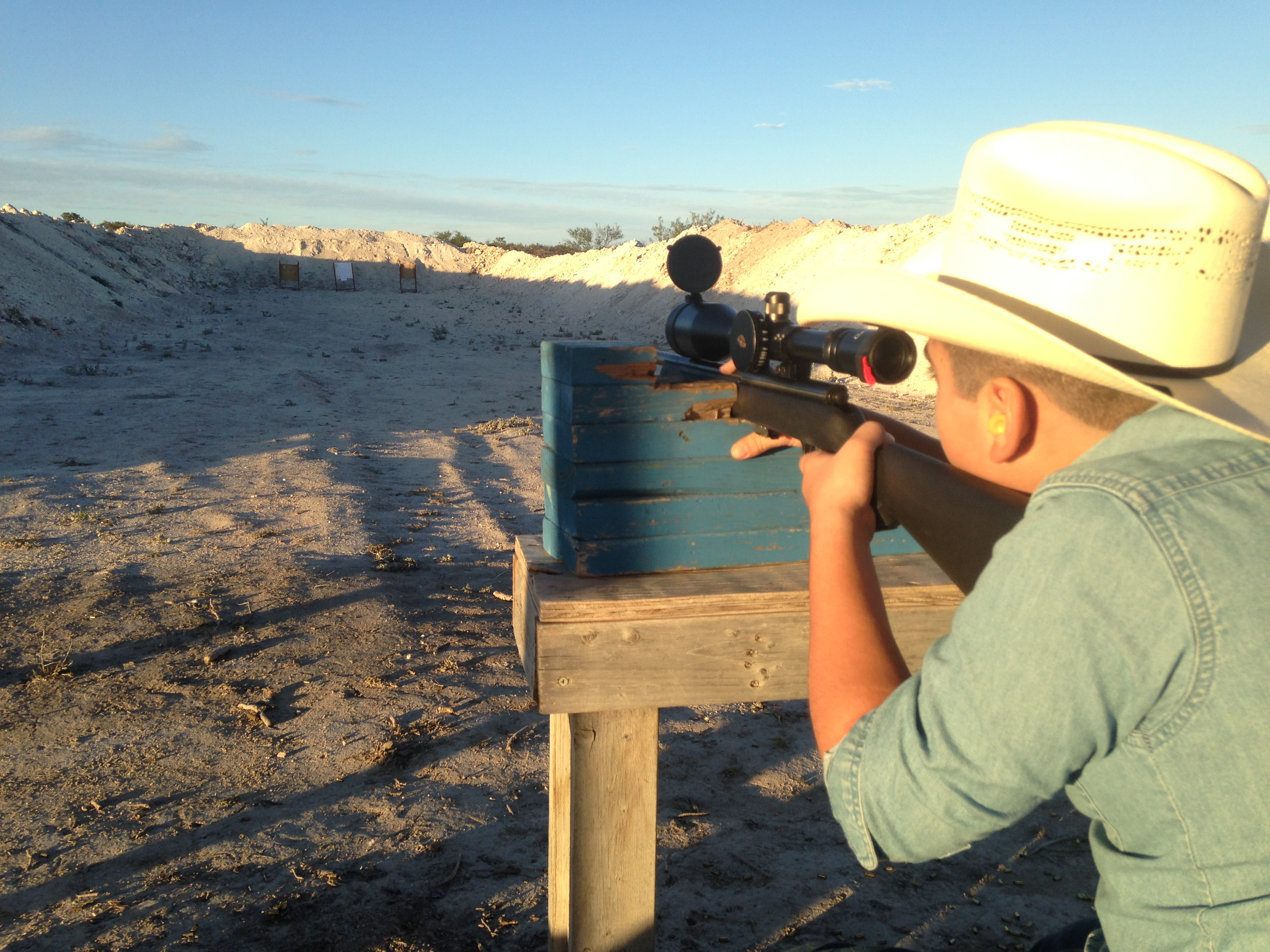
A man target practicing for the hunting seasons

Gun usage in hunting is typically regulated by game category, area within the state, and time period. Regulations for big-game hunting often specify a minimum caliber or muzzle energy for firearms. The use of rifles is often banned for safety reasons in areas with high population densities or limited topographic relief. Regulations may also limit or ban the use of lead in ammunition because of environmental concerns. Specific seasons for bow hunting or muzzle-loading guns are often established to limit competition with hunters using more effective weapons.

Hunting in the United States is not associated with any particular class or culture; a 2006 poll showed seventy-eight percent of Americans supported legal hunting, although relatively few Americans actually hunt. At the beginning of the 21st century, just six percent of Americans hunted. Southerners in states along the eastern seaboard hunted at a rate of five percent, slightly below the national average, and while hunting was more common in other parts of the South at nine percent, these rates did not surpass those of the Plains states, where twelve percent of Midwesterners hunted. Hunting in other areas of the country fell below the national average. Overall, in the 1996–2006 period, the number of hunters over the age of sixteen declined by ten percent, a drop attributable to a number of factors including habitat loss and changes in recreation habits.

=== Varmint hunting ===
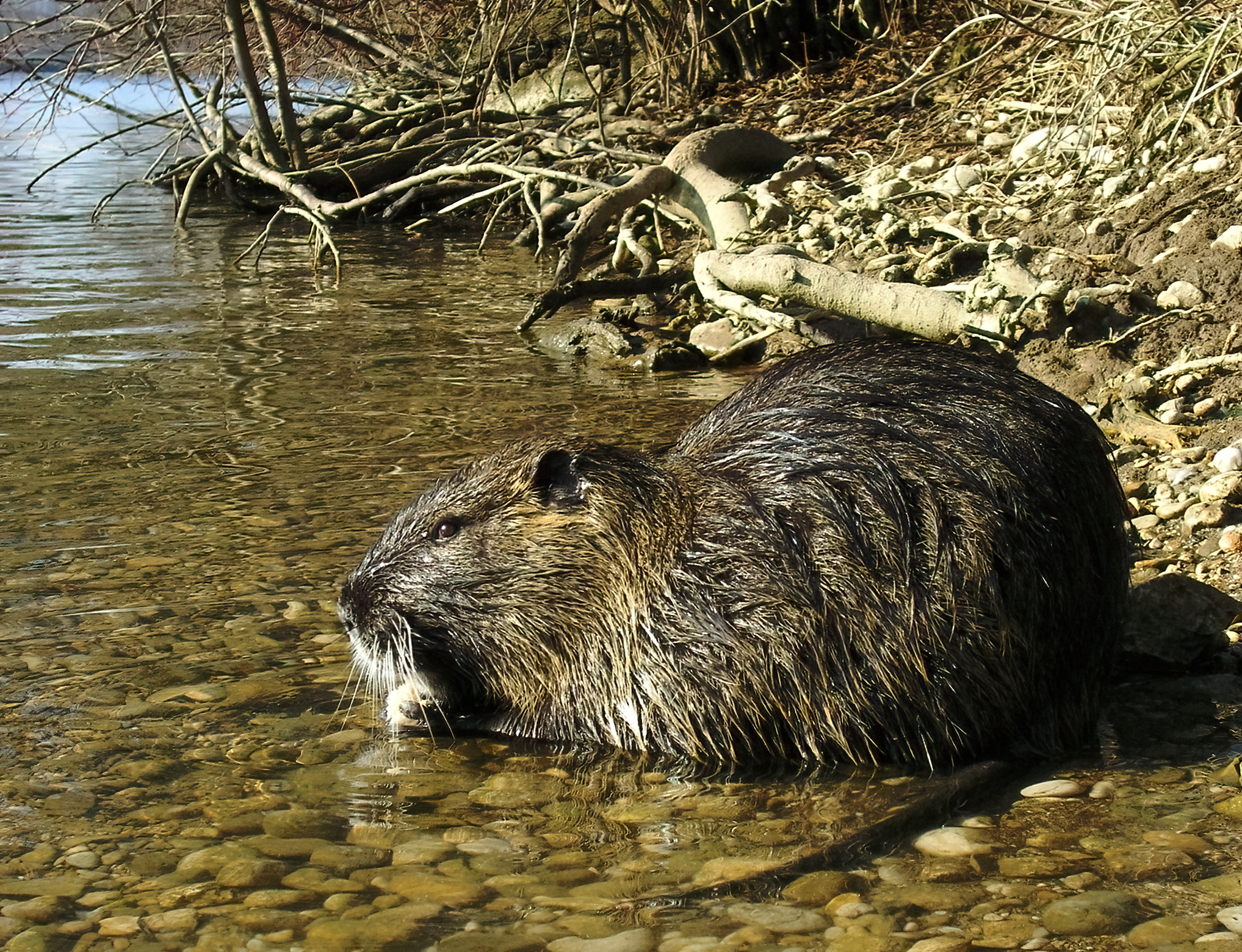
The coypu is hunted as a pest in Louisiana

Varmint hunting is an American phrase for the selective killing of non-game animals seen as pests. While not always an efficient form of pest control, varmint hunting achieves selective control of pests while providing recreation and is much less regulated. Varmint species are often responsible for detrimental effects on crops, livestock, landscaping, infrastructure, and pets. Some animals, such as wild rabbits or squirrels, may be used for fur or meat, but often no use is made of the carcass. Which species are varmints depends on the circumstance and area. Common varmints may include various rodents, coyotes, crows, fox, and feral hogs. Some animals once considered varmints are now protected, such as wolves. In the US state of Louisiana, a non-native rodent, the coypu, has become so destructive to the local ecosystem that the state has initiated a bounty program to help control the population.

=== Fair chase ===
The principles of the fair chase have been a part of the American hunting tradition for over one hundred years. The role of the hunter-conservationist, popularised by Theodore Roosevelt, and perpetuated by Roosevelt's formation of the Boone and Crockett Club, has been central to the development of the modern fair chase tradition. Beyond Fair Chase: The Ethic and Tradition of Hunting, a book by Jim Posewitz, describes fair chase:

"Fundamental to ethical hunting is the idea of fair chase. This concept addresses the balance between the hunter and the hunted. It is a balance that allows hunters to occasionally succeed while animals generally avoid being taken."

When Internet hunting was introduced in 2005, allowing people to hunt over the Internet using remotely controlled guns, the practice was widely criticised by hunters as violating the principles of fair chase. As a representative of the National Rifle Association of America (NRA) explained, "The NRA has always maintained that fair chase, being in the field with your firearm or bow, is an important element of hunting tradition. Sitting at your desk in front of your computer, clicking a mouse, has nothing to do with hunting."

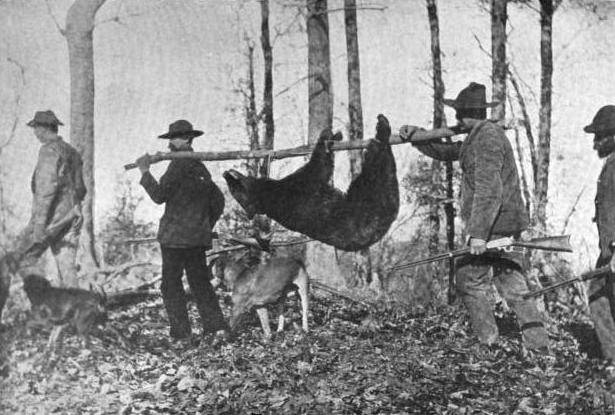
Hunters with an American black bear in the Great Smoky Mountains

The Pope and Young Club, a US-based organization promoting bowhunting, declares that a fair chase shall not involve the taking of animals under the following conditions:

- Helpless in a trap, deep snow or water, or on ice.
- From any power vehicle or power boat.
- By "jacklighting" or shining at night.
- By the use of any tranquilizers or poisons.
- While inside escape-proof fenced enclosures.
- By the use of any power vehicle or power boat for herding or driving animals, including use of aircraft to land alongside or to communicate with or direct a hunter on the ground.
- By the use of electronic devices for attracting, locating or pursuing game or guiding the hunter to such game, or by the use of a bow or arrow to which any electronic device is attached with the exception of lighted nocks and recording devices that cast no light towards the target and do not aid in rangefinding, sighting or shooting the bow.

== Exotic animals ==
Animals such as blackbuck, nilgai, axis deer, fallow deer, zebra, barasingha, gazelle and many other exotic game species can now be found on game farms and ranches in Texas, where they were introduced for sport hunting. These hunters can be found paying high fees to take trophy animals on these controlled ranches.

== See also ==
- Hunting and fishing in Alaska
- Guest ranch
