= Canned hunt =

Trophy hunt without fair chase

A canned hunt is a trophy hunt which is not "fair chase", typically by having game animals kept in a confined area such as in a fenced ranch (i.e. "canned") to prevent the animals' escape and make tracking easier for the hunter, in order to increase the likelihood of the hunter obtaining a kill. The term has been used for driven grouse shooting, in which large areas of Britain are farmed for red grouse. According to WordNet, a canned hunt is a "hunt for animals that have been raised on game ranches until they are mature enough to be killed for trophy collections."

There have been criticisms of this method of hunting from both hunters and animal welfare advocacy groups. Canned hunting and vanity hunting are derogatory terms not generally applied by the practitioners of activities so described.

== Legislation in the U.S. ==
Canned hunting has been banned or restricted in 20 states of the United States, including Alabama, Arizona, California, Connecticut, Delaware, Georgia, Hawaii, Maryland, Massachusetts, Minnesota, Mississippi, Montana, Nevada, North Carolina, Oregon, Rhode Island, Virginia, Wisconsin and Wyoming.

In 2006, Alabama was the most recent state to pass legislation banning many forms of canned hunting. In 2007, a bill in the New York State Legislature to ban all canned hunting of certain "exotic" animals was defeated by legislative inaction.

== Criticism ==
A number of groups object to the practice of canned hunting for reasons such as cruelty to animals or that it takes away the hunting ethics known as "fair chase".

The Humane Society of the United States (HSUS) criticizes canned hunting. In a statement, the HSUS called canned hunts "cruel and brutal activities", in which the hunted animal has "absolutely no chance of escape". It went on to say that animals have been "psychologically conditioned to behave as a target by life in captivity", among other objections.

Some hunting groups, especially those who focus on hunters' ethics, also object to canned hunting. These objections are on the grounds of "fair chase", the idea that an animal has a fair chance of escaping the hunter, and it's not too easy for the hunter to kill the animal. It is believed that canned hunts remove these elements.

Hunting groups such as the Pope and Young Club and the Boone and Crockett Club do not accept animals killed in canned hunts for inclusion in their record books. Boone and Crockett Club refers to the activity as a "canned shoot", as they claim that there is no hunting involved.

Safari Club International no longer accepts animals killed in canned hunts for inclusion in its record books and award categories.

In 2014, 62 cities representing every inhabited continent participated in the first-ever global march against canned hunting, organized by the Campaign Against Canned Hunting.

== In the news ==
In 1997, the Journalist Roger Cook exposed the evils of canned hunting in an edition of The Cook Report entitled "Making a Killing". In 2005, internet hunting became a major news story when a man in Texas set up a webcam and remotely controlled gun to allow hunters to shoot from their computers. According to the Humane Society, most internet hunts involve game ranches where animals are kept penned, making them essentially canned hunts.

On August 15, 2006, Troy Gentry, half of the country music singing duo Montgomery Gentry, appeared in federal court in Duluth, Minnesota, charged with canned hunting. Federal prosecutors allege that Gentry bought a bear named "Cubby" from Lee Marvin Greenly, shot the tame bear while it was in an enclosed pen, tagged the bear as if it had been killed in the wild, and then arranged for the editing of a videotape of the alleged "wild" kill. Gentry and Greenly were said to face a maximum penalty of five years in federal prison and a $20,000 fine if convicted. On November 27, 2006, Gentry pleaded guilty to a charge of falsely tagging the bear. Under the plea agreement, he agreed to pay a $15,000 fine, give up hunting, fishing and trapping in Minnesota for 5 years, and forfeit both the stuffed bear and the bow used to shoot the animal in 2004. Gentry posted a statement on the duo's website on November 9, 2010, apologizing for his actions.

A lesser known incident occurred in late 2003, two years prior to the infamous hunting accident, when then-Vice President Dick Cheney participated in a canned hunt at the Rolling Rock Club in Ligonier Township, Pennsylvania. Cheney and nine companions killed 417 out of 500 ringneck pheasants, of which the Vice President killed 70, and an unknown number of mallard ducks.

In 2006, the South African Minister of Environmental Affairs, Marthinus van Schalkwyk, announced new laws to stop the practise of "canned hunting" in his country. The South African Environment Minister announced long-awaited restrictions on lion hunting, declaring he was sickened by wealthy tourists shooting tamed lions from the back of a truck and felling rhinos with a bow and arrow. This comes in response to the imbroglio created over the potential canned hunt of the African rhinoceros 'Baixinha.' Dismissing threats of legal action by the hunting industry, Marthinus Van Schalkwyk said the new law would ban "canned" hunting of big predators and rhinos in small enclosures that offer them no means of escape. In addition, lions bred in captivity would have to be released into the open for at least two years before they could be hunted. Van Schalkwyk said a previously proposed six-month delay would not give lions enough time to develop self-defence instincts. "Hunting should be about fair chase ... testing the wits of a hunter against that of the animal," he told a press conference. "Over the years that got eroded and now we are trying to re-establish that principle." This measure was later overturned.

In May 2007, a much-reported hunting trip involved the killing of a 1,051 lb (477 kg) pet pig in an alleged canned hunt. The pig was named "Monster Pig" by the media and was thought to be a feral hog, but it was soon discovered that the pig, previously named "Fred", had been someone's pet and was then sold to a hunting facility only a brief time before he was killed. On May 3, paying customers Mike Stone and his 11-year-old son Jamison hunted the pig in a 150-acre (0.61 km^{2}) fenced enclosure. Jamison shot Fred a total of eight times over a period of three hours.

A June 2007 story on CNN detailed canned hunting in South Africa and includes a video of a canned lion hunt where the animal is shot against a fence. On November 30, 2014, CBS's 60 Minutes broadcast a story ("The Lion Whisperer") about one man's sanctuary in South Africa for 26 lions, raised in captivity, which he rescued from the fate of canned lion hunting. In November 2015, the Professional Hunters' Association of South Africa (PHASA) voted to disassociate itself from the practice of canned lion hunting in South Africa. Unless the conservation value of canned lion hunting is demonstrated to PHASA, the organization will remain against the practice and, under penalty of expulsion, no PHASA members will be permitted to participate in canned lion hunts. In November 2017, PHASA came under fire over the body's reversal of its 2015 policy against the hunting of captive-bred lions.

== See also ==
- Turkey shoot
- Big game hunting
- Cruelty to animals
- Hunting
- Hunting license
