= Wainwright Airport =

Wainwright Airport may refer to:

== Canada ==
- Wainwright, Alberta
  - Wainwright Aerodrome (IATA: YWV, ICAO: CYWV), the public aerodrome serving the town and surrounding communities.
  - Wainwright (Health Centre) Heliport (TC: CWH2)
- CFB Wainwright
  - Wainwright/Camp Wainwright Field Airport (TC: CFF7), located at the base
  - Wainwright/Wainwright (Field 21) Airport (TC: CFP7), located approximately 7 NM (13 km; 8.1 mi) west of the base.

== United States ==
- Wainwright Airport (Alaska) in Wainwright, Alaska, United States (IATA: AWI, ICAO: PAWI),
