= Aquaculture in Alaska =

Aquaculture in Alaska is dominated by the production of shellfish and aquatic plants. These include Pacific oysters, blue mussels, littleneck clams, scallops, and bull kelp.

Finfish farming has been prohibited in Alaska since 1990 by the 16.40.210 Alaskan statute, however non-profit mariculture continues to provide a steady supply of aquaculture in the state. Many organizations that helped the ban, now encourage the growing of shellfish and other oysters.

== Overview ==
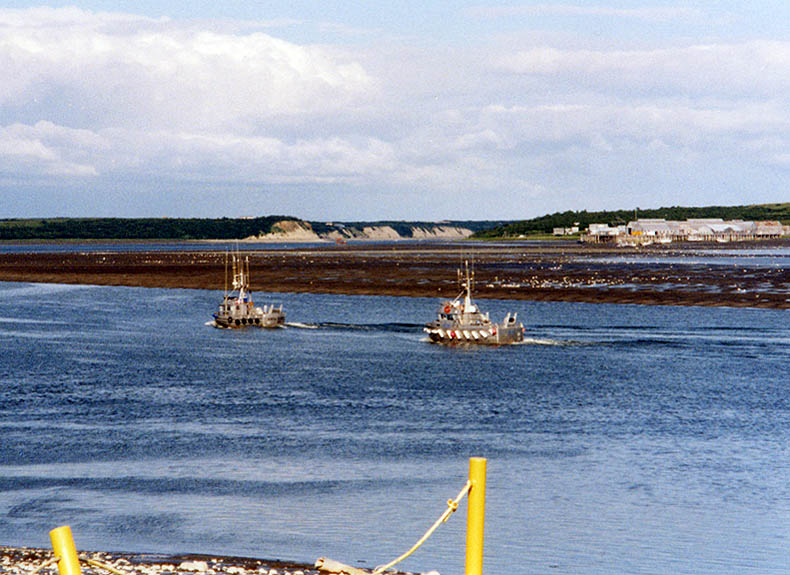
Salmon boats fishing on the Naknek River.

Alaskan aquaculture is an important resource not just for the state, but for the entire country. Alaska is filled with a variety of aquatic fish, shellfish, plants, and other species that all play an important role in the aquaculture process. Commercial salmon and herring fisheries dominate Alaskan harvesting and production and harvesting sights are located on the coast line throughout the state, producing an average of 750 million pounds each year. Commercial shellfish fisheries also greatly contribute to annual statistics and at its high point 400 million pounds of shellfish have been produced in one year.

In 2025, Alaska governor Mike Dunleavy (politician) proposed lifting the ban on finned-fish farming.

== See also ==
- Alaska salmon fishery
- Cook Inlet Aquaculture Association
- Southern Southeast Regional Aquaculture Association
