= Deadhorse Airport =

Airport in Alaska

Deadhorse Airport Prudhoe Airport
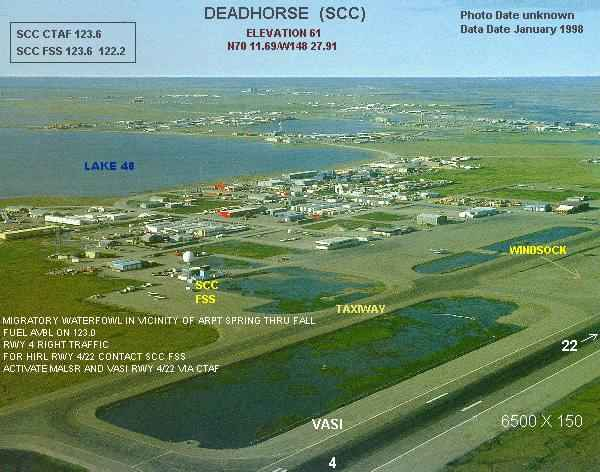
- IATA: SCC; ICAO: PASC; FAA LID: SCC

Summary
- Airport type: Public
- Owner: State of Alaska DOT&PF - Northern Region
- Location: Deadhorse, Alaska
- Elevation AMSL: 64 ft (20 m)
- Coordinates: 70°11′41″N 148°27′55″W

Map
- Location of Deadhorse Airport

Runways
Direction	Length		Surface
Direction	ft	m	Surface
6/24	6,500	1,981	Asphalt

Statistics (2016)
- Aircraft operations: 32,912
- Based aircraft: 10
- Passengers: 82,100
- Freight: 32,000,000 lbs
- Source: Federal Aviation Administration

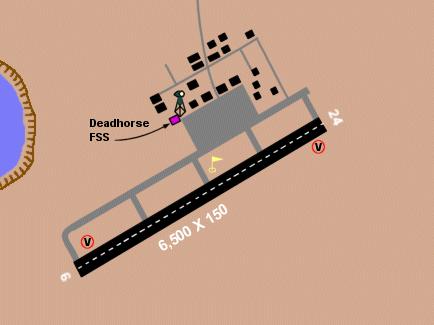
Diagram of Deadhorse Airport. US FAA image.

Deadhorse Airport (IATA: SCC, ICAO: PASC, FAA LID: SCC) is a public airport located in Deadhorse on the North Slope of Alaska. It can be accessed from Fairbanks via the Elliott and Dalton highways. It is near Prudhoe Bay and is sometimes also called Prudhoe Airport.

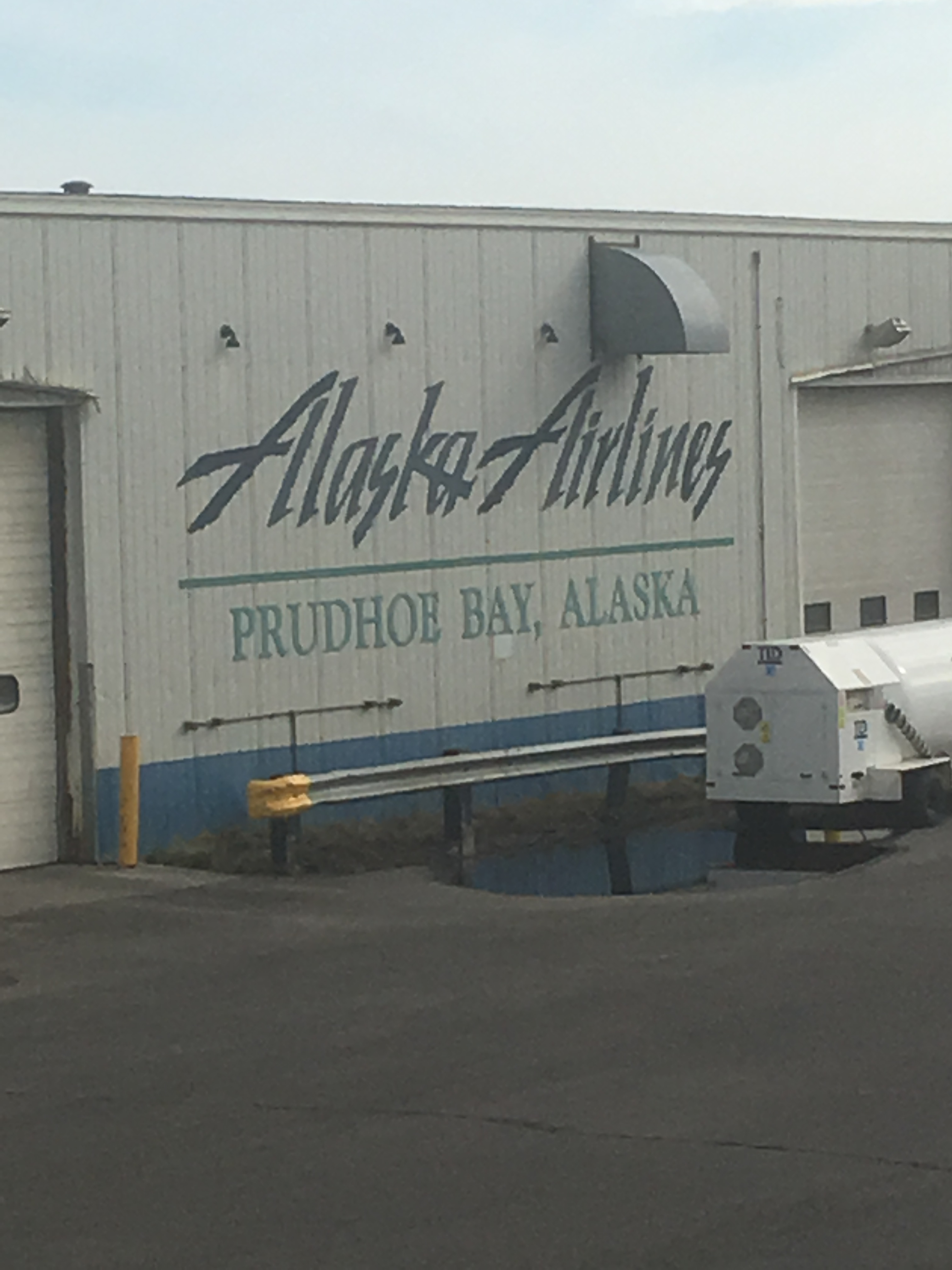
The airport from a 737 aircraft

== Facilities and aircraft ==
Deadhorse Airport covers 6,506 acres (2,633 ha) and has one 6,500 x 150 ft. (1,981 x 46 m) paved runway (5/23).

Deadhorse Airport, on average has 10 aircraft on the field, three single-engine aircraft, two multiengine aircraft and 5 helicopters.

For the 12-month period ending August 22, 2008, the airport had 19,710 aircraft operations, averaging 54 per day: 54% general aviation, 28% air taxi, 18% scheduled commercial and 1% military.

== Airlines and destinations ==
Airlines	Destinations
Alaska Airlines	Anchorage
Wright Air Service	Fairbanks, Kaktovik/Barter Island, Nuiqsut, Utqiagvik

The airport first opened in April 1970, and does not have a control tower. The elevation of the airport is 67.4 ft (20.5m).

=== Historical air service ===
Wien Air Alaska began serving the airport during the early 1970s with Boeing 737-200 jet service operated nonstop to both Anchorage and Fairbanks. By 1984, Wien was operating direct, no change of plane 737 service to the lower 48 states in the U.S. on a daily basis with a routing of Prudhoe Bay - Fairbanks - Anchorage - Seattle - Oakland - Phoenix. Western Airlines briefly served Prudhoe Bay during early 1982 with nonstop jet service to Anchorage and was the only major U.S. air carrier at the time to directly serve the airport. Alaska Airlines began serving Prudhoe Bay in December 1981 with Boeing 737-200 service to Anchorage and Fairbanks. In 1982, Alaska Airlines was operating a multi-stop 737 service on a routing of Prudhoe Bay - Anchorage - Cordova - Yakutat - Juneau - Sitka - Seattle. Also in 1982, Alaska Airlines and Continental Airlines were cooperating with daily no change of plane interchange jet service from the lower 48 states flying a routing of Tulsa - Wichita - Denver - Portland - Anchorage - Fairbanks - Prudhoe Bay. By 1985, MarkAir was operating nonstop Boeing 737-200 service to Anchorage, Fairbanks and Barrow.

== Statistics ==
Top airlines at MRI (September 2021 - August 2022)
Rank	Airline	Passengers	Percent of market share
1	Alaska Airlines	39,840	74.35%
2	Horizon Air (Alaska Airlines)	9,340	17.43%
3	Wright Air Service	4,320	8.06%
4	70 North	80	0.16%

Top domestic destinations: September 2021 – August 2022
Rank	City	Airport	Passengers	Carriers
1	(Alaska) Anchorage	Ted Stevens Anchorage International Airport	24,520	Alaska
2	(Alaska) Nuiqsut	Nuiqsut Airport	710	Wright
3	(Alaska) Utqiaġvik	Wiley Post-Will Rogers Memorial Airport	580	Wright
4	(Alaska) Fairbanks	Fairbanks International Airport	540	Wright
5	(Alaska) Kaktovik / Barter Island	Barter Island LRRS Airport	470	Wright

== See also ==
- List of airports in Alaska
