= Nuiqsut Airport =

- IATA: NUI; ICAO: PAQT; FAA LID: AQT

Summary
- Airport type: Public
- Owner: North Slope Borough
- Serves: Nuiqsut, Alaska
- Elevation AMSL: 38 ft (12 m)
- Coordinates: 70°12′36″N 151°00′20″W

Map
- Location of Nuiqsut Airport

Runways
Direction	Length		Surface
Direction	ft	m	Surface
4/22	4,343	1,324	Gravel

Statistics (2005)
- Aircraft operations: 1,800
- Source: Federal Aviation Administration

Nuiqsut Airport (IATA: NUI, ICAO: PAQT, FAA LID: AQT) is a public use airport located in Nuiqsut, a city in the North Slope Borough of the U.S. state of Alaska. It is owned by North Slope Borough.

Although most U.S. airports use the same three-letter location identifier for the FAA and IATA, this airport is assigned AQT by the FAA and NUI by the IATA. The airport's ICAO identifier is PAQT.

== Facilities and aircraft ==
Nuiqsut Airport has one runway designated 4/22 with a gravel surface measuring 4,343 by 90 feet (1,324 x 27 m).

For the 12-month period ending December 31, 2005, the airport had 1,800 aircraft operations, an average of 150 per month: 83% air taxi, 11% military and 6% general aviation.

== Airlines and destinations ==
Airlines	Destinations
Wright Air Service	Deadhorse/Prudhoe Bay, Utqiagvik

=== Top destinations ===
Busiest domestic routes out of NUI (June 2010 - May 2011)
Rank	City	Passengers	Carriers
—	(Alaska) Utqiagvik, AK	1,000	Frontier Flying, Hageland
—	(Alaska) Deadhorse, AK	1,000	Frontier Flying, Hageland

== See also ==
- List of airports in Alaska
