= Wainwright Airport (Alaska) =

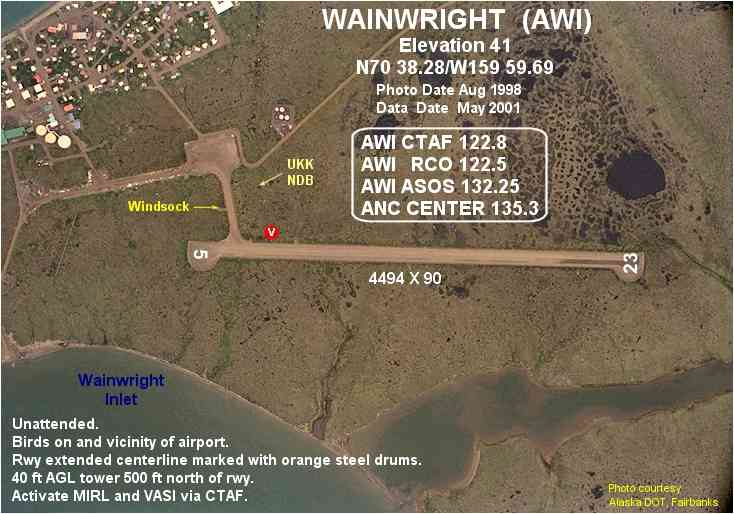
- IATA: AIN; ICAO: PAWI; FAA LID: AWI

Summary
- Airport type: Public
- Owner: North Slope Borough
- Serves: Wainwright, Alaska
- Elevation AMSL: 45 ft / 14 m
- Coordinates: 70°38′17″N 159°59′41″W

Map
- Location of airport in Alaska

Runways
Direction	Length		Surface
Direction	ft	m	Surface
5/23	4,494	1,370	Gravel

Statistics (2006)
- Aircraft operations: 1,100
- Source: Federal Aviation Administration

Wainwright Airport (IATA: AIN, ICAO: PAWI, FAA LID: AWI, formerly 5WW) is a public use airport located in Wainwright, a city in the North Slope Borough of the U.S. state of Alaska. The airport is owned by the North Slope Borough.

As per Federal Aviation Administration records, the airport had 3,547 passenger boardings (enplanements) in calendar year 2008, 3,770 enplanements in 2009, and 4,129 in 2010. It is included in the National Plan of Integrated Airport Systems for 2011–2015, which categorized it as a non-primary commercial service airport (between 2,500 and 10,000 enplanements per year).

Although many U.S. airports use the same three-letter location identifier for the FAA and IATA, this airport is assigned AWI by the FAA and AIN by the IATA. The airport's ICAO identifier is PAWI.

== History ==
The airport was built in 1957 to support the Distant Early Warning Line Radar station at Wainwright (LIZ-3). The station was logistically supported by the 711th Aircraft Control and Warning Squadron, which was based at Cape Lisburne Air Force Station, although civilian contract workers operated Point Lay.

The radar station was upgraded in the late 1980s with new radars and in 1989 was re-designated part of the North Warning System (NWS) as a Long Range Radar Site, A-16. The LRR site was inactivated in 2007 due to soil erosion and budget concerns. The airport remains open to support the small settlement under the control of the Pacific Air Forces Regional Support Center based at Joint Base Elmendorf–Richardson.

== Facilities and aircraft ==
Wainwright Airport resides at elevation of 45 feet (14 m) above mean sea level. It has one runway designated 5/23 with a gravel surface measuring 4,494 by 110 feet (1,370 x 34 m). For the 12-month period ending January 1, 2006, the airport had 1,100 aircraft operations, an average of 91 per month: 73% air taxi and 27% general aviation.

== Airlines and destinations ==
Airlines	Destinations
Wright Air Service	Atqasuk, Utqiagvik

Before its bankruptcy and cessation of all operations, Ravn Alaska served the airport from multiple locations.

=== Statistics ===
Carrier shares: January – December 2012
Carrier	Passengers (arriving and departing)
Hageland	6,220(99.4%)
Era Aviation	40(0.6%)

Top domestic destinations: Jan. – Dec. 2012
Rank	City	Airport	Passengers
1	Utqiaġvik, AK	Wiley Post/Will Rogers Memorial (BRW)	2,790
2	Atqasuk, AK	Atqasuk Edward Burnell Sr. Memorial (ATK)	180

== See also ==
- Alaskan Air Command
- Distant Early Warning Line
- Eleventh Air Force
- List of airports in Alaska
- North Warning System
