= Wiley Post–Will Rogers Memorial Airport =

Airport serving Utqiaġvik, Alaska, United States

Wiley Post–Will Rogers International Airport
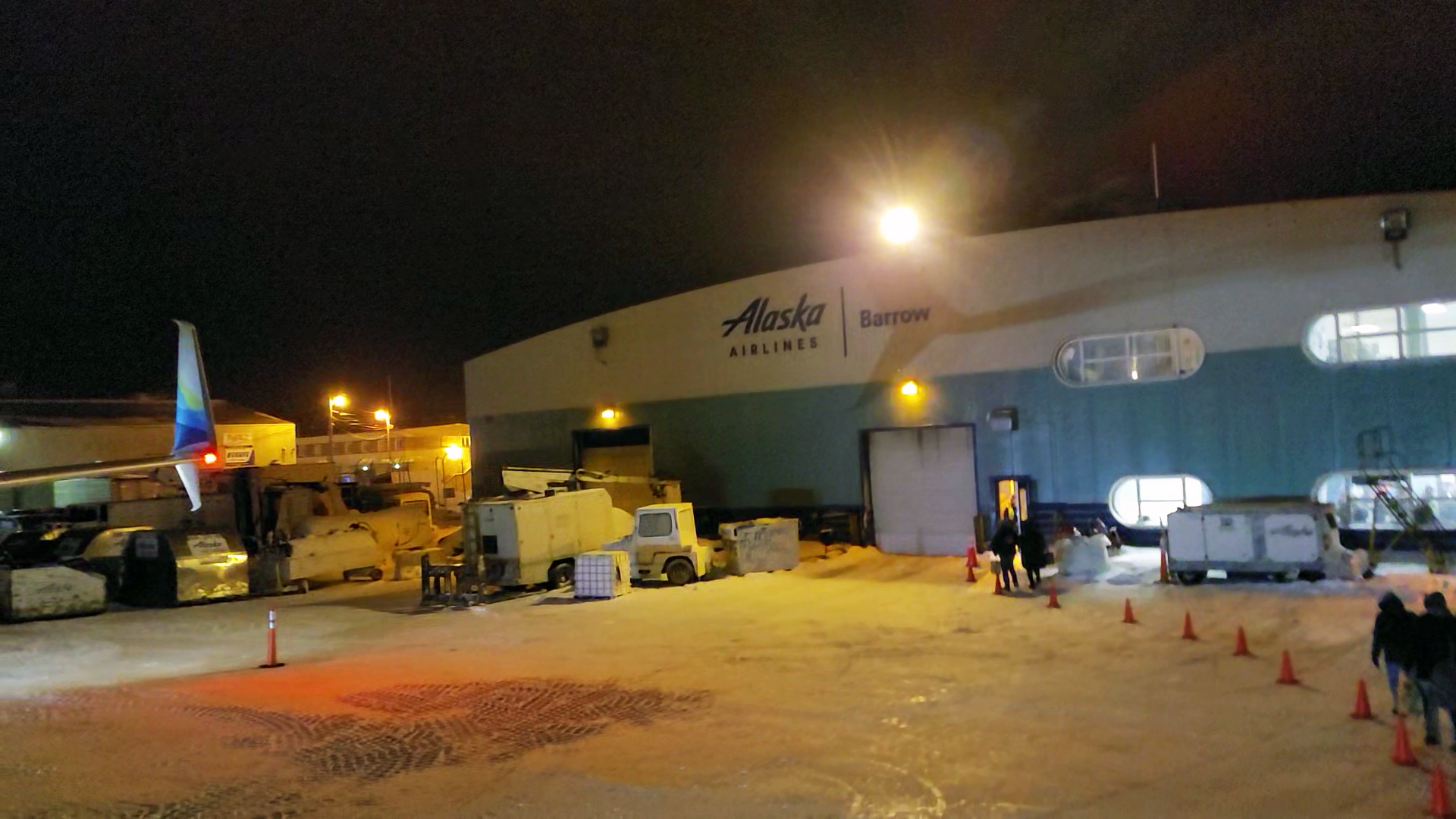
- The airport's terminal, as viewed from an Alaska Airlines aircraft on the tarmac
- IATA: BRW; ICAO: PABR; FAA LID: BRW

Summary
- Airport type: Public
- Owner: State of Alaska DOT&PF – Northern Region
- Location: Utqiaġvik, Alaska
- Elevation AMSL: 44 ft / 13 m
- Coordinates: 71°17′08″N 156°45′58″W

Maps
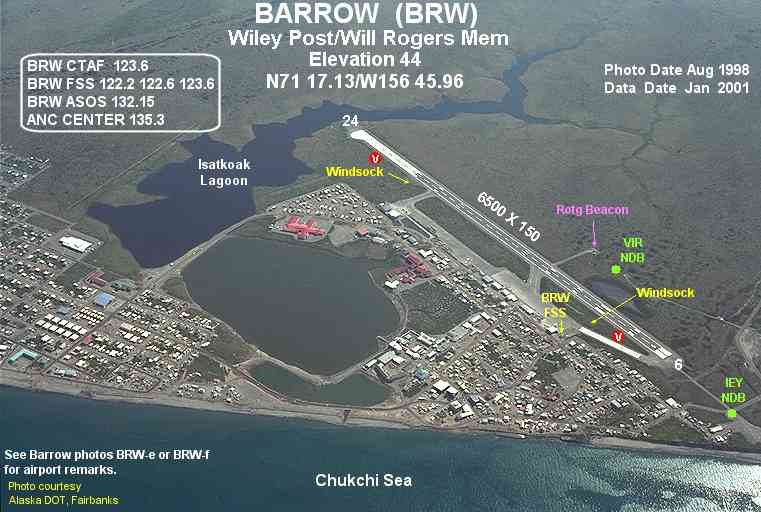
- Airport diagram

- Location of Wiley Post–Will Rogers Memorial Airport

Runways
Direction	Length		Surface
Direction	ft	m	Surface
8/26	7,100	2,164	Asphalt

Statistics (2015)
- Aircraft operations: 12,010 (2014)
- Based aircraft: 8
- Passengers: 88,840
- Freight: 24,000,000 lbs
- Source: Federal Aviation Administration

Wiley Post–Will Rogers Memorial Airport, (IATA: BRW, ICAO: PABR, FAA LID: BRW) often referred to as Post/Rogers Memorial, is a public airport located in Utqiaġvik (formerly Barrow), the largest city and borough seat of the North Slope Borough of the U.S. state of Alaska. The airport is owned by the Alaska Department of Transportation & Public Facilities. Situated on the Chukchi Sea at a latitude of 71.29°N, it is the northernmost airport in United States territory.

The airport is named after American humorist Will Rogers and aviator Wiley Post, both of whom died about 9 mi (14 km) away at Point Barrow in a 1935 airplane crash.

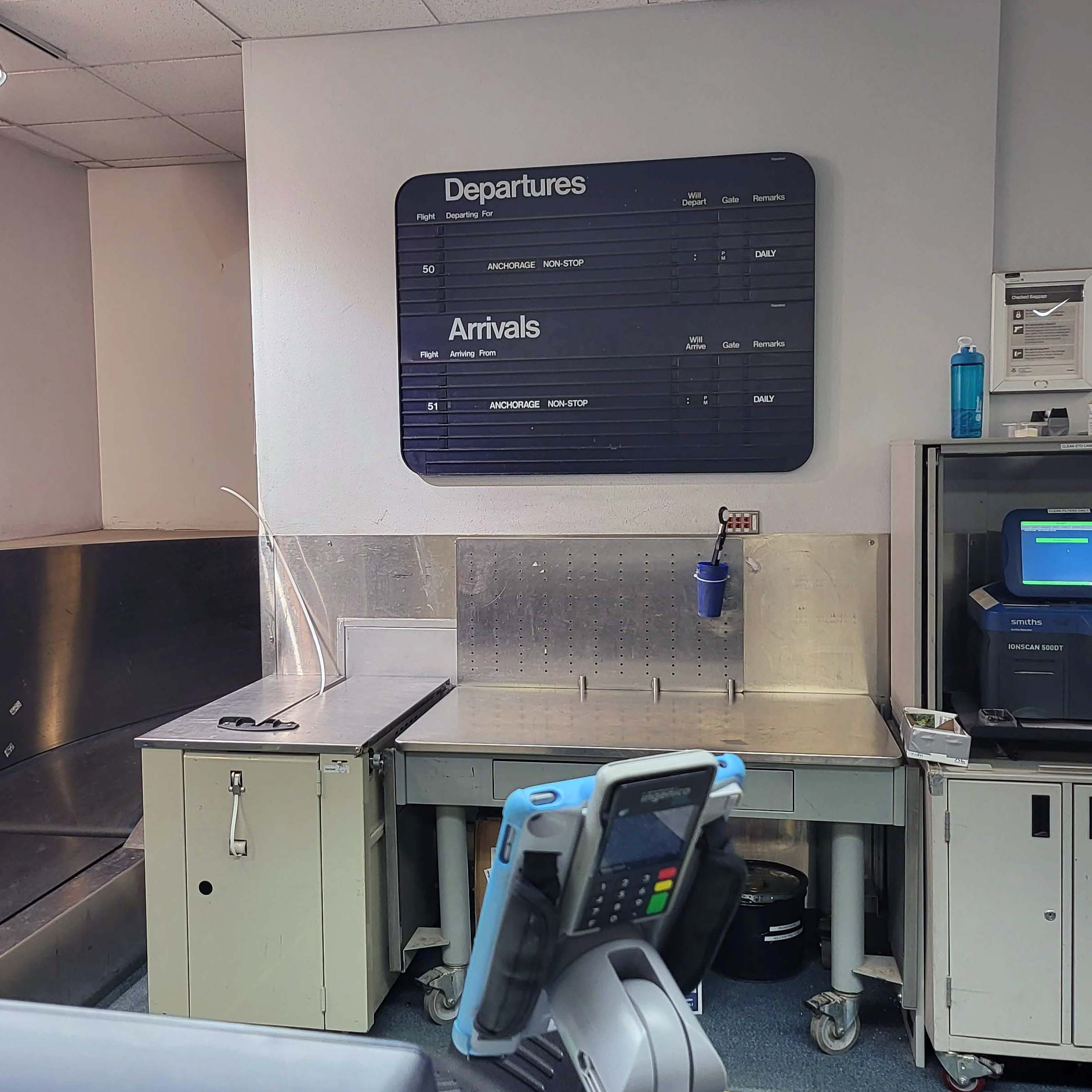
Flight board showing one departing and one arriving flight at Wiley Post-Will Rogers Memorial Airport.

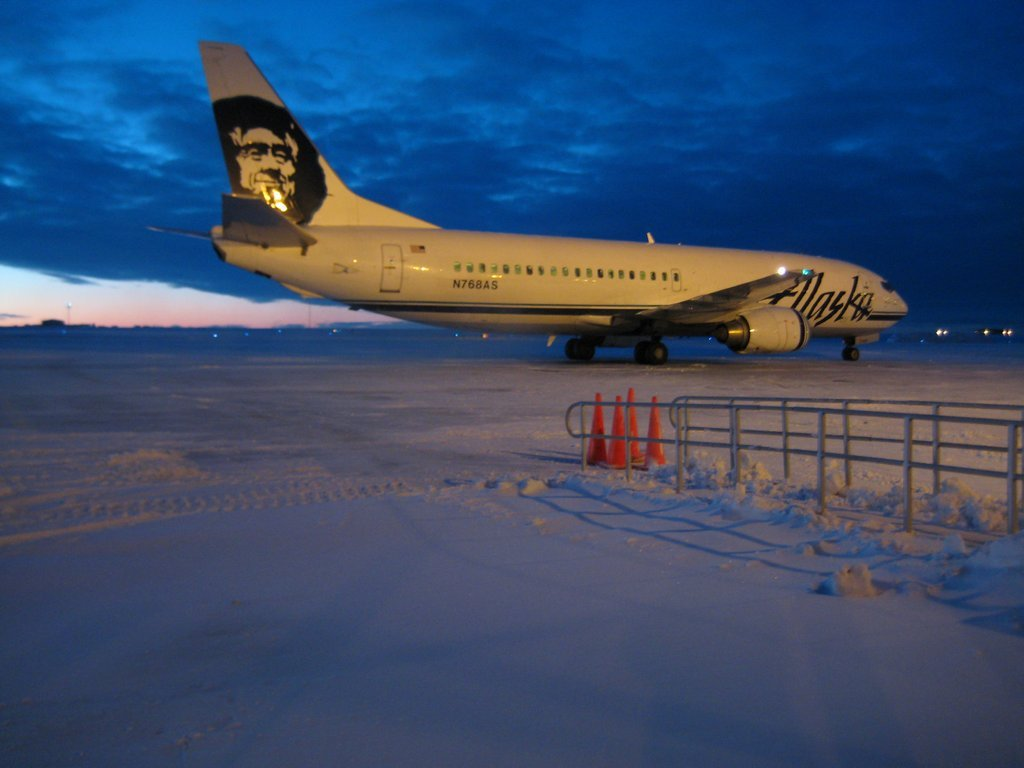
Alaska Airlines 737-400 combi aircraft at Post/Rogers Memorial Airport, December 2007. Note that it is twilight. Even though the sun does not rise in December, it gets close enough to the horizon to provide illumination.

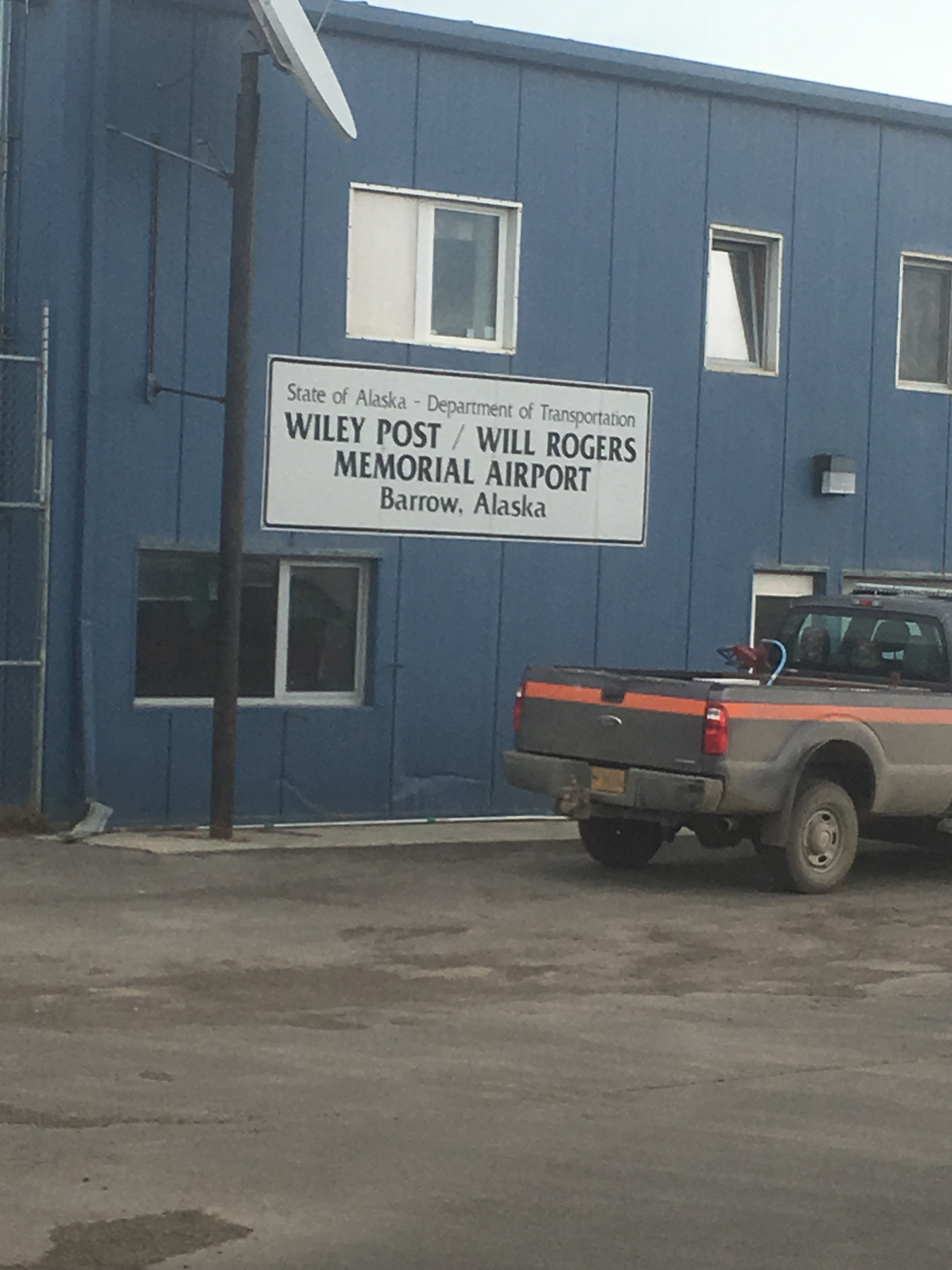
Airport from the unpaved street

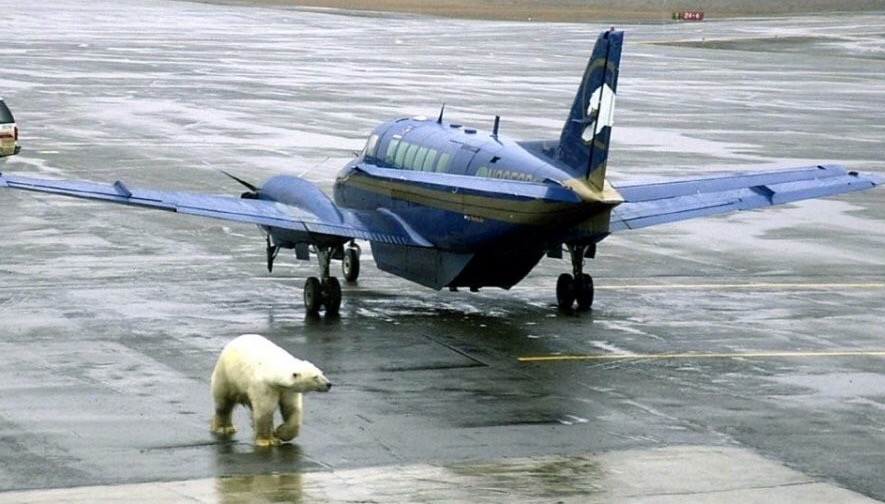
Polar bear at Wiley Post–Will Rogers Memorial Airport, 2003

== Facilities and aircraft ==
Wiley Post–Will Rogers Memorial Airport has one asphalt paved runway (8/26) measuring 7,100 ft × 150 ft (2,164 m × 46 m).

For the 12-month period ending January 11, 2011, the airport had 12,010 aircraft operations, an average of 33 per day: 50% air taxi, 37% general aviation, 12% scheduled commercial and fewer than 1% military. At that time there were eight aircraft based at this airport: one jet, three helicopters, one multi-engine, and three single-engine.

== Airlines and destinations ==
=== Passenger ===
Airlines	Destinations
Alaska Airlines	Anchorage
Wright Air Service	Atqasuk, Deadhorse/Prudhoe Bay, Nuiqsut, Point Lay, Wainwright

== Statistics ==
Carrier shares (November 2019 – October 2020)
Carrier	Passengers (arriving and departing)
Alaska Airlines	41,960

=== Top destinations ===
Busiest routes from BRW (November 2021 – October 2022)
Rank	City	Passengers
1	(Alaska) Anchorage, AK	30,020
2	(Alaska) Wainwright, AK	2,430
3	(Alaska) Atqasuk, AK	1,290

== See also ==
- List of airports in Alaska
