= Hunting and fishing in Alaska =

Hunting and fishing in Alaska are common both for recreation and subsistence.

== Hunting ==
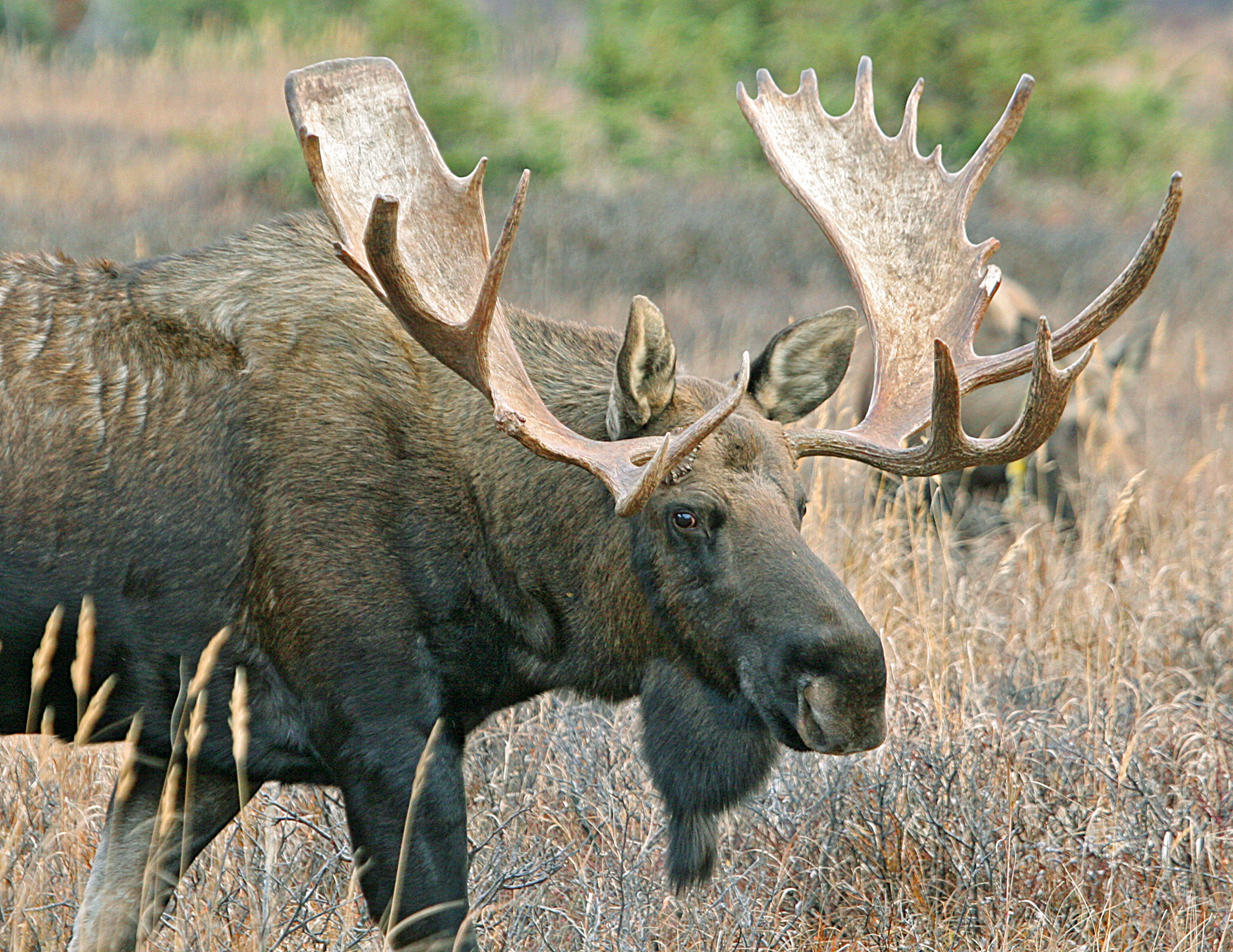
The Alaska moose is the largest deer species in North America.

Alaska is a popular hunting destination. Hunters come from all over the world to hunt big game animals such as the brown bear, black bear, moose, and caribou. Mountain goat hunts are also quickly becoming a rising interest to hunters. The reason as to why Alaska is such a popular hunting destination is because it is home to some of the world’s largest big game animals. Alaska’s species of brown bear and moose are the largest in the world. According to the Boone and Crockett Club, Alaska has a rich history of world record brown bear, moose, and caribou, taken by various hunters. Hunters are able to partake in an Alaskan hunt by obtaining hunting licenses and game tags, and also following the areas laws and regulations. The most common weapons among hunters are rifles, large handguns, and bows.

== Fishing ==
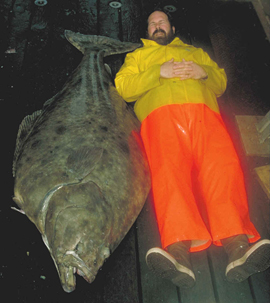
Alaskan halibut often weigh over 100 pounds (45 kg). Specimens under 20 pounds (9.1 kg) are often thrown back when caught.

With a land area of 586,412 square miles (1,518,800 km^{2}), not counting the Aleutian islands, Alaska is one-fifth the size of lower 48 states, and as Ken Schultz notes in his chapter on Alaska "Alaska is a bounty of more than 3,000 rivers, more than 3 million lakes, and some 34,000 miles of coastal shoreline — numbers that stagger the imagination, underscore the wealth of opportunities for anglers, and translate into some of North America’s premier fishing." A greater percentage of Alaskans fish than residents of any other state. Alaska features several different types of fishing. The two most popular are salmon fishing and halibut fishing. Homer claims the title of “halibut fishing capital of the world.” Other common types of fishing are deep sea fishing, fly fishing, and ice fishing. Fishermen have a variety of fish that they can catch including: salmon, various species of trout, northern pike, arctic char, dolly varden, and grayling. Alaska Fishing Licenses are required by law in Alaska for both residents and non-residents.

== See also ==
- Commercial fishing in Alaska
- Aquaculture in Alaska
- List of lakes in Alaska
- List of rivers in Alaska
