= Davezilla =

American blogger

Davezilla.com is a humor website, run by Digital Strategist, Dave Linabury since December, 1994. It began as a link portal to items of interest to Linabury, humor and hacking links. In 1996, Linabury began adding his cartoons. When the first blogging platforms emerged, Davezilla switched to a daily site, focusing mainly on humor at the suggestion of blogger Jeffrey Zeldman. Since then, it has become a popular destination for bloggers. In 2000, the site gained notoriety by receiving a Cease and desist letter from Seyfarth Shaw, the legal representation for the Toho Corporation of Japan due to the website's name being partly derived from the word "Godzilla." After Linabury posted the C&D letter on numerous blogs and legal websites, Seyfarth Shaw backed off.

== Anagram Interviews ==
In 2000, Davezilla.com began running "Anagram Interviews", a concept pioneered by Linabury in which a fake interview was conducted with answers composed only of anagrams of the interviewee's name. For example, this excerpt from the interview with Paris Hilton:

Davezilla: “First off, how do you start the week?”

Paris Hilton: “I plan or shit.”

Davezilla: “Um, Paris? What are you doing under the table? Drop something?”
Paris Hilton: “Lost hairpin.”

Davezilla: “I heard you once seduced Ralph Lauren.”

Paris Hilton: “I sit on Ralph.”

== Personal information ==
Dave Linabury was born January 30, 1964. He is currently a full-time illustrator in the Detroit area. He has been interviewed by Wired magazine, CNET and several other publications on the subject of blogging.
