= Atqasuk Edward Burnell Sr. Memorial Airport =

Airport in Alaska

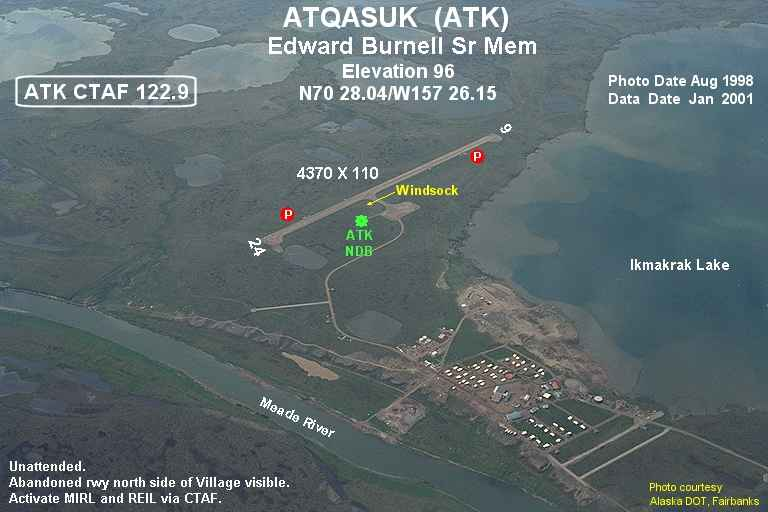
- IATA: ATK; ICAO: PATQ; FAA LID: ATK

Summary
- Airport type: Public
- Owner: North Slope Borough
- Serves: Atqasuk, Alaska
- Elevation AMSL: 101 ft (31 m)
- Coordinates: 70°28′02″N 157°26′08″W

Map
- Location of airport in Alaska

Runways
Direction	Length		Surface
Direction	ft	m	Surface
6/24	4,370	1,332	Gravel

Statistics (2015)
- Aircraft operations: 530
- Based aircraft: 0
- Passengers: 4,129
- Freight: 893,000 lbs
- Source: Federal Aviation Administration

Atqasuk Edward Burnell Sr. Memorial Airport (IATA: ATK, ICAO: PATQ, FAA LID: ATK) is an uncontrolled public use airport located one nautical mile (2 km) south of the central business district of Atqasuk, a city in North Slope Borough, Alaska, United States. The airport is owned by North Slope Borough.

As per Federal Aviation Administration records, the airport had 2,105 passenger boardings (enplanements) in calendar year 2008, 2,107 enplanements in 2009, and 2,499 in 2010. It is included in the National Plan of Integrated Airport Systems for 2011–2015, which categorized it as a general aviation facility (the commercial service category requires at least 2,500 enplanements per year).

== Facilities and aircraft ==
Atqasuk Edward Burnell Sr. Memorial Airport resides at elevation of 101 feet (31 m) above mean sea level. It has one runway designated 6/24 with a gravel surface measuring 4,370 by 90 feet (1,332 x 27 m). For the 12-month period ending January 1, 2006, the airport had 530 aircraft operations, an average of 44 per month: 94% air taxi and 6% general aviation.

== Airlines and destinations ==
Airlines	Destinations
Wright Air Service	Utqiagvik, Wainwright

=== Statistics ===
Carrier shares: January – December 2021
Carrier	Passengers (arriving and departing)
Ravn Alaska	4,150(100%)

Top domestic destinations: January – December 2015
Rank	City	Airport	Passengers
1	Utqiagvik, Alaska	Wiley Post/Will Rogers Memorial Airport	1,910

== See also ==
- List of airports in Alaska
