= Crabzilla hoax =

Internet hoax involving a giant crab image

Crabzilla is a 2014 internet hoax revolving around two digitally manipulated images that appear to feature a giant crab lurking off the coast of Whitstable, Kent. Introduced in 2013, the images were originally published on the local folklore art website Weird Whitstable, where they were presented as factual; however, they were later revealed to have been created by the website's owner, Quinton Winter. They quickly spread through British and international media outlets, prompting widespread speculation and viral attention. Sea-life experts, graphic designers, and fact-checking publications later identified the satellite image as edited, raising suspicion of complete falsification. The hoax's creator, Quinton Winter, confirmed its hoax status through an interview with Kent Online.

== History ==
The earliest known appearance of Crabzilla dates to 2013, on the local folklore website Weird Whitstable, where it was presented as a real aerial shot of the coast of Whitstable. The site, created by illustrator Quinton Winter, regularly published stories of fictional and exaggerated coastal creatures around the Whitstable area. The second image of Crabzilla was released on July 21 of the same year, depicting children playing on a dock above water, where a large crab is shown beneath them.

=== Virality and skepticism ===
In 2014, both images were picked up by British and international tabloids along with other outlets. The term "Crabzilla' was coined in news coverage. HuffPost parodically framed the image, presenting it as false. Journalist Samantha Payne covered it for International Business Times in a more sensational manner. The photograph soon spread rapidly across social media. Additionally, it was reportedly covered in series 48, episode 3 of the British television panel show Have I Got News For You. The renewed attention prompted Kent-based graphic designer Ashley Austen to question the image, stating that it could be 'quite easily recreated in Photoshop'. Sea-life expert, Dr. Verity Nye, discredited the image's validity, deeming it a hoax.

Finally, on October 16, 2014, Quinton Winter confirmed the hoax status of the image through an interview with Kent Online. He described the image as 'a bit of fun', mentioning it was not intended to achieve virality. The Australian Broadcasting Corporation linked the hoax's popularity to internet clickbait, criticizing the media's reportage of the aerial image.

== Explanation ==
According to The Independent, the aerial image was created by digitally expanding a shore crab and compositing it onto satellite imagery of Whitstable, taken from Bing Maps.

== See also ==
- -zilla, a suffix derived from Godzilla
