= Hogzilla =

Giant pig killed in 2004

Image of captured, dead Hogzilla with its hunter Chris Griffin.

Hogzilla (a portmanteau of hog and Godzilla) was a notably large male hybrid of wild hog and domestic pig that was shot and killed by Chris Griffin in Alapaha, Georgia, United States, within the boundaries of Ken Holyoak's fish farm and hunting reserve on June 17, 2004. It was alleged to measure 12 feet (3.7 m) in length and weigh over 1,000 pounds (450 kg). It was originally widely considered a hoax or urban legend.

The hybrid animal was of a monstrous size, reported to be 12 feet long from snout to tail, hence the lexical connection to the popular movie monster.

The animal's remains were exhumed in early 2005 and studied by forensic scientists for an episode of Explorer for the National Geographic Channel. In March 2005, these scientists confirmed that Hogzilla actually weighed 800 pounds (360 kg) and was between 6.9 feet (2.1 m) and 8.6 feet (2.6 m) long, diminishing the previous claim. DNA testing was performed, revealing that Hogzilla was a hybrid of a wild boar and a domestic pig (Hampshire breed). However, compared to most wild boars and domestics, Hogzilla was still an unusually large specimen. Hogzilla's tusks measured nearly 28 inches (71 cm) and 19 inches (48 cm).

== See also ==
- List of individual pigs
- Monster Pig
- -zilla
