= Atqasuk, Alaska =

City in Alaska, United States

Atqasuk
- City
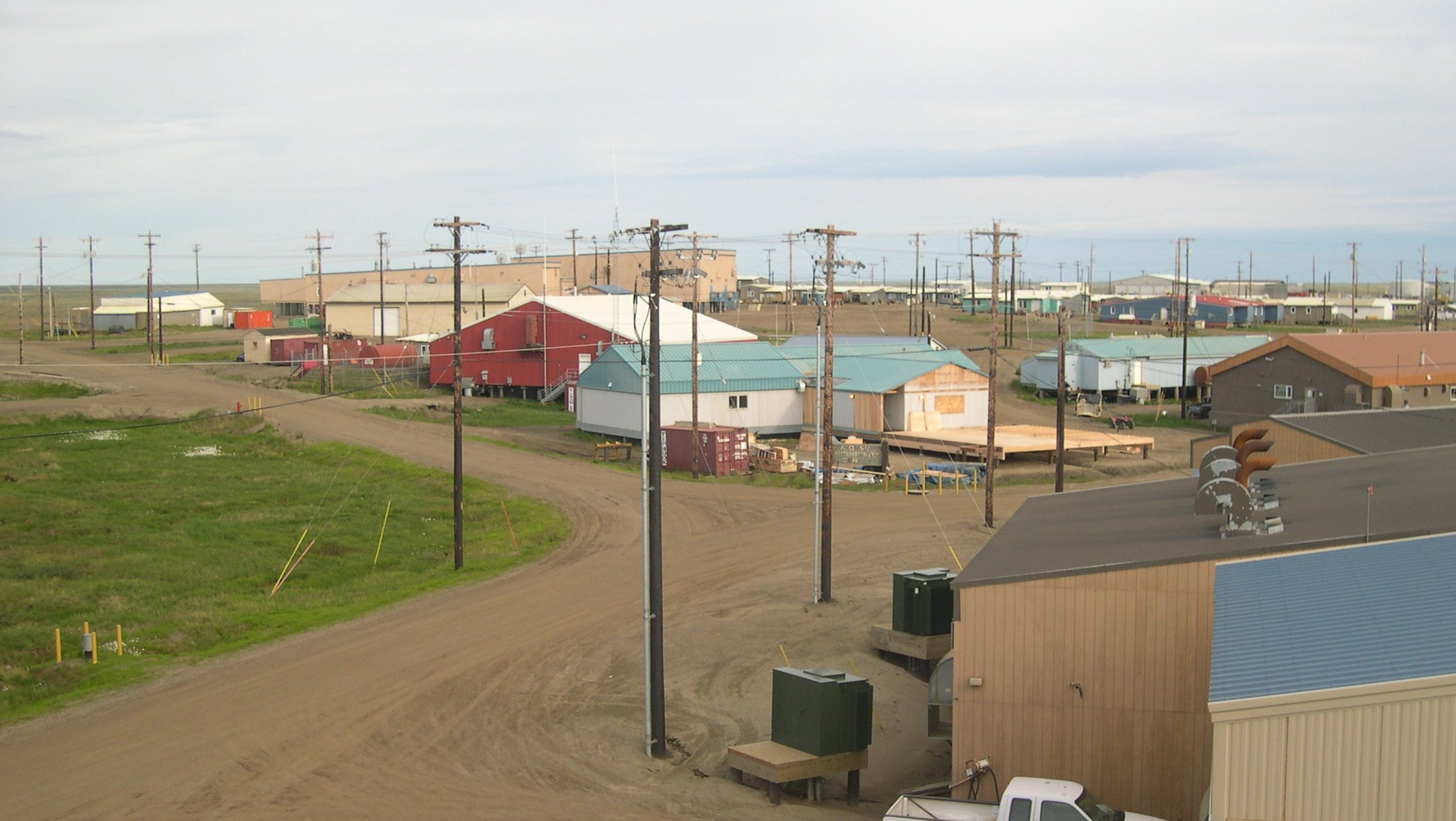
- Atqasuk in the summer

- Location in Alaska
- Coordinates: 70°28′40″N 157°25′05″W
- Country: United States
- State: Alaska
- Borough: North Slope
- Incorporated: October 10, 1982

Government
  - Mayor: Douglas Whiteman
  - State senator: Donny Olson (D)
  - State rep.: Robyn Burke (D)

Area
  - Total: 42.73 sq mi (110.68 km^{2})
  - Land: 39.12 sq mi (101.32 km^{2})
  - Water: 3.62 sq mi (9.37 km^{2})
- Elevation: 56 ft (17 m)

Population (2020)
  - Total: 276
  - Density: 7.0/sq mi (2.72/km^{2})
- Time zone: UTC-9 (Alaska (AKST))
  - Summer (DST): UTC-8 (AKDT)
- ZIP code: 99791
- Area code: 907
- FIPS code: 02-04500
- GNIS feature ID: 1406178, 2419360

Atqasuk (English: /ˈætkəˌsuk/; Iñupiaq: [ɐtqɐsuk]) is a small Iñupiat city in the North Slope Borough, Alaska, United States. The population was 276 at the 2020 census and 233 at the 2010 census. The name of the city means “downslope” in the Iñupiaq language. The city is governed by the Native Village of Atqasuk, and maintains a predominantly subsistence-based lifestyle centered on hunting, fishing, and gathering.

== History ==
The area surrounding Atqasuk has been used by the Iñupiat people for generations as a site for hunting and fishing. During World War II, the U.S. military operated a small coal mining site near the community to supply fuel to facilities in Utqiaġvik. The modern settlement of Atqasuk was reestablished in the 1970s when families returned from Utqiaġvik to resettle ancestral lands. The community is formally recognized as the Native Village of Atqasuk (Atkasook) under the Alaska Native Claims Settlement Act and operates under a tribal government.

== Geography ==
Atqasuk is located approximately 60 miles (97 kilometers) south of Utqiaġvik, at 70°28′40″N 157°25′05″W (70.477663, -157.418056), along the Meade River.

According to the United States Census Bureau, the city has a total area of 42.3 square miles (110 km^{2}), of which 38.9 square miles (101 km^{2}) is land and 3.5 square miles (9.1 km^{2}) (8.22%) is water.

=== Climate ===
Atqasuk has a cold and dry subarctic climate (Köppen Dfc) closely bordering on a tundra climate (Köppen ET).

Atqasuk is situated on the Arctic coastal plain of northern Alaska within a tundra landscape characterized by low relief, continuous permafrost, and extensive wetlands. The Meade River runs through the community, providing access to fishing and transportation routes. The region experiences an Arctic maritime climate, with long, dark winters and short, cool summers. Average annual temperatures remain below freezing for most of the year, and permafrost conditions significantly influence infrastructure, building foundations, and water management systems. Seasonal thawing of the active layer can result in flooding and the formation of thermokarst features, which affect roads, housing, and other community structures.

Climate data for Atqasuk (1991–2020)
Month	Jan	Feb	Mar	Apr	May	Jun	Jul	Aug	Sep	Oct	Nov	Dec	Year
Mean daily maximum °F (°C)	−7 (−22)	−5 (−21)	−3 (−19)	12 (−11)	31 (−1)	52 (11)	60 (16)	53 (12)	42 (6)	27 (−3)	11 (−12)	−1 (−18)	22.1 (−5.5)
Daily mean °F (°C)	−14 (−26)	−12 (−24)	−10.5 (−23.6)	4 (−16)	25.5 (−3.6)	43.5 (6.4)	51.5 (10.8)	45.5 (7.5)	36.5 (2.5)	22 (−6)	4.5 (−15.3)	−8 (−22)	15.7 (−9.1)
Mean daily minimum °F (°C)	−21 (−29)	−19 (−28)	−18 (−28)	−4 (−20)	20 (−7)	35 (2)	43 (6)	38 (3)	31 (−1)	17 (−8)	−2 (−19)	−15 (−26)	9 (−13)
Average precipitation inches (mm)	0.13 (3.3)	0.00 (0.00)	0.05 (1.3)	0.09 (2.3)	0.33 (8.4)	0.71 (18)	1.72 (44)	1.59 (40)	0.70 (18)	0.14 (3.6)	0.07 (1.8)	0.10 (2.5)	5.63 (143.2)

== Demographics ==
Historical population
Census	Pop.	Note	%±
1940	78		—
1950	49		−37.2%
1960	30		−38.8%
1980	107		—
1990	216		101.9%
2000	228		5.6%
2010	233		2.2%
2020	276		18.5%
U.S. Decennial Census

Atqasuk first appeared on the 1940 U.S. Census as the unincorporated village of "Meade River." It reported on the 1950 census as "Tikikluk." In 1960, it returned again as Meade River. It did not appear on the 1970 census. It next reported on the 1980 U.S. Census as "Atkasook", and was made a census designated place (CDP). It formally incorporated in 1982 as Atqasuk.

=== 2020 census ===
As of the 2020 census, Atqasuk had a population of 276. The median age was 25.1 years. 37.3% of residents were under the age of 18 and 4.7% of residents were 65 years of age or older. For every 100 females there were 114.0 males, and for every 100 females age 18 and over there were 113.6 males age 18 and over.

0.0% of residents lived in urban areas, while 100.0% lived in rural areas.

There were 72 households in Atqasuk, of which 59.7% had children under the age of 18 living in them. Of all households, 22.2% were married-couple households, 25.0% were households with a male householder and no spouse or partner present, and 29.2% were households with a female householder and no spouse or partner present. About 22.2% of all households were made up of individuals and 4.2% had someone living alone who was 65 years of age or older.

There were 79 housing units, of which 8.9% were vacant. The homeowner vacancy rate was 0.0% and the rental vacancy rate was 0.0%.

Racial composition as of the 2020 census
Race	Number	Percent
White	21	7.6%
Black or African American	1	0.4%
American Indian and Alaska Native	240	87.0%
Asian	0	0.0%
Native Hawaiian and Other Pacific Islander	0	0.0%
Some other race	0	0.0%
Two or more races	14	5.1%
Hispanic or Latino (of any race)	1	0.4%

=== 2010 census ===
As of the 2010 United States census, there were 233 people living in the city. The racial makeup of the city was 92.3% Native American, 6.9% White and 0.9% from two or more races.

=== 2000 census ===
As of the census of 2000, there were 228 people, 55 households, and 44 families living in the city. The population density was 5.9 people per square mile (2.3 people/km^{2}). There were 60 housing units at an average density of 1.5 units per square mile (0.58 units/km^{2}). The racial makeup of the city was 94.30% Native Alaskan, 4.82% White, 0.44% Asian, and 0.44% from two or more races.

There were 55 households, out of which 50.9% had children under the age of 18 living with them, 47.3% were married couples living together, 21.8% had a female householder with no husband present, and 18.2% were non-families. 16.4% of all households were made up of individuals, and none had someone living alone who was 65 years of age or older. The average household size was 4.15 and the average family size was 4.49.

The age distribution of the city's population in shows 40.4% under the age of 18, 8.8% from 18 to 24, 29.8% from 25 to 44, 15.4% from 45 to 64, and 5.7% who were 65 years of age or older. The median age was 26 years. For every 100 females, there were 113.1 males. For every 100 females age 18 and over, there were 123.0 males.

The median income for a household in the city was $66,607, and the median income for a family was $53,750. Males had a median income of $41,875 versus $27,500 for females. The per capita income for the city was $14,732. About 25.0% of families and 15.6% of the population were below the poverty line, including 4.9% of those under the age of eighteen and 57.1% of those 65 or over.

== Economy and infrastructure ==
The economy of Atqasuk relies primarily on subsistence harvesting and local employment in municipal, tribal, and educational services. Basic utilities, including water and wastewater systems, are operated by the North Slope Borough. Drinking water is delivered to homes, and wastewater is removed by truck, as permafrost conditions limit the use of underground piping systems. Supplies and fuel are transported seasonally by barge or air, as Atqasuk is not connected to the Alaska road system. Renewable energy assessments and energy audits have been conducted to improve efficiency and reduce dependence on imported fuel.

=== Education ===
Educational services in Atqasuk are provided by the North Slope Borough School District through Meade River School, which serves students from kindergarten through grade 12. The community also contains a local health clinic, public safety office, and community center that hosts municipal and cultural activities. Transportation infrastructure includes a gravel airstrip that provides passenger and cargo service to Utqiaġvik and other North Slope communities.

=== Health ===
Health services in Atqasuk are provided through a combination of local, regional, and tribal programs that support the medical and public health needs of residents in this remote Arctic community. The village maintains a local health clinic that operates under the North Slope Borough Health Department and the Arctic Slope Native Association (ASNA), providing primary care, emergency response, and public health outreach on a limited basis. More advanced medical services are accessed through regional facilities in Utqiaġvik, approximately 60 miles (97 kilometers) to the north, which houses the Samuel Simmonds Memorial Hospital, the primary healthcare provider for the North Slope region.

Due to Atqasuk's isolation and lack of road access, medical transportation is primarily conducted by small aircraft, and weather conditions frequently influence the availability of emergency evacuation services. Preventive healthcare efforts focus on addressing chronic conditions common in rural Alaska, such as respiratory illnesses, cardiovascular disease, and diabetes, along with environmental health concerns related to water quality and permafrost-related infrastructure.

Public health and safety initiatives emphasize wellness education, vaccination programs, and community-based emergency preparedness. The village also participates in broader regional health programs coordinated by the North Slope Borough and tribal organizations to improve healthcare accessibility and environmental health monitoring across the Arctic coastal plain.

=== Research and environmental studies ===
Atqasuk is part of a long-term network of Arctic research sites used to study permafrost, hydrology, and climate change. The area supports monitoring projects on soil temperature, carbon cycling, and vegetation change, coordinated by universities and federal agencies in collaboration with the North Slope Borough and local communities. These research efforts contribute to broader understanding of Arctic environmental dynamics and community-level climate adaptation.

=== Transportation ===
Atqasuk has one airport, Atqasuk Edward Burnell Sr. Memorial Airport, that is uncontrolled and has a single 4,370-by-90-foot (1,332 by 27 m) runway at an elevation of 96 feet (29 m).
