= Native Village of Atqasuk =

Federally recognized Alaska Native tribe

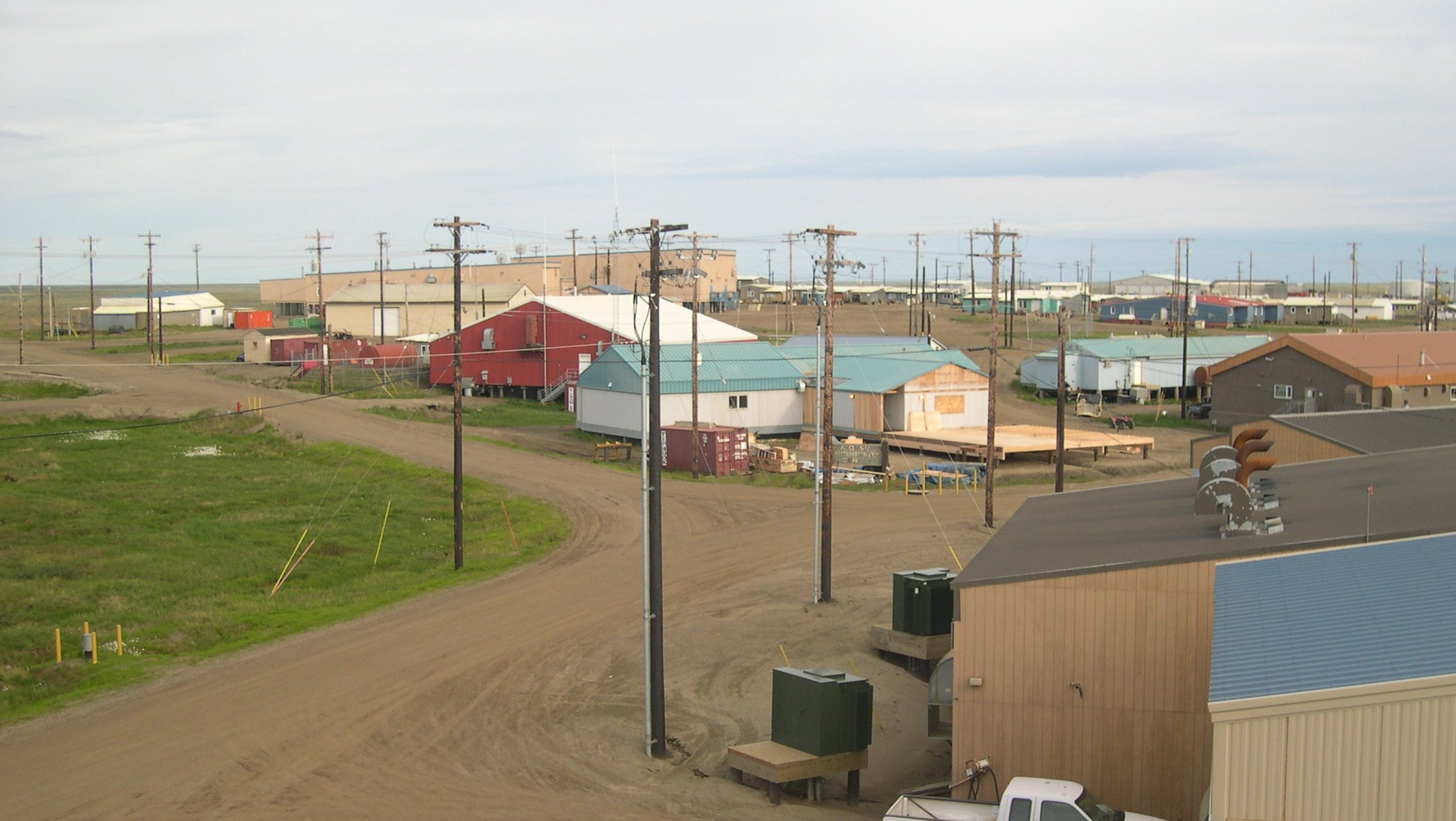
- People: Iñupiat
- Headquarters: Atqasuk, Alaska, US

Government
- Chief: Michelle Bordeaux

Tribal Council
- Atqasuk Tribal Council

The Native Village of Atqasuk is a federally recognized Iñupiat Alaska Native tribal entity.

== About ==
Native Village of Atqasuk is headquartered in the city of Atqasuk in the North Slope Borough of Alaska. As of 2005, the tribe had 254 enrolled citizens.

== See also ==
- List of Alaska Native tribal entities
