= Meade River =

River in the U.S. state of Alaska

- Location of the mouth of the Meade River in Alaska
- Native name: Kuulugruaq (Inupiaq)

Location
- Country: United States
- State: Alaska
- Borough: North Slope

Physical characteristics
- Source: Kulugra Ridge
  - location: National Petroleum Reserve–Alaska
  - coordinates: 69°21′42″N 158°42′22″W
  - elevation: 891 ft (272 m)
- Mouth: Admiralty Bay
  - location: Beaufort Sea
  - coordinates: 70°54′12″N 155°57′27″W
  - elevation: 0 ft (0 m)
- Basin size: 1,790 sq mi (4,600 km^{2}) at Atqasuk, Alaska
- Discharge
  - location: Atqasuk, Alaska
  - average: 702 cu ft/s (19.9 m^{3}/s)
  - maximum: 55,400 cu ft/s (1,570 m^{3}/s)

The Meade River (Iñupiaq: Kuulugruaq) is a river in the North Slope region of the U.S. state of Alaska, beginning near Kulugra Ridge in the National Petroleum Reserve–Alaska and flowing generally north past Atqasuk to Admiralty Bay, where it empties into the southern end of the Dease Inlet on the Beaufort Sea.

== See also ==
- List of rivers of Alaska
