= Snowzilla =

Snowzilla may refer to:

- Snowmageddon, Snowpocalypse, and Snowzilla, common nicknames for various winter storms in North America and the United Kingdom, including:
  - January 2016 United States blizzard
  - February 9–10, 2010 North American blizzard
- Snowzilla (snowman), a giant snowman built annually in Anchorage, Alaska
- Snowzilla, a jet-powered snow blower used on the Massachusetts Bay Transportation Authority's Mattapan Line
