= Monster Pig =

2007 media controversy

Jamison Stone poses with the slain pig. The authenticity of the photo has been disputed.

Monster Pig was the subject of a controversial 2007 story that initially ran in the news media as a report (and a series of accompanying photographs) of an 11-year-old boy shooting a massive feral pig. The pig was claimed to have been shot during a hunt on May 3, 2007, by an 11-year-old boy named Jamison Stone. The location of the shooting was the Lost Creek Plantation, a commercial hunting preserve outside Anniston, Alabama, US. According to the hunters (there were no independent witnesses), the pig weighed 1,051 pounds (477 kg) and measured 9 feet 4 inches (2.84 m) in length.

The story quickly ran into veracity problems with news organizations backing off on their coverage when inconsistencies in the story were revealed, including NBC, who canceled their interview with the Stone family when they suspected the story was a hoax. It was pointed out right away that the photographs of the pig released to the media seemed to be purposely posed and doctored to exaggerate scale. It was later also revealed that the "giant feral hog" was actually a large domestic farm-raised pig named "Fred" that had been purchased by the hunting preserve's owner four days before the hunt in an apparent publicity stunt. A scheduled 2008 grand jury investigation of the event, based on charges of animal cruelty, was later canceled.

== Claim ==
The story, as told by the Stones to the news media, was that on May 3, 2007, 11-year-old Jamison Stone was hunting a huge feral hog with his father Mike Stone along with Keith O'Neal and Charles Williams, owners of Southeastern Trophy Hunters, on a 2,500-acre (1,000 ha) farm outside of Anniston, Alabama. Jamison told the media they were invited there by a "friend" who told them about a "big hog he had that was tearing up land". The Stones and the other hunters tracked/chased the hog through the woods for over 3 hours and Jamison Stone fired 16 shots with a .50 caliber Smith & Wesson Model 500 revolver equipped with red dot sight shooting 350-grain Hornady cartridges, hitting it nine times before he killed it with a head shot. They hauled the pig by truck to the Clay County Farmers Exchange in Lineville where they used a scale, finding out it weighed 1,050 pounds (480 kg). The hunters also claimed that the pig was 9 feet 4 inches (2.84 m) in length from the tip of its snout to the base of its tail. However, this has not been corroborated by any source.

== Controversies ==
It was soon revealed that the hunt took place in a 150-acre (60 ha) low fence enclosure within the larger 2,500-acre (1,010 ha) commercial hunting preserve called Lost Creek Plantation. A later claim said that Mr Stone had paid $1,500 to Eddy Borden, the owner of Lost Creek Plantation, so that his son could shoot a trophy wild hog in the commercial hunting preserve. Other facts were revealed expanding the controversy around this story.

=== Images ===
Several days after the story broke, suspicion mounted over the authenticity of the photographic evidence. Retired New York University physicist Dr. Richard Brandt used perspective geometry to demonstrate that either the pig was 15 feet (4.6 m) long (far bigger than claimed) or the boy in the photo was standing several meters behind the pig, using forced perspective to create the optical illusion that the animal was larger than its actual size. Others claim the photographs were digitally altered.

An image of Jamison Stone with the slain pig, one that stinkyjournalism.org claims they archived from the Stone owned website MonsterPig.com

It has been shown that most of the pictures that were distributed to the media were altered through the use of digital enhancement and perspective to make the pig look much larger than it really was. There were also claims that other photographs (since removed) from Monsterpig.com (a website owned by the Stone family) showed a more normal size and scale for the pig.

Despite the evidence that the images were altered or produced by trick photography, a message was kept on the Stone family website denying that the images had been modified to make the pig look larger than it was.

The Associated Press (AP) continues to keep the monster pig image in their archives with no disclosure of the forced perspective trick; the AP's archive caption presents it as if it is a legitimate photograph, stating: "In this photo released by Melynne Stone, Jamison Stone, 11, poses with a wild pig he killed near Delta, Ala., May 3, 2007. Stone's father says the hog weighed a staggering 1,051 pounds (477 kg) and measured 9 feet 4 inches (2.84 m) from the tip of its snout to the base of its tail. If claims of the animal's size are true, it would be larger than Hogzilla, the huge hog killed in Georgia in 2004."

=== Domestic versus feral ===
Shortly after the story hit the press, the truth about the origins of the pig was revealed. "Monster Pig" was a domestic hog named "Fred", partly of the Duroc breed, and until four days earlier had lived on a nearby farm. The farm's owners, Rhonda and Phil Blissitt, stated that the pig loved to play with their grandchildren and his favorite treat was canned sweet potatoes. Previous stories reported that the pig had escaped domestication; however, the Blissits in fact sold the pet pig to the game preserve. According to The Anniston Star report, the Blissitts had raised him from a piglet as a pet, but were selling all of the pigs on their farm, and came forward as they were concerned that Fred was being passed off as a wild pig.

=== Weight verification ===
As reported by the Associated Press, the problem with the claimed weight of 1,051 pounds (477 kg) was that, according to Jeff Kinder (the man who gave the keys to the scale to the plantation's owner), the scale at the Clay County Coop only weighs in 10-pound (4.5 kg) increments. Thus, the number 1051 is not a possible reading from that scale, making the whole measurement, on its face, incorrect or in part an estimate. When asked about this, the father said he had misunderstood the reading on the scale and believed the true measurement had been 1,060 pounds (480 kg).

== Subsequent allegations ==
Later news reports brought forward allegations that the entire story was the result of a canned hunt scheme cooked up by Eddy Borden, the owner of Lost Creek Plantation, and Keith O'Neal of Southeastern Trophy Hunters, to build up business for the then four-months-old Lost Creek hunting plantation, trying to create their own news event along the lines of the 2004 "Hogzilla" event. Borden purchased "Fred" from the Blissitts for $250, released him into the enclosure, and passed him off as a wild hog to the unsuspecting Stones. It was also reported that they were told by a local TV station that it would only be a news worthy story if the boy shot the pig.

Stinkyjournalism.org also archived this notice from the Southeastern Trophy Hunters website:

LCP is offering a once in a lifetime opportunity to harvest a truly giant boar...Eddy Borden, owner and operator of LCP, has just trapped another boar... this monster will weigh at least a thousand ponds – that is a half ton of pork! The beast is now roaming the worlds of Lost Creek Plantation. We are offering this hunt on a no kill = a no pay basis. The total cost of this hunt is fifteen hundred dollars and includes everything but the processing of the meat. The boar is jet black and has huge tusks. Keith O' Neal and Chris Williams will be on hand to help guide and video this hunt. if you ever wanted to take an animal of this magnitude, now is your chance! this beast will not last long, so if you're interested call us ASAP. Yours in hunting/fishing, Keith O' Neal Southeastern Trophy Hunters, April 28, 2007.

January 29, 2008, saw reports that an Alabama grand jury was investigating Keith O'Neal, Charles Williams, and Lost Creek Plantation owner Eddy Borden, over the killing of the pig on grounds that since there was no "kill shot" delivered by Jamison Stone, it was animal cruelty to allow a pig to be chased and continually shot by an 11-year old until it bled out when there were experienced marksmen present who could have dispatched it. Clay County District Attorney Fred Thompson later cancelled the grand jury without a public explanation, and the case was not reviewed within the one-year statute of limitations.

== See also ==
- List of individual pigs
