= Southern Southeast Regional Aquaculture Association =

- Southern Southeast Regional Aquaculture Association, Inc.
- Abbreviation: SSRAA
- Pronunciation: "Sarah"
- Formation: 1976; 50 years ago
- Type: Nonprofit
- Tax ID no.: 92-0057726
- Legal status: 501(c)(3)
- Headquarters: Ketchikan, Alaska
- Board President: Tom Fisher
- Website: https://ssraa.org/

The Southern Southeast Regional Aquaculture Association or SSRAA for short, is a non-profit company located out of Alaska. Their mission is "to enhance and rehabilitate salmon production in southern Southeast Alaska to the optimum social and economic benefit of salmon users". They have a total of four salmon hatcheries that grow salmon to age and then release them into the wild.

== History ==
In the early 1970s Alaska's commercial salmon industry was at a point of collapse because of a decline in abundance of salmon. The fishing industry worked in part with the state of Alaska to draft legislation that would allow the formation of Regional Aquaculture Associations. The associations would support their infrastructure by receiving payments from fisherman that caught and harvested fish in the association's fishing districts. The Southern Southeast Regional Aquaculture Association was one of five associations incorporated in 1976. The SSRAA first began operations in 1978.

== Hatcheries ==
The SSRAA operates seven hatcheries and multiple remote release sites in southern Southeast Alaska. They currently operate hatcheries at Whitman Lake, Deer Mountain, Neets Bay, Burnett Inlet, Klawock River, Port Saint Nicholas, and Crystal Lake. Each location has a salmon enhancement program, which are designed to supplement the wild salmon population. The goal of the SSRAA is not to replace the fish, but to increase the amount of wild fish. The SSRAA currently include all species of pacific salmon apart from the pink & sockeye salmon. Their primary producer is the Chum salmon, of which they release about 200 million into the wild annually.

=== Whitman Lake ===
Whitman Lake was the first facility of the SSRAA, and has been operational since 1978. The hatchery is located in the George Inlet, which is approximately nine point three miles (15 km) to the south of the city of Ketchikan, Alaska. Whitman Lake produces chinook, coho, and chum salmon. Whitman Lake is a critical site for the SSRAA because they are a big supplier of salmon eggs for other hatcheries, with over 40 million chum salmon eggs passing through Whitman Lake annually.

=== Neets Bay ===
Neets Bay started as a place to serve as a release point for Whitman Lake. In the early 1980s a hatchery was built in Neets Bay. The two hatcheries at Whitman and Neets work together to utilize all the available space and water. Neets Hatchery is located at the head of Neets Bay which is approximately 40 miles away from Ketchikan, Alaska. The hatchery is not accessible by road, and must be reached either by air or by sea. From around late July to early September, a flight charter company flies around 300 to 400 tourists to Neets Bay each day. The tourists visit to observe the black bears that lounge around a small creek behind the hatchery.

=== Burnett Inlet ===
The facility at Burnett Inlet was first constructed by Alaska Aquaculture Company. The original goal of the facility was to exclusively produce chum salmon. Alaska aquaculture eventually went into bankruptcy in the mid-1990s. The state of Alaska offered the facility at Burnett to the SSRAA. In 1995 the SSRAA took over operations at Burnett.

=== Crystal Lake ===
Crystal Lake is operated by the SSRAA in conjunction with the Alaska Department of Fish and Game. The hatchery at Crystal Lake is one of the oldest operating hatcheries since it began operations in 1973 as an ADF&G facility. Crystal Lake is about eighteen miles to the south of Petersburg. The hatchery got its name from Crystal Lake which is the power source for Petersburg's hydroelectric power plant.

=== Klawock River Hatchery ===
SSRAA took over operations of the Klawock River Hatchery from the Prince of Wales Hatchery Association in 2016. This is a State owned hatchery located on Klawock Heenya land is leased to the SSRAA. SSRAA produces coho from this facility releasing 4.5 million annually.

=== Port Saint Nicholas Hatchery ===
SSRAA leases a hatchery from the City of Craig Alaska to raise chinook for release within Port Saint Nicholas.

=== Deer Mountain Hatchery ===
The Deer Mountain Hatchery has a long history of operation within the coastal community of Ketchikan, Alaska. Started in the 1950s by local sportsmen, the hatchery was eventually owned by the City of Ketchikan and operated by the State of Alaska. Prior to SSRAA operating the hatchery the Ketchikan Indian Community corporation ran the facility after the State ended operations. Currently the SSRAA produces chinook some of which are released into Ketchikan Creek and the remainder released at a remote release site in Carroll Inlet.

== Production ==
The state of Alaska has reported that the SSRAA has had a significant economic impact on fishing industry of Southeast Alaska. Between 2001 and 2007, 81.3 million pounds of SSRAA-produced salmon was harvested. The fish released by the SSRAA had also made an impact on the sportfishing industry. Without the fish that are released into the wild by the SSRAA, there would most likely be much less sportfishing operations. In 2007 alone, the SSRAA created 420 jobs and $11.5 million in labor income. The bulk of these jobs and labor income occur in Ketchikan, but they also occur in other parts of Southeast Alaska.
