= Fair chase =

Hunting term

Fair chase is a term used by hunters to describe an ethical approach to hunting big game animals. North America's oldest wildlife conservation group, the Boone and Crockett Club, defines "fair chase" as requiring the targeted game animal to be wild and free-ranging. "Wild" refers to an animal that is naturally bred and lives freely in nature. "Free-ranging" means an animal that is not restrained by traps or artificial barriers, so it has a fair chance of successfully escaping from the hunt.

Fair chase has been the honor code of North American hunters for over a century and the principle underlying many hunting laws, and is taught to new hunters in hunter certification courses.

Fair Chase is also a registered trademark of the Boone and Crockett Club.

== History ==
The concept and the popularization of the term "fair chase" is credited to Theodore Roosevelt and perpetuated by the Boone and Crockett Club, a conservation organization of Roosevelt's creation.

=== European aristocratic roots ===
Ethics, or a code of conduct, in hunting first emerged centuries ago among European hunters who were primarily the wealthy landowners and royalty. While the commoner hunted to stay alive, the aristocrat hunted for sport, and it was this sporting approach that separated the two. These ethics did not transfer to the majority of immigrants that settled in the New World. Basic human survival and commercial enterprises often overlooked any hunting ethics. After two hundred years of unregulated hunting by recreational and commercial market hunters, the negative effects were severe. By the end of this "era of extermination", wildlife and especially big game populations were in drastic condition. Some species had already been lost to extinction, many others were on the edge of it.

In the early part of the 20th century, a sense of pride and accomplishment began to emerge among sportsmen that came with their newly accepted responsibility to conserve. Doing right by the game being hunted meant working with conservation and population recovery efforts, including the creation of the National Wildlife Refuge System. As for the hunt itself, using restraint shifted the emphasis of measuring success from the quantity of game taken to the quality of the chase. The hunting experience became more important than the number killed, and success was now more memorable because the hunting experience became sustainable in the long term.

=== Development and definition ===
The earliest recorded North American usage of the term "fair chase" is in the fifth article of the Boone and Crockett Club constitution, adopted in February 1888. At this time in American history, there were no laws governing the taking of game for food or for sport. Water-killing deer (driving deer with hounds or pushers into lakes where hunters waited in boats to either shoot, club, or cut the throats of deer) was a widespread practice, especially in the Adirondack Mountains.

Article X of the club's constitution declared that the killing of game while swimming was an "offense" for which a member may be suspended or expelled from the club. Later writings by club members Roosevelt, George Bird Grinnell, and Aldo Leopold articulated the term "fair chase" to the public through books and magazine articles. Most notable of these were the club's Acorn book series on hunting (1893 – 1933), Leopold's Sand County Almanac, and Grinnell's Forest and Stream magazine (now Field & Stream).

In 1893, Roosevelt wrote about hunting and fair chase in his book titled The Wilderness Hunter.

=== Theodore Roosevelt ===
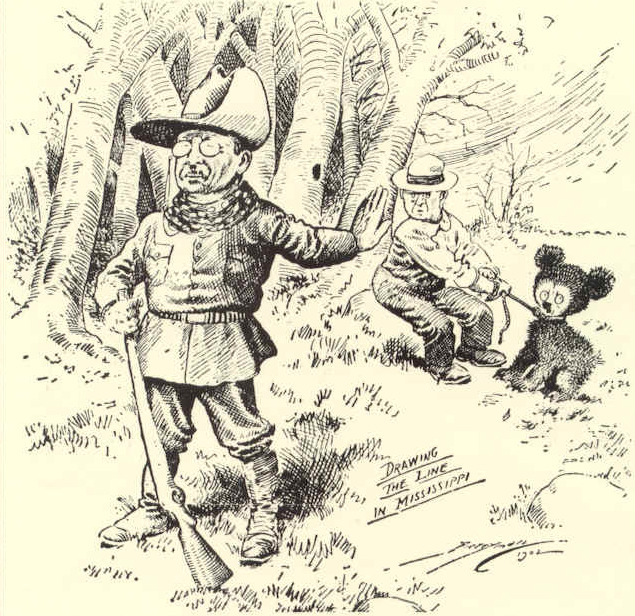
Clifford Berryman's cartoon

The history of the teddy bear has a noteworthy role in the modern history of the fair chase principle. During his presidency in 1902, Theodore Roosevelt was in Mississippi to settle a border dispute. His hosts knew Roosevelt was an avid hunter and arranged for a black bear hunt for the president. In the thick brush swamps of Mississippi it was a common practice of the day to hunt bears with hounds. Out of concern for the president's safety, the guides insisted that he stay in camp until a bear was brought to bay by the hounds, and subsequently a small bear was caught and tied to a tree. When Roosevelt arrived at the scene he refused to shoot the defenseless animal.

Being omitted from the chase was unsettling to Roosevelt, who prided himself in living the hardy life of an outdoorsman—the harder the hunt the better—and he did not earn this bear though a fair pursuit. Political cartoonist Clifford Berryman immediately drew a cartoon depicting Roosevelt refusing to shoot the restrained bear. The story made national headlines and a shopkeeper, Morris Michtom in Brooklyn, New York, had his wife sew a stuffed bear to sell in his store. He wrote Roosevelt asking permission to call the child's toy "Teddy's Bear", and he consented.

== Fair chase today ==
When in the field, the initial question for every fair chase hunter is whether the animal has a reasonable opportunity to elude the hunter. If the animal does not, the hunt can never be "fair chase". For example, a fair chase hunter does not shoot an animal hampered by deep snow or entangled in a barbed-wire fence.

There are also laws that regulate hunting. Ethical, fair chase hunting therefore begins with obeying game laws. A fair chase hunter must acquaint themselves with the laws that govern hunting, as they reflect considerations for safety, the sustainable use of the wildlife resources, and the minimum level of conduct that the public will tolerate in a particular state, province, region, or country. If something is illegal it cannot, by definition, be fair chase. On the other hand, just because something is legal does not make it fair chase.

There are certain aspects of fair chase hunting that extend beyond written laws. For example, shooting at a running deer is not illegal, nor are there any laws regarding shooting at extremely long ranges with a firearm or bow. To those who believe in the responsibility to kill quickly and cleanly, taking such risky shots would be unethical. A large part of the time-honored tradition of hunting has to do with the fact that sportsmen police themselves and others both within and beyond the rule of law.

"Canned shoots", also known as "canned hunting", may be legal in some North American states and provinces, but they are not representative of fair chase. Canned shoots involve the "pursuit" and killing of a big game animal kept in or released from captivity to be shot in an artificial hunting situation where a kill is virtually guaranteed.

When Internet hunting was introduced in 2005, allowing people to hunt over the Internet using remotely controlled guns, the practice was widely criticized by hunters as violating the principles of fair chase. A spokesperson of the National Rifle Association of America (NRA) stated, "The NRA has always maintained that fair chase, being in the field with your firearm or bow, is an important element of hunting tradition. Sitting at your desk in front of your computer, clicking at a mouse, has nothing to do with hunting."

The Pope and Young Club, a US-based organization that promotes bowhunting, declares that a fair chase shall not involve the taking of animals under the following conditions:

- Helplessly in a trap, struggling in deep snow, mud or water, or on ice.
- By "jacklighting" or blind-shining at night.
- By the use of any tranquilizers or poisons.
- While inside escape-proof fenced enclosures.
- From any powered vehicle or powerboat.
- By the use of any powered vehicle or powerboat for herding or driving animals, including use of aircraft to land alongside or to communicate with or direct a hunter on the ground.
- By the use of electronic devices for attracting, locating or pursuing game or guiding the hunter to such game, or by the use of a bow and arrow to which any electronic device is attached with the exception of lighted nocks and recording devices that cast no light towards the target and do not aid in rangefinding, sighting or shooting the bow.

== See also ==
- Turkey shoot
