= Ghostzilla =

Web browser

- Final release: 1.0.1-free-v1 / November 2002; 23 years ago
- Engine: Gecko
- Operating system: Microsoft Windows
- Available in: English
- Type: Web browser
- License: Mozilla Public License 1.1
- Website: www.ghostzilla.com

Ghostzilla is a discontinued open source web browser for Microsoft Windows based on Mozilla Application Suite 1.0.1. It ran the browser inside the window space of another application (e.g. in Microsoft Outlook), where the page was then made to look like the content in an email. When moving the cursor out of the window, the browser subsequently disappeared.

== History ==
Ghostzilla was originally launched as a shareware project priced at US$19.95. The project then became freeware and later open source. From May 2004 until January 2005, the project was removed from public view due to a copyright claim from Mozilla. It later returned with code directly derived from Mozilla's open source, excluding the core proprietary library used to create minimal pages and desaturated colors. It also came with warnings about the potential for misuse. In February 2007, the site was removed.

In March 2006, users of Firefox had the option of installing a free add-on called Ghostfox, which aimed to mimic Ghostzilla's behavior in Firefox, although from June 2010 this extension was no longer compatible with Firefox 3.5. An open source project, InstaBrowser, appeared in July 2007 mimicking Ghostzilla's ideas. By September 2009 this project was renamed Ninja Browser but was again short-lived.

== Features ==
Now you can hide what you're up to in full view of prying eyes as this web browser does its thing, mocking up your desktop furniture, files and trash bin while you're checking out the latest downloadable tunes.

— "Tech Heads", Daily Record (2002)

Ghostzilla is a browser which can be used directly from a CD or USB stick. Ghostzilla changes the layout of the web pages pending on the user's preferences as categorized into 6 different "stealth modes":

- As simple text (without any CSS, advertisement, or pop-ups).
- Images are hidden or grayed out.

Users can change their preferences so that the navigation bar turns off. If the cursor is placed outside the Ghostzilla window, Ghostzilla hides itself and can be viewed again by a mouse gesture.
