= Internet hunting =

Practice of hunting via remotely controlled firearms

Internet hunting was a moral panic in the 2000s that emerged in relation to the website Live-Shot.com, which allowed users to shoot animals using remotely-controlled firearms aimed via webcam. The panic resulted in legislation being passed across the United States of America despite Live-Shot.com being quickly closed down and no other operators entering the market.

Live-shot.com was launched in 2005 by Texas resident John Lockwood, who described it as a way to provide a hunting experience for disabled persons. According to the Humane Society of the United States, the operation consisted of "a fenced pen stocked with animals [where Lockwood] set up a tripod with a camera and a firearm".

Almost as soon as the operation was reported in the press, strong opposition to the concept developed among pro-gun and pro-hunting organizations, including the National Rifle Association of America and Safari Club International, as well as among animal rights and environmental groups, who argued that the majority of hunters did not consider the practice to be hunting, as it does not conform to the principles of a "fair chase".

By August 2008, forty U.S. states had enacted laws or regulations to ban internet hunting. These bans were supported by a Humane Society campaign. According to the Society, internet hunting is no longer being practiced. Critics say internet hunting never existed as a viable industry, with one commentator describing the legislation as "a testament to public alarm over internet threats and the gilded life of legislation that nobody opposes". A 2007 CBS News editorial claimed that "It turns out there weren't really Web "sites," ... More like one site, which was shut down almost soon as it opened."

Advocates see the legislation as a proactive measure to prevent the practice being developed in states or other countries where it is not prohibited.

== See also ==
- Remote weapon system
