= Koyukuk, Alaska =

Koyukuk Meneelghaadze’ T’oh
- City
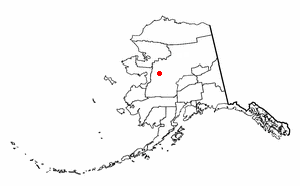
- Location of Koyukuk, Alaska
- Coordinates: 64°52′54″N 157°42′16″W
- Country: United States
- State: Alaska
- Census Area: Yukon-Koyukuk
- Incorporated: September 25, 1973

Government
  - Mayor: Agnes S. Dayton
  - State senator: Click Bishop (R)
  - State rep.: Mike Cronk (R)

Area
  - Total: 5.85 sq mi (15.15 km^{2})
  - Land: 5.75 sq mi (14.88 km^{2})
  - Water: 0.10 sq mi (0.27 km^{2})
- Elevation: 118 ft (36 m)

Population (2020)
  - Total: 98
  - Density: 17.1/sq mi (6.59/km^{2})
- Time zone: UTC-9 (Alaska (AKST))
  - Summer (DST): UTC-8 (AKDT)
- ZIP code: 99754
- Area code: 907
- FIPS code: 02-42050
- GNIS feature ID: 1404984

Koyukuk (/ˈkaɪjəkək/) (Koyukon: Meneelghaadze’ T’oh [məniːlʁæːt͡səʔ tʼoh]) is a city in Yukon-Koyukuk Census Area, Alaska, United States. As of the 2020 census, Koyukuk had a population of 98.

As of 2009, Koyukuk is one of a number of Alaskan communities threatened by erosion.

== History ==
The Koyukon Athabascans had seasonal camps and moved when the wild game migrated. There were 12 summer fish camps located on the Yukon River between the Koyukuk River and the Nowitna River. Trading between the Koyukon and Inupiat of the Kobuk River area has occurred before the arrival of Europeans.

After the Alaska Purchase, a United States military telegraph line was constructed along the north side of the Yukon River and Koyukuk became the site of a telegraph station. A trading post opened around 1880, just before the gold rush of 1884–85. Steamboats on the Yukon, which supplied gold prospectors ran before and after 1900 with 46 boats in operation on the river in the peak year of 1900. A measles epidemic and food shortages during 1900 reduced the population of the area by one-third.

The first school in Koyukuk was constructed in 1939. After the school was built, families began to live at Koyukuk year-round.

Koyukuk was used as an Iditarod checkpoint in 2015 when the race was rerouted from Fairbanks.

== Geography ==
Koyukuk is located at 64°52′54″N 157°42′16″W.

Koyukuk is located on the Yukon River near the mouth of the Koyukuk River. It is 50 km (31 mi) west of Galena. It is adjacent to the Koyukuk National Wildlife Refuge and the Innoko National Wildlife Refuge.

According to the United States Census Bureau, the city has a total area of 6.3 square miles (16 km^{2}), of which, 6.2 square miles (16 km^{2}) of it is land and 0.04 square miles (0.10 km^{2}) of it (0.64%) is water.

== Demographics ==
Historical population
Census	Pop.	Note	%±
1880	150		—
1890	174		16.0%
1910	121		—
1920	124		2.5%
1930	143		15.3%
1940	106		−25.9%
1950	79		−25.5%
1960	128		62.0%
1970	124		−3.1%
1980	98		−21.0%
1990	126		28.6%
2000	101		−19.8%
2010	96		−5.0%
2020	98		2.1%
U.S. Decennial Census

Koyukuk first appeared on the 1880 U.S. Census as the "Koyukuk Settlements", a Tinneh village. In 1890, it returned as "Koyukuk River Settlements." It did not appear again until 1910, then as Koyukuk. It formally incorporated in 1973.

=== 2020 census ===
As of the 2020 census, Koyukuk had a population of 98. The median age was 42.0 years. 22.4% of residents were under the age of 18 and 17.3% of residents were 65 years of age or older. For every 100 females there were 96.0 males, and for every 100 females age 18 and over there were 94.9 males age 18 and over.

0.0% of residents lived in urban areas, while 100.0% lived in rural areas.

There were 37 households in Koyukuk, of which 21.6% had children under the age of 18 living in them. Of all households, 29.7% were married-couple households, 27.0% were households with a male householder and no spouse or partner present, and 32.4% were households with a female householder and no spouse or partner present. About 37.8% of all households were made up of individuals and 13.5% had someone living alone who was 65 years of age or older.

There were 58 housing units, of which 36.2% were vacant. The homeowner vacancy rate was 0.0% and the rental vacancy rate was 0.0%.

Racial composition as of the 2020 census
Race	Number	Percent
White	0	0.0%
Black or African American	0	0.0%
American Indian and Alaska Native	98	100.0%
Asian	0	0.0%
Native Hawaiian and Other Pacific Islander	0	0.0%
Some other race	0	0.0%
Two or more races	0	0.0%
Hispanic or Latino (of any race)	1	1.0%

=== 2000 census ===
As of the census of 2000, there were 101 people, 39 households, and 24 families residing in the city. The population density was 16.2 inhabitants per square mile (6.3/km^{2}). There were 55 housing units at an average density of 8.8 per square mile (3.4/km^{2}). The racial makeup of the city was 8.91% White and 91.09% Native American.

There were 39 households, out of which 41.0% had children under the age of 18 living with them, 30.8% were married couples living together, 20.5% had a female householder with no husband present, and 35.9% were non-families. 35.9% of all households were made up of individuals, and 5.1% had someone living alone who was 65 years of age or older. The average household size was 2.59 and the average family size was 3.32.

In the city, the population was spread out, with 34.7% under the age of 18, 8.9% from 18 to 24, 36.6% from 25 to 44, 12.9% from 45 to 64, and 6.9% who were 65 years of age or older. The median age was 30 years. For every 100 females, there were 98.0 males. For every 100 females age 18 and over, there were 144.4 males.

The median income for a household in the city was $19,375, and the median income for a family was $31,250. Males had a median income of $30,000 versus $0 for females. The per capita income for the city was $11,341. There were 20.8% of families and 35.1% of the population living below the poverty line, including 53.8% of under eighteens and 33.3% of those over 64.

== Education ==
The Yukon–Koyukuk School District operates the Ella B. Vernetti School in Koyukuk.

== Notable person ==
George Attla (1933–2015), champion sprint dog musher, was born at a fishing camp outside of Koyukuk.
