= Koyukuk =

Koyukuk may refer to:

- Koyukuk, Alaska
- Koyukuk River
- Koyukuk National Wildlife Refuge
