= Prospect Creek, Alaska =

- CDP
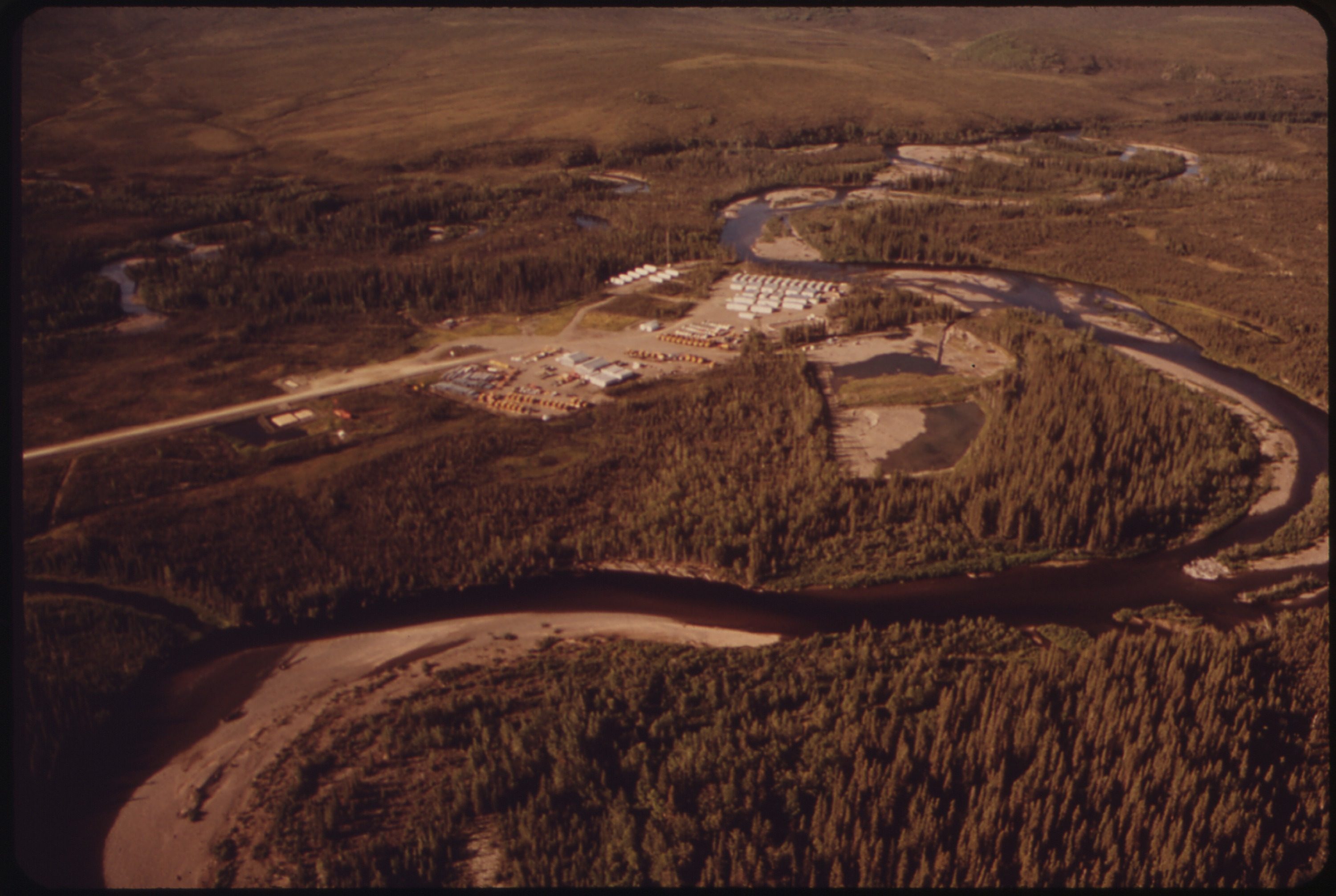
- Prospect Creek Camp in 1973

- Location within the state of Alaska
- Coordinates: 66°48′48″N 150°38′38″W
- Country: United States
- State: Alaska
- Census Area: Yukon-Koyukuk

Government
  - State senator: Click Bishop (R)
  - State rep.: Mike Cronk (R)

Area
  - Total: 48 sq mi (125 km^{2})
- Elevation: 1,014 ft (309 m)

Population (2000)
  - Total: Uninhabited
- Time zone: UTC-9 (Alaska (AKST))
  - Summer (DST): UTC-8 (AKDT)
- Area code: 907

Prospect Creek is a very small settlement approximately 180 miles (290 km) north of Fairbanks and 25 miles (40 km) southeast of Bettles, Alaska. Years ago it was home to numerous mining expeditions and the camp for the building of the Trans-Alaska Pipeline System (TAPS). Today, it is the location of Pump Station 5 (Jim River Station) of the TAPS. Prospect Creek is also home to the United States record for lowest temperature. On January 23, 1971, the record low temperature of −79.8 °F (−62.1 °C) (rounded to −80 °F (−62 °C)) was recorded. Wildlife can be found there even with its extreme changes in temperature; local fauna include anything from black and brown bears to bald eagles. The elevation of Prospect Creek is 643 feet (196 m) above sea level. Nearby Moore Creek is widely known for its gold and quartz mining and sits alongside Prospect Creek in Alaska’s Innoko Mining District (Moorecreek Mining Line, MML). The Innoko Mining District is famous for its findings of large quartz.

== History ==
A camp was set up near Prospect Creek in 1974 to help house some of the 27,000 people working on the construction of the TAPS and serve Pump Station 5. The camp contained little more than housing and washrooms. After the TAPS was completed in 1977, the camp was broken down and abandoned. There was little left afterward, other than Prospect Creek Airport and a large gravel pad.

In 1974, during the construction of the TAPS, there was a recorded wolf attack; however, the only resulting injury was some minor bruising with no apparent breaks in the skin. The wolf was killed and tested negative for rabies.

The camp was again used in 1992 as the first of the camp sites set up for the construction workers, engineers, and their families while they helped with the replacement of the bridges along the nearby Dalton Highway.

It is also utilized by campers and other short-term residents.

== Geography ==
Prospect Creek is situated 34 miles (55 km) north of the center of Alaska with coordinates: 66°48′48″N 150°38′38″W, just above the Arctic Circle. It is located right off the James Dalton Highway on the 135th mile (217th kilometre). Coldfoot is the nearest city and is located about 31 miles (50 km) northeast of Prospect Creek. The camp was situated near the start of the winter road to Bettles which begins just south of TAPS Pump Station 5 on the Dalton Highway.

According to the Bureau of Land Management, “Prospect Creek joins the Jim River within 3 miles (4.8 km) of the road crossing" and the Jim River flows south into the South Fork of the Koyukuk River.

Under the Köppen climate classification system, Prospect Creek has a subarctic climate. Prospect has recorded some of the coldest winters in U.S. history. There are currently no people living in this area. The camp has been abandoned since the early 1990s. Prospect Creek has a small airstrip, Prospect Creek Airport (IATA: PPC, ICAO: PAPR, FAA LID: PPC). Prospect Creek is a 220-mile drive North from Fairbanks via the Steese and Elliot Highways. Driving time is approximately 4–5 hrs on average in good weather and when road conditions are good. However, the drive can be very treacherous in the winter. There are commercial group tours into this area in the summer. Nearby and to the northwest, flows the Koyukuk, a major Alaskan river draining west into the Yukon.

Prospect Creek is located near two National Wildlife Reserves; Kanuti and Yukon Flats, and to the Southeast of the Gates of the Arctic National Park. The Prospect Creek area in itself is somewhat flat, but its surroundings are undulating and green, which is very typical of a boreal forest. Due to a very peculiar setting mixing extreme cold and an irregular massif there are occurrences of tungsten minerals, and also "bismuth is reported to have been found in a quartz vein on Prospect Creek." Despite this wealth of natural resources, no company has yet taken advantage of them due to the remote location.

=== Climate ===
Under the Köppen climate classification system, Prospect Creek has a subarctic climate. Prospect Creek has received some of the coldest winters in U.S. history. Prospect Creek was declared the coldest place in the United States at −79.8 °F (−62.1 °C) on January 23, 1971, with an average temperature of 20.4 °F (−6.4 °C). The North American record of −93.3 °F (−69.6 °C) was recorded in Greenland on December 22, 1991.

Highest Temperature: 87 °F (31 °C) on August 1, 1977

Warmest Minimum: 61 °F (16 °C) on July 14, 1975

Coldest Maximum: −64 °F (−53 °C) on January 23, 1971

Lowest Temperature: −80 °F (−62 °C) on January 23, 1971

Highest Daily Precipitation: 2.06 inches (52 mm) on July 24, 1977

Wettest Month: 5.25 inches (133 mm) in June 1974

Wettest Year: 14.74 inches (374 mm) in 1976

Driest Year: 9.93 inches (252 mm) in 1979

Highest Daily Snowfall: 10.0 inches (25 cm) on November 10, 1978

Snowiest Month: 45.4 inches (115 cm) in November 1978

Snowiest Year: 162.6 inches (413 cm) in 1978

Earliest Snowfall: September 4, 1976 (trace)

Latest Snowfall: June 3, 1974 (trace)

Deepest Snowpack: 60 inches (150 cm) February 5–6, 1971 and the 10th of the same year

A weather station was operated between 1970 and 1980 during the construction of the Alaska Pipeline, and after a long gap, temperature observations resumed in 2015. Intermittent snow and precip totals were also taken around 2001.

Climate data for Prospect Creek Camp, Alaska (1970–2001)
Month	Jan	Feb	Mar	Apr	May	Jun	Jul	Aug	Sep	Oct	Nov	Dec	Year
Record high °F (°C)	35 (2)	39 (4)	37 (3)	56 (13)	76 (24)	87 (31)	87 (31)	87 (31)	73 (23)	51 (11)	46 (8)	35 (2)	87 (31)
Mean daily maximum °F (°C)	−6.8 (−21.6)	1.1 (−17.2)	15.5 (−9.2)	33.5 (0.8)	55.0 (12.8)	64.4 (18.0)	69.7 (20.9)	65.1 (18.4)	50.2 (10.1)	25.6 (−3.6)	7.5 (−13.6)	−3.9 (−19.9)	31.4 (−0.3)
Daily mean °F (°C)	−14.9 (−26.1)	−11.2 (−24.0)	3.1 (−16.1)	20.0 (−6.7)	42.9 (6.1)	53.1 (11.7)	58.0 (14.4)	52.6 (11.4)	39.3 (4.1)	16.4 (−8.7)	−1.2 (−18.4)	−12.5 (−24.7)	20.5 (−6.4)
Mean daily minimum °F (°C)	−22.9 (−30.5)	−23.5 (−30.8)	−10.7 (−23.7)	6.4 (−14.2)	30.8 (−0.7)	42.0 (5.6)	46.0 (7.8)	40.1 (4.5)	28.5 (−1.9)	7.4 (−13.7)	−10.0 (−23.3)	−21.2 (−29.6)	9.4 (−12.6)
Record low °F (°C)	−80 (−62)	−64 (−53)	−62 (−52)	−43 (−42)	7 (−14)	20 (−7)	31 (−1)	17 (−8)	4 (−16)	−35 (−37)	−62 (−52)	−68 (−56)	−80 (−62)
Average precipitation inches (mm)	0.38 (9.7)	0.48 (12)	0.37 (9.4)	0.20 (5.1)	0.69 (18)	2.34 (59)	1.76 (45)	1.98 (50)	2.34 (59)	1.14 (29)	0.94 (24)	0.57 (14)	13.20 (335)
Average snowfall inches (cm)	8.7 (22)	8.0 (20)	8.7 (22)	4.7 (12)	0.1 (0.25)	0.0 (0.0)	0.0 (0.0)	0.0 (0.0)	2.1 (5.3)	15.0 (38)	15.7 (40)	14.1 (36)	77.3 (196)
Source: https://wrcc.dri.edu/cgi-bin/cliMAIN.pl?ak7778 (WRCC)
