= Innoko =

Innoko can refer to the:

- Holikachuk people
- Innoko River
- Innoko National Wildlife Refuge
- Innoko Wilderness
