= CXF =

CXF may refer to:

- Apache CXF, an open source software project developing a Web services framework
- CXF, the IATA and FAA LID code for Coldfoot Airport, Alaska, United States
