= Barry Clay =

American gold miner

Barry Lloyd Clay (born November 1, 1955) is a gold miner from Palmer, Alaska. In 1998, Clay discovered the largest gold nugget ever found in Alaska on Swift Creek near Ruby. The nugget, nicknamed "The Alaska Centennial Nugget", weighs 294.1 troy ounces. In 2007 he operated a mining camp that allowed tourists to search for gold on his claims. At the 2010 Alaska Miners Association convention he was named Miner of the Year by the Alaska Department of Natural Resources. He currently does consulting work for Alaska placer mining projects of all sizes and he plans to continue to mine for gold in the Ruby-Poorman mining district as of 2011.
