= PAPR =

PAPR may refer to:

- Peak-to-average power ratio, the peak divided by the root mean square (RMS) of the waveform
- Power Architecture Platform Reference
- Powered air-purifying respirator
- Prospect Creek Airport (ICAO location indicator: PAPR), in Prospect Creek, Alaska, United States
- papR (Bt), a component of quorum sensing in Bacillus thuringiensis
