= Coldfoot Airport =

Airport in Alaska, United States

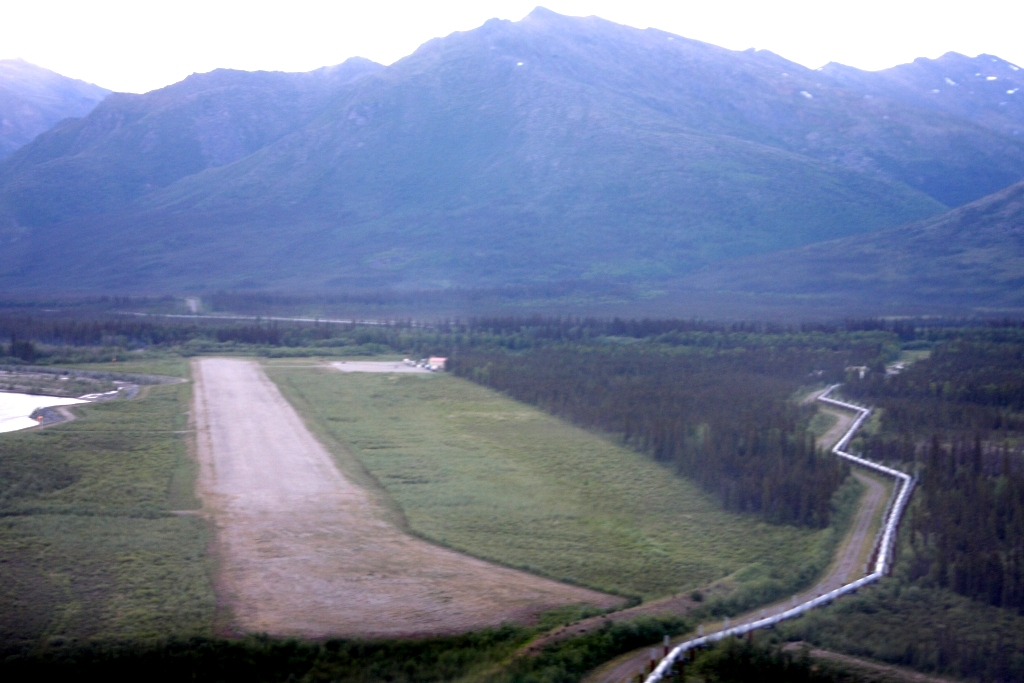
- Approach to Runway 1, June 2008 (Trans-Alaska Pipeline passes nearby)
- IATA: CXF; ICAO: PACX; FAA LID: CXF

Summary
- Airport type: Public
- Owner: State of Alaska DOT&PF - Northern Region
- Serves: Coldfoot, Alaska
- Elevation AMSL: 1,042 ft (318 m)
- Coordinates: 67°15′08″N 150°12′14″W

Map
- Location of airport in Alaska

Runways
Direction	Length		Surface
Direction	ft	m	Surface
1/19	4,001	1,219	Gravel

Statistics (2016)
- Aircraft operations: 1,000 (2013)
- Based aircraft: 3 (2017)
- Passengers: 1,013
- Freight: 9,223 lbs
- Source: Federal Aviation Administration

Coldfoot Airport (IATA: CXF, ICAO: PACX, FAA LID: CXF) is a state-owned, public-use airport located in Coldfoot, in the Yukon-Koyukuk Census Area in the U.S. state of Alaska.

== Facilities and aircraft ==
Coldfoot Airport covers an area of 288 acres (117 ha) at an elevation of 1,042 feet (318 m) above mean sea level. It has one runway designated 1/19 with a gravel surface measuring 4,000 by 100 feet (1,219 x 30 m). For the 12-month period ending December 31, 2005, the airport had 1,000 aircraft operations, an average of 83 per month: 80% air taxi and 20% general aviation.

=== Statistics ===
Carrier shares: January – December 2016
Carrier	Passengers (arriving and departing)
Warbelow's	890(84.33%)
Wright	170(15.67%)

Top domestic destinations: January – December 2016
Rank	City	Airport	Passengers
1	(Alaska) Fairbanks, AK	Fairbanks International Airport	460
2	(Alaska) Anaktuvuk Pass, AK	Anaktuvuk Pass Airport	10

== See also ==
- List of airports in Alaska
