= Coldfoot, Alaska =

Census-designated place in Alaska, U.S.

- CDP
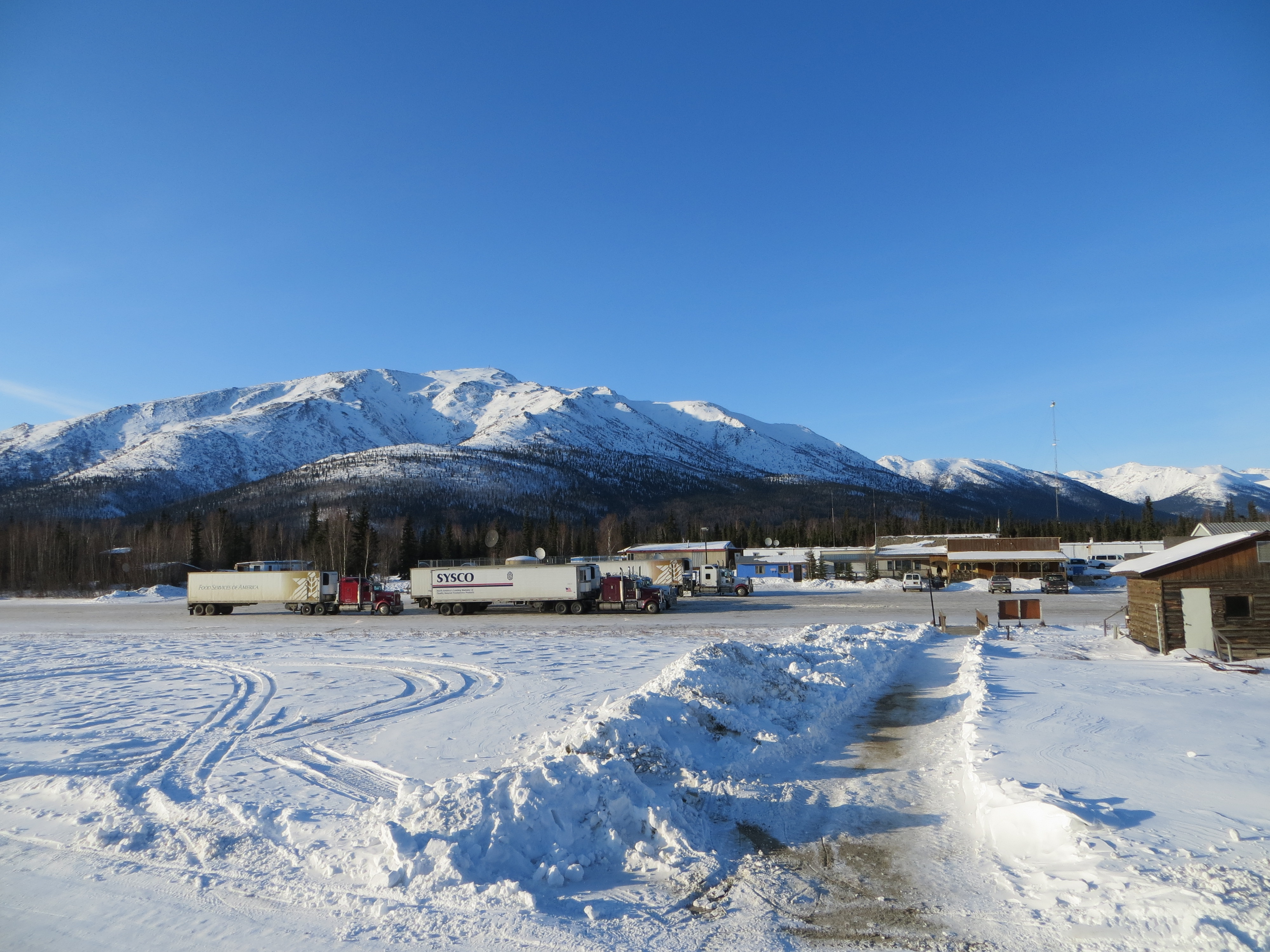
- Truck stop in Coldfoot

- Location within the state of Alaska
- Coordinates: 67°15′5″N 150°10′34″W
- Country: United States
- State: Alaska
- Census Area: Yukon-Koyukuk

Government
  - State senator: Mike Cronk (R)
  - State rep.: Rebecca Schwanke (R)

Area
  - Total: 35.84 sq mi (92.83 km^{2})
  - Land: 35.84 sq mi (92.83 km^{2})
  - Water: 0 sq mi (0.00 km^{2})
- Elevation: 1,014 ft (309 m)

Population (2020)
  - Total: 34
  - Density: 0.96/sq mi (0.37/km^{2})
- Time zone: UTC-9 (Alaska (AKST))
  - Summer (DST): UTC-8 (AKDT)
- ZIP code: 99726
- Area code: 907
- FIPS code: 02-16630
- GNIS feature ID: 1412829

Coldfoot is a census-designated place (CDP) in Yukon-Koyukuk Census Area in the U.S. state of Alaska. The population was 34 at the 2020 census. It is said that the name was derived from travelers getting "cold feet" about making the 240-some-mile journey north to Deadhorse.

Coldfoot primarily serves as a truck stop on the Dalton Highway from Fairbanks to Prudhoe Bay. North of Coldfoot, there are no services for 240 miles (400 km), until Deadhorse. It has a restaurant and a small number of overnight accommodations (converted pipeline construction camp quarters). Bus tours along the highway typically take two days, with passengers spending the night in Coldfoot. The BLM, USFWS, and NPS jointly staff a small visitor center during the summer. The Coldfoot truck stop was founded by Iditarod champion Dick Mackey, who started his operation by selling hamburgers out of a converted school bus. Truckers helped build the existing truck stop and cafe. The Alaska Department of Transportation & Public Facilities (DOT&PF) has a camp (maintenance station) in Coldfoot.

The town was originally a mining camp named Slate Creek, and around 1900 got its present name when prospectors going up the nearby Middle Fork Koyukuk River would get "cold feet" and turn around. In 1902, Coldfoot had two roadhouses, two stores, seven saloons, and a gambling house. A post office operated from 1902 to 1912, then reopened in 1984.

Coldfoot Airport, on the west side of the Dalton Highway, consists of a 4,000 foot (1,200 m) gravel strip, used for air taxi and general aviation.

Coldfoot has been featured on Ice Road Truckers, a Canadian reality television series airing on the History Channel. The truck stop was first seen during the show's third season.

== Geography ==
According to the United States Census Bureau, Coldfoot has a total area of 37.0 square miles (96 km^{2}), which is all land.

=== Climate ===
Coldfoot belongs to the typical subarctic climate type (Köppen Dfc), characterized by long and extremely cold winters and short, mild summers. Year-round temperature extremes range from −74 °F (−59 °C) to 88 °F (31 °C). A low temperature of −82 °F (−63 °C) has been measured at this place before but not officially recognized, otherwise making Coldfoot the coldest place in the United States, not Prospect Creek.

Climate data for Coldfoot, Alaska
Month	Jan	Feb	Mar	Apr	May	Jun	Jul	Aug	Sep	Oct	Nov	Dec	Year
Record high °F (°C)	32 (0)	38 (3)	40 (4)	52 (11)	77 (25)	88 (31)	88 (31)	82 (28)	68 (20)	50 (10)	43 (6)	31 (−1)	88 (31)
Mean daily maximum °F (°C)	−10.1 (−23.4)	−0.4 (−18.0)	11.4 (−11.4)	32.0 (0.0)	52.8 (11.6)	66.0 (18.9)	69.5 (20.8)	63.7 (17.6)	47.4 (8.6)	23.6 (−4.7)	4.9 (−15.1)	−1.5 (−18.6)	29.9 (−1.2)
Daily mean °F (°C)	−18.9 (−28.3)	−11.6 (−24.2)	−1.6 (−18.7)	18.8 (−7.3)	42.3 (5.7)	54.5 (12.5)	57.3 (14.1)	52.2 (11.2)	38.3 (3.5)	15.7 (−9.1)	−3.1 (−19.5)	−10.3 (−23.5)	19.4 (−7.0)
Mean daily minimum °F (°C)	−27.7 (−33.2)	−22.9 (−30.5)	−14.9 (−26.1)	5.6 (−14.7)	31.9 (−0.1)	43.0 (6.1)	45.1 (7.3)	40.6 (4.8)	28.8 (−1.8)	7.4 (−13.7)	−11.2 (−24.0)	−19.1 (−28.4)	8.9 (−12.8)
Record low °F (°C)	−74 (−59)	−68 (−56)	−58 (−50)	−41 (−41)	9 (−13)	28 (−2)	30 (−1)	23 (−5)	−2 (−19)	−35 (−37)	−52 (−47)	−61 (−52)	−74 (−59)
Average precipitation inches (mm)	0.37 (9.4)	0.44 (11)	0.43 (11)	0.31 (7.9)	0.96 (24)	1.91 (49)	2.66 (68)	2.03 (52)	2.79 (71)	1.50 (38)	1.05 (27)	0.90 (23)	15.34 (390)
Average snowfall inches (cm)	17.4 (44)	11.5 (29)	11.4 (29)	6.7 (17)	0.8 (2.0)	0.0 (0.0)	0.0 (0.0)	0.0 (0.0)	5.0 (13)	23.4 (59)	16.2 (41)	20.7 (53)	113.1 (287)
Source: WRCC

== Demographics ==
Historical population
Census	Pop.	Note	%±
2000	13		—
2010	10		−23.1%
2020	34		240.0%
U.S. Decennial Census; 2000 2010 2020

Coldfoot first appeared in the 2000 U.S. census as a census-designated place.

=== 2020 ===
Coldfoot, Alaska – racial and ethnic composition (NH = Non-Hispanic) Note: the US Census treats Hispanic/Latino as an ethnic category. This table excludes Latinos from the racial categories and assigns them to a separate category. Hispanics/Latinos may be of any race.
Race / Ethnicity	Pop 2000	Pop 2010	Pop 2020	% 2000	% 2010	% 2020
White alone (NH)	13	9	21	100.00%	90.00%	61.76%
Black or African American alone (NH)	0	0	0	0.00%	0.00%	0.00%
Native American or Alaska Native alone (NH)	0	1	3	0.00%	10.00%	8.82%
Asian alone (NH)	0	0	0	0.00%	0.00%	0.00%
Pacific Islander alone (NH)	0	0	0	0.00%	0.00%	0.00%
Some Other Race alone (NH)	0	0	2	0.00%	0.00%	5.88%
Mixed Race/Multi-Racial (NH)	0	0	4	0.00%	0.00%	11.76%
Hispanic or Latino (any race)	0	0	4	0.00%	0.00%	11.76%
Total	13	10	34	100.00%	100.00%	100.00%

In the 2000 census, there were thirteen people, six households, and one family residing in the CDP. The population density was 0.4 inhabitants per square mile (0.2/km^{2}). There were twelve housing units at an average density of 0.3 per square mile (0.1/km^{2}). The racial makeup of the CDP was 100% White. There were six households: two had children under the age of eighteen living with them, two were married couples living together, and four were non-families. Three households were made up of individuals. The average household size was 2.17, and the average family size was 4.

The age distribution was three under the age of 18, one from 18 to 24, five from 25 to 44, and four from 45 to 64. The median age was 40 years. There were four females and nine males, including three females and seven males aged eighteen and over.

The median household income was $61,250, and the per capita income was $42,620. None of the population was living below the poverty line.

== Education ==
The community was previously served by a school of the Yukon–Koyukuk School District.
