= Innoko Wilderness =

Wilderness area in Alaska, United States

- IUCN category Ib (wilderness area)
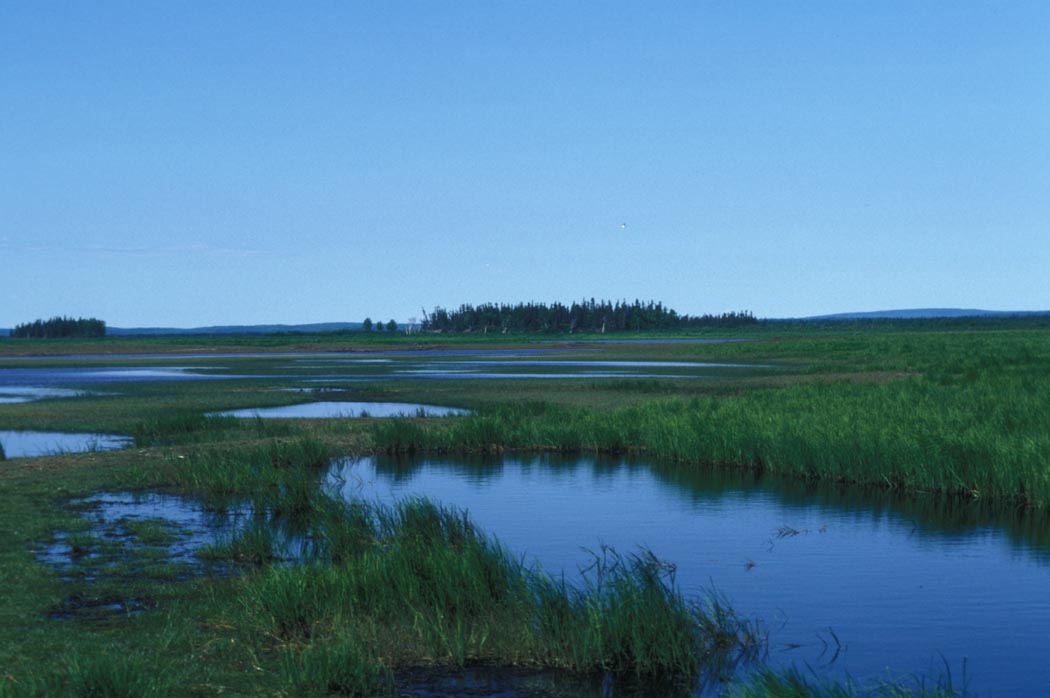
- Innoko Wilderness in the summer
- Interactive map of Innoko Wilderness
- Location: Innoko National Wildlife Refuge, Yukon-Koyukuk Census Area, Alaska, USA
- Nearest city: Unalakleet, Alaska
- Coordinates: 63°04′32″N 158°19′16″W
- Area: 1,240,000 acres (500,000 ha)
- Established: 1980
- Governing body: US Fish and Wildlife Service

Innoko Wilderness is a 1,240,000-acre (500,000 ha) wilderness area in the U.S. state of Alaska. It was designated by the United States Congress in 1980. It lies within the southeastern part of Innoko National Wildlife Refuge. Innoko Wilderness is a transition zone between the boreal forestland of interior Alaska and the open tundra of western Alaska. More than half of the Wilderness is wetlands of muskeg and marsh, lakes, rivers, and streams dotted with islands of black spruce and an understory of mosses, lichens, and shrubs. Along the Yukon and Innoko Rivers are numerous privately owned subsistence camps used periodically for hunting and fishing by Alaska Natives.

== Wildlife ==
More than 20,000 beavers live in the Innoko Wilderness, along with moose and caribou, black and brown bears, red foxes, coyotes, lynx, otters, wolves, and wolverines. An estimated 65,000 Canada geese summer in the Wilderness with more than 380,000 other waterfowl and shorebirds, including pintails, scaups, shovelers, scoters, wigeons, red-necked grebes, lesser yellowlegs, and Hudsonian godwits.

== See also ==
- List of U.S. Wilderness Areas
- Wilderness Act
