= Ruby, Alaska =

Ruby Tl'aa'ologhe
- City
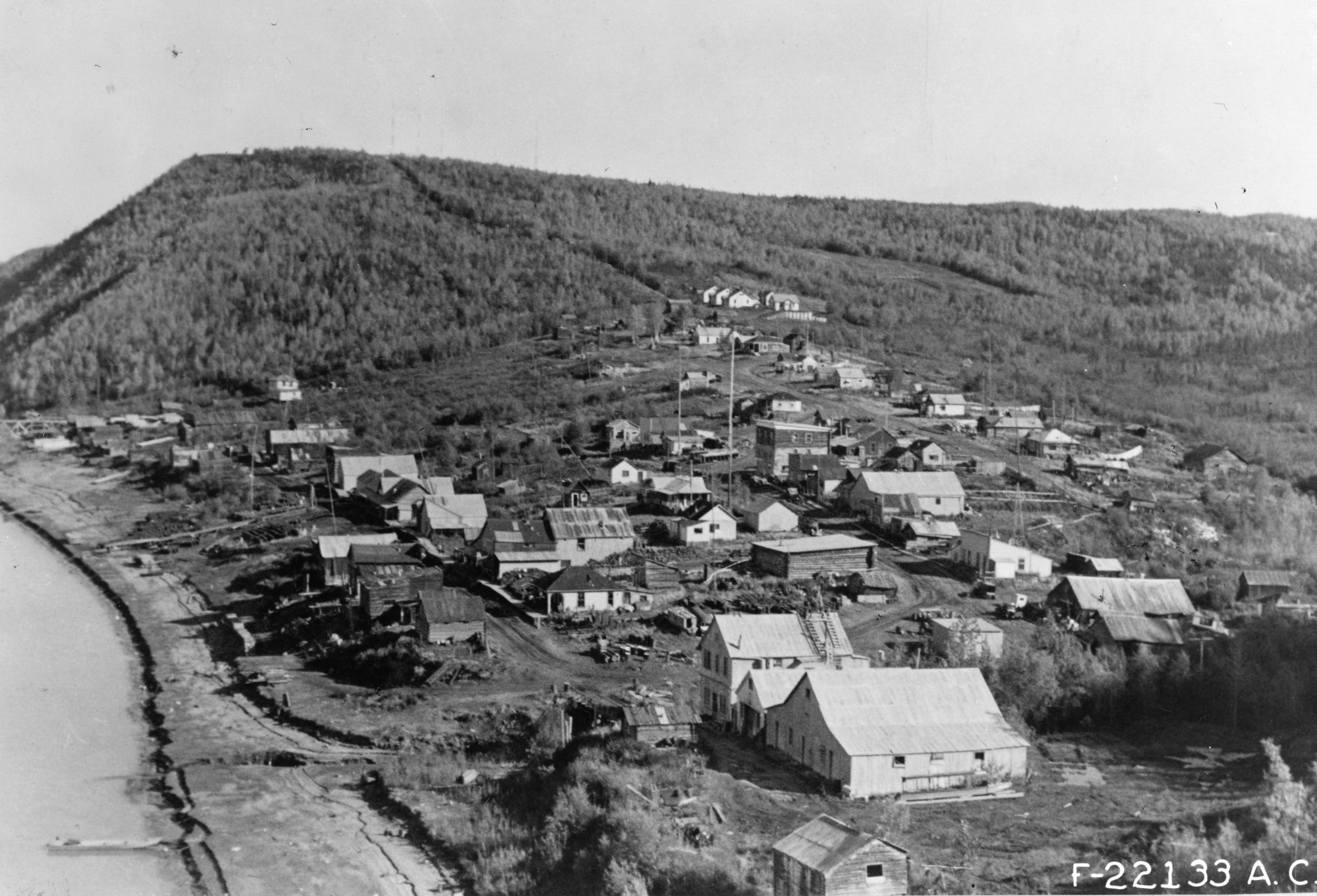
- Ruby in the 1940s
- Nickname: The Gem of the Yukon
- Location in Alaska
- Coordinates: 64°44′14″N 155°29′16″W
- Country: United States
- State: Alaska
- Census Area: Yukon-Koyukuk
- Incorporated: September 25, 1973

Government
  - Mayor: Elizabeth Captain
  - State senator: Click Bishop (R)
  - State rep.: Mike Cronk (R)

Area
  - Total: 7.02 sq mi (18.19 km^{2})
  - Land: 7.02 sq mi (18.19 km^{2})
  - Water: 0 sq mi (0.00 km^{2})
- Elevation: 249 ft (76 m)

Population (2020)
  - Total: 139
  - Density: 19.8/sq mi (7.64/km^{2})
- Time zone: UTC-9 (Alaska (AKST))
  - Summer (DST): UTC-8 (AKDT)
- ZIP code: 99768
- Area code: 907
- FIPS code: 02-65590
- GNIS feature ID: 1408878

Ruby (Koyukon: Tl'aa'ologhe) is an incorporated town in central western Alaska, situated on the south bank of the Yukon River at the northwesternmost tip of the Nowitna National Wildlife Refuge. It is accessible only by boat or air. A formerly sizeable gold-mining and lumbering town servicing the region, Ruby had a population of 139 at the 2020 census, with only a general store and post office remaining as businesses.

It is served by Ruby Airport.

== History ==
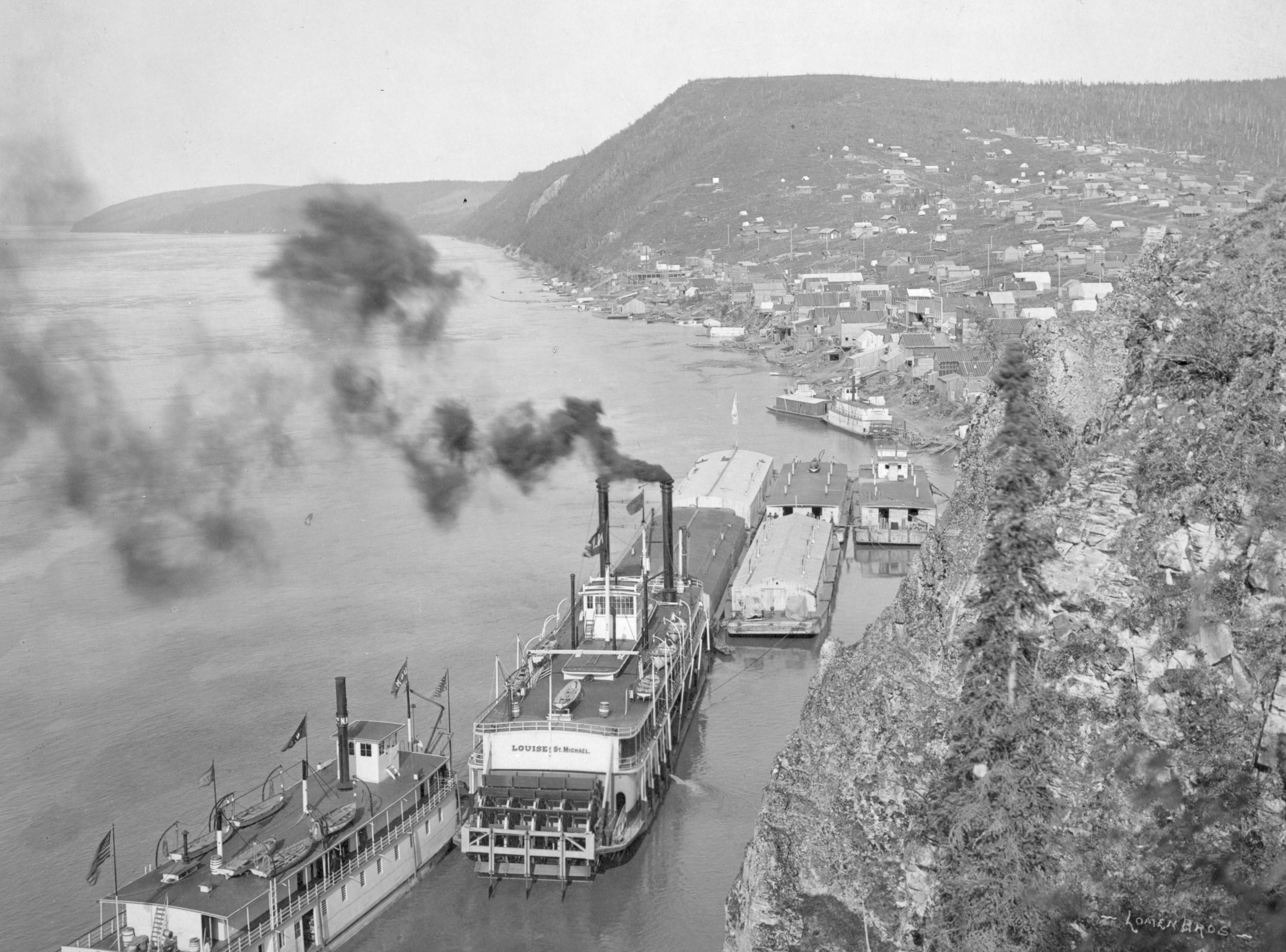
Riverboats on the Yukon River at Ruby during the town's heyday. ca. 1910

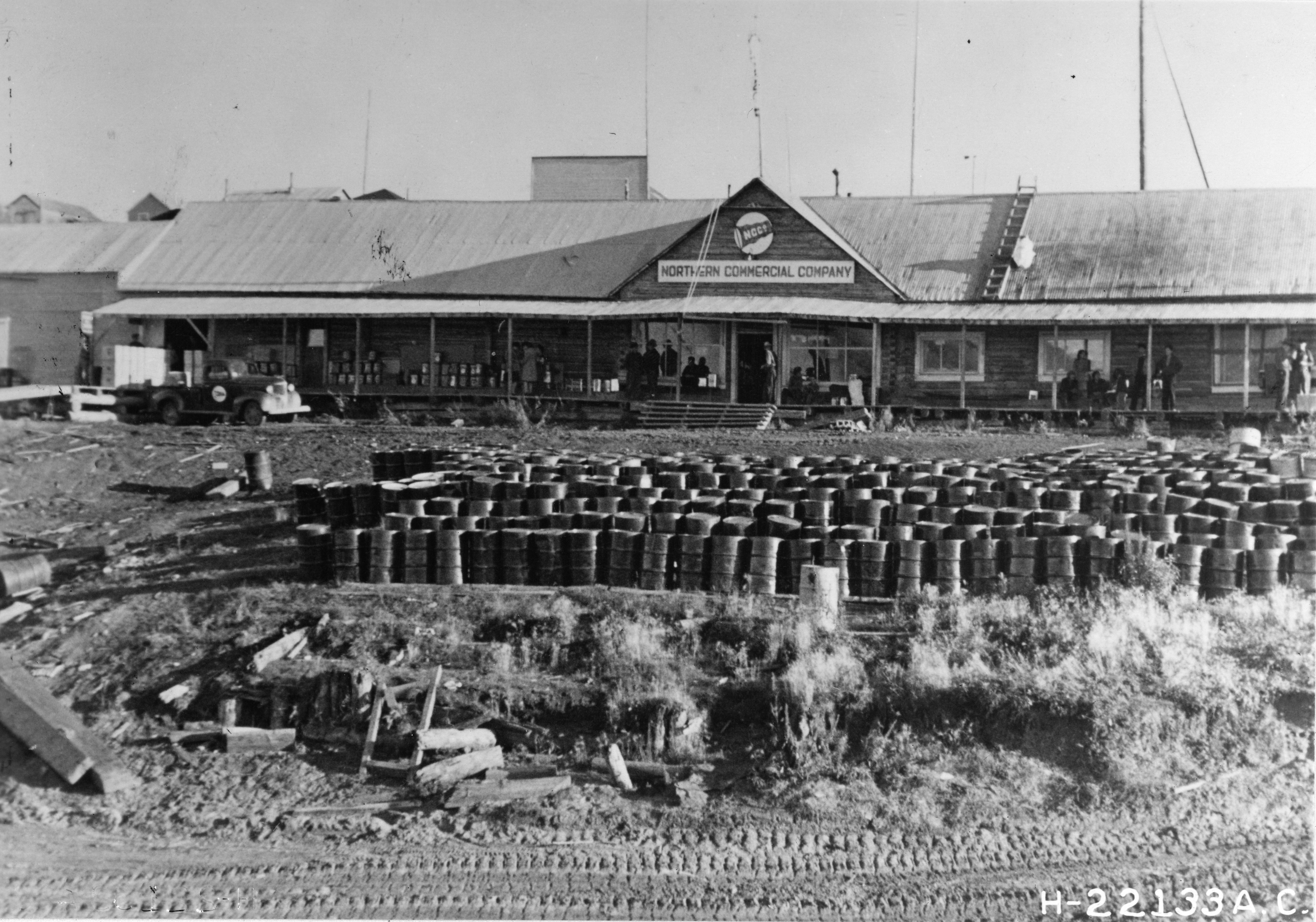
Northern Commercial Co.

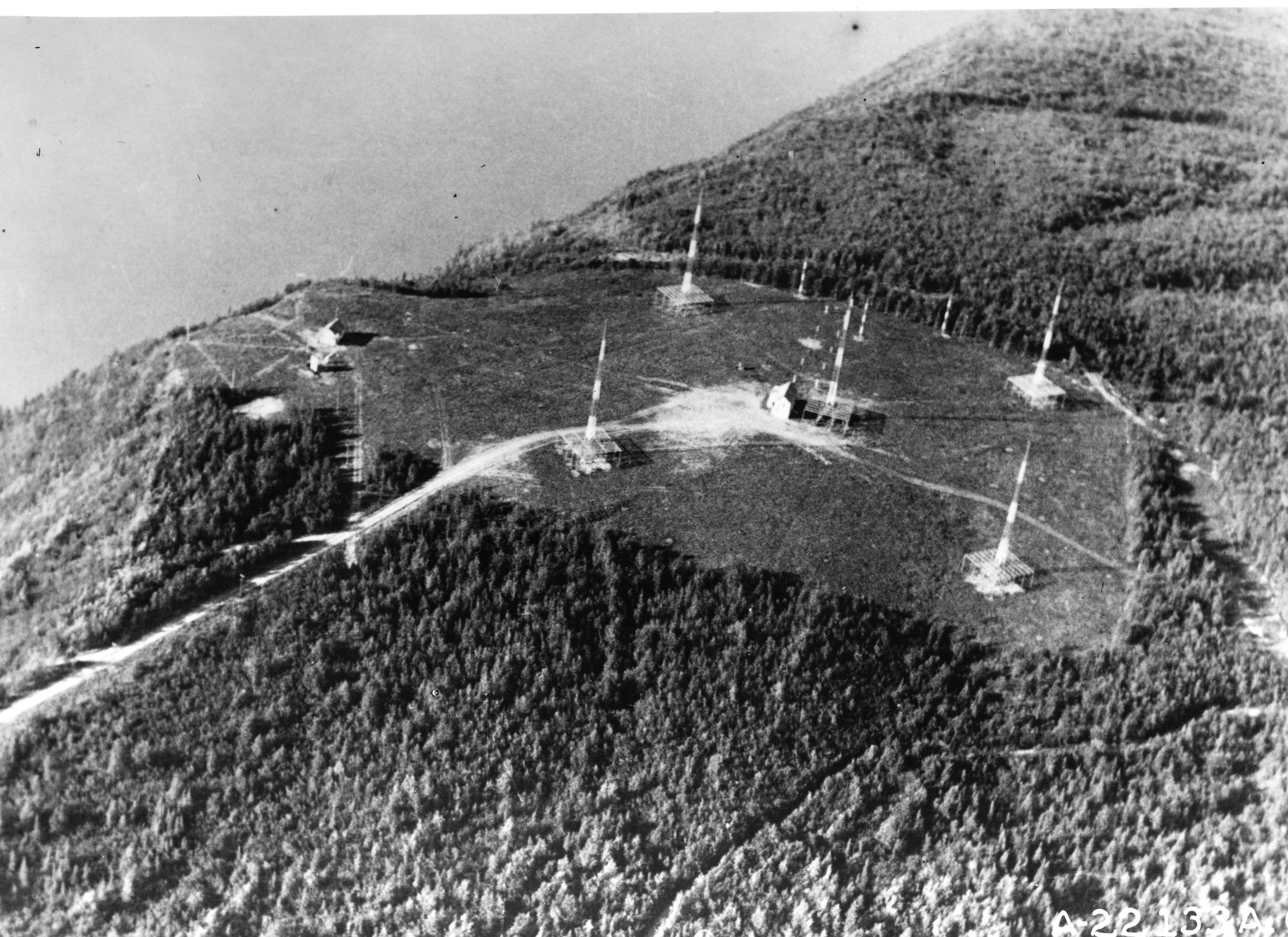
Communication towers at Ruby

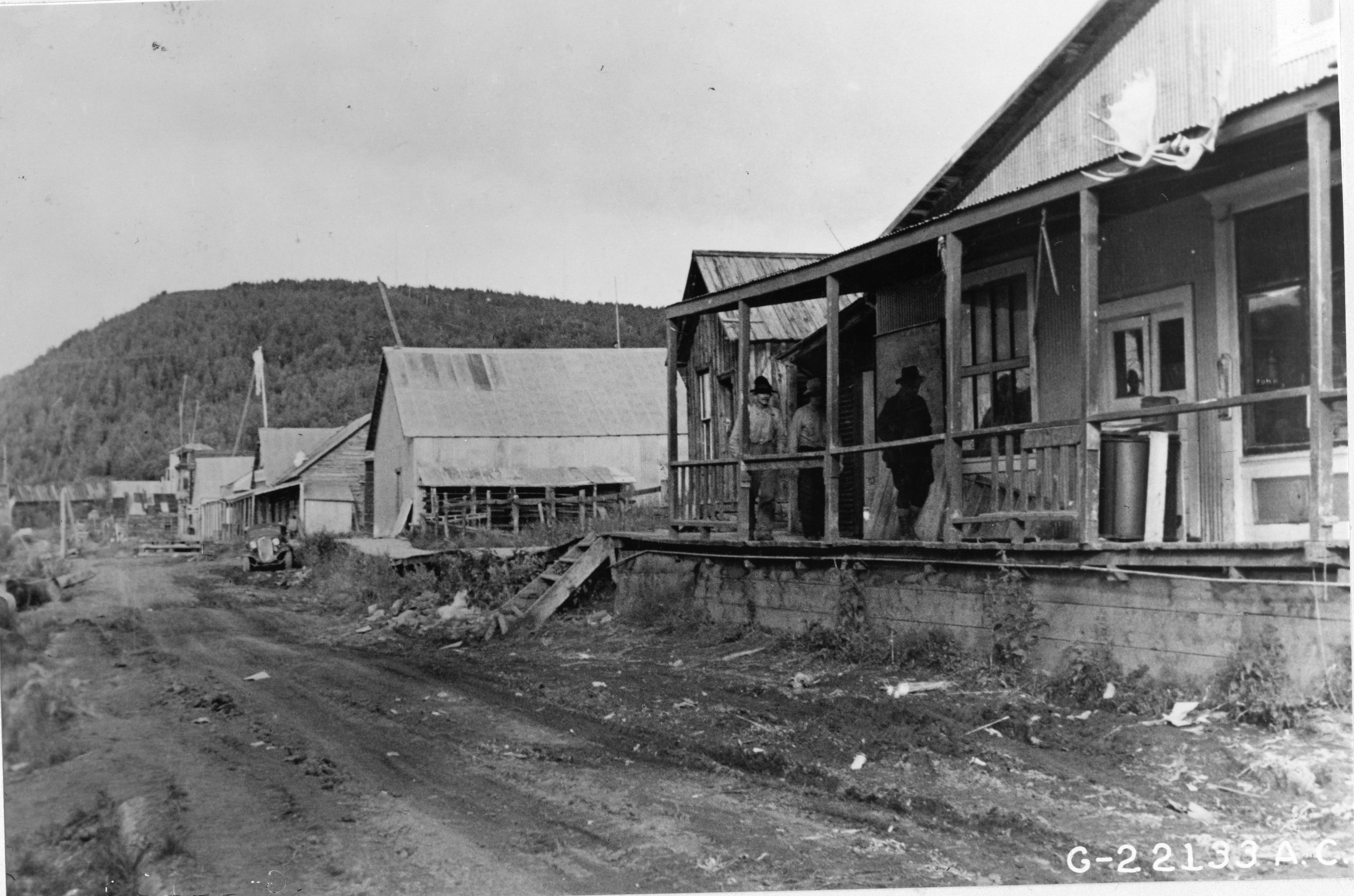
Main street

The town of Ruby was established in 1911 as the result of a gold rush. The amount of gold that is in the Fairbanks district is over 8 million troy ounces (250 tonnes) of gold, lodes have yielded over 4 million ounces. Gold was first discovered at the current townsite in 1906 on Ruby Creek. That discovery brought more prospectors to the area. In 1910 word leaked out about a gold strike on Long Creek, 30 miles south of Ruby, and a stampede was on. Discoveries on other nearby creeks followed and Ruby became the supply point for the mines.

At its peak the population was near 3,000, but by 1918 the town was in steep decline. Many of the men had left to fight in World War I, and several of the towns business people and their families were lost in the sinking of the Canadian passenger liner Sophia. A fire in 1929 destroyed much of the business district and a flood in 1931 took out what was left of buildings on the riverfront.

After World War II, Native Americans from near-by Kokrines relocated to Ruby to take advantage of the abandoned homes. There are currently fewer than 200 people living in Ruby.

The largest gold nugget ever found in Alaska, 294.10 troy ounces (322.67 oz; 9,148 g), was found near Ruby in 1998.

== Geography ==
Ruby is located at 64°44′14″N 155°29′16″W (64.737306, -155.487693).

According to the United States Census Bureau, the city has a total area of 7.6 square miles (20 km^{2}).

== Demographics ==
Historical population
Census	Pop.	Note	%±
1920	128		—
1930	132		3.1%
1940	138		4.5%
1950	132		−4.3%
1960	179		35.6%
1970	145		−19.0%
1980	197		35.9%
1990	170		−13.7%
2000	188		10.6%
2010	166		−11.7%
2020	139		−16.3%
U.S. Decennial Census

Ruby first appeared on the 1920 U.S. Census as an unincorporated village. It formally incorporated in 1973.

=== 2020 census ===
As of the 2020 census, Ruby had a population of 139. The median age was 38.5 years. 27.3% of residents were under the age of 18 and 20.9% of residents were 65 years of age or older. For every 100 females there were 117.2 males, and for every 100 females age 18 and over there were 106.1 males age 18 and over.

0.0% of residents lived in urban areas, while 100.0% lived in rural areas.

There were 56 households in Ruby, of which 30.4% had children under the age of 18 living in them. Of all households, 26.8% were married-couple households, 28.6% were households with a male householder and no spouse or partner present, and 32.1% were households with a female householder and no spouse or partner present. About 35.7% of all households were made up of individuals and 25.0% had someone living alone who was 65 years of age or older.

There were 103 housing units, of which 45.6% were vacant. The homeowner vacancy rate was 0.0% and the rental vacancy rate was 6.3%.

Racial composition as of the 2020 census
Race	Number	Percent
White	8	5.8%
Black or African American	0	0.0%
American Indian and Alaska Native	125	89.9%
Asian	0	0.0%
Native Hawaiian and Other Pacific Islander	0	0.0%
Some other race	0	0.0%
Two or more races	6	4.3%
Hispanic or Latino (of any race)	1	0.7%

=== 2000 census ===
As of the 2000 census, there were 188 people, 68 households, and 42 families residing in the city. The population density was 24.9 inhabitants per square mile (9.6/km^{2}). There were 107 housing units at an average density of 14.2 per square mile (5.5/km^{2}). The racial makeup of the city was 82.98% Native American, 13.83% White, and 3.19% from two or more races.

There were 68 households, out of which 44.1% had children under the age of 18 living with them, 35.3% were married couples living together, 16.2% had a female householder with no husband present, and 38.2% were non-families. 32.4% of all households were made up of individuals, and 10.3% had someone living alone who was 65 years of age or older. The average household size was 2.76 and the average family size was 3.55.

In the city, the age distribution of the population shows 37.8% under the age of 18, 8.0% from 18 to 24, 23.4% from 25 to 44, 25.5% from 45 to 64, and 5.3% who were 65 years of age or older. The median age was 33 years. For every 100 females, there were 111.2 males. For every 100 females age 18 and over, there were 108.9 males.

The median income for a household in the city was $24,375, and the median income for a family was $26,667. Males had a median income of $21,250 versus $24,167 for females. The per capita income for the city was $9,544. 32.3% of the population and 23.8% of families were below the poverty line. 45.3% of those under the age of 18 are living below the poverty line.

== Education ==
The Yukon–Koyukuk School District operates the Merreline A. Kangas School in Ruby.

== Notable people ==
- Barry Clay (born 1955), Discovered Alaska's largest gold nugget, 294 oz (9.15 kg), in 1998 in the Ruby mining district
- Emmitt Peters (1940–2020), Last rookie to win the Iditarod Trail Sled Dog Race (in 1975)

== See also ==
- Ruby-Poorman mining district
