= Nowitna River =

Tributary of the Yukon River in the Alaska, USA

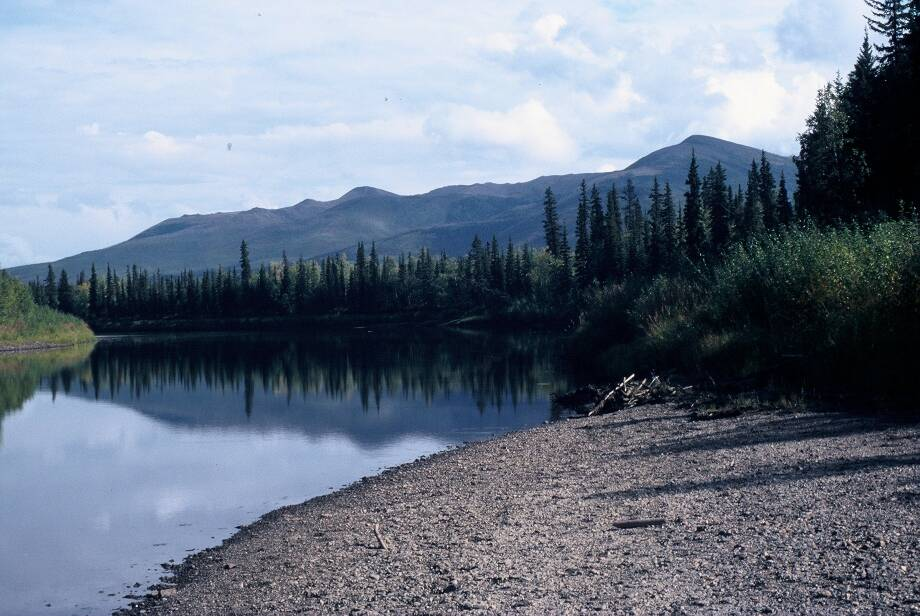
- Gravel bar in the Nowitna National Wildlife Refuge

- Location of the mouth of the Nowitna River in Alaska

Location
- Country: United States
- State: Alaska
- Census Area: Yukon–Koyukuk

Physical characteristics
- Source: Kuskokwim Mountains
  - coordinates: 63°30′28″N 155°32′34″W
  - elevation: 1,688 ft (515 m)
- Mouth: Yukon River
  - location: 38 miles (61 km) northeast of Ruby
  - coordinates: 64°55′38″N 154°16′11″W
  - elevation: 154 ft (47 m)
- Length: 250 mi (400 km)

National Wild and Scenic River
- Type: Wild 223.0 miles (358.9 km)
- Designated: December 2, 1980

The Nowitna River is a 250-mile (400 km) tributary of the Yukon River in the U.S. state of Alaska. The river flows northeast from the Kuskokwim Mountains through Nowitna National Wildlife Refuge and enters the larger river 38 miles (61 km) northeast of Ruby and southwest of Tanana. Major tributaries include the Titna, Big Mud, Little Mud, Lost, and Sulatna rivers.

In 1980, the 225 miles (362 km) of the river within the wildlife refuge were designated "wild" and added to the National Wild and Scenic Rivers System. The designation means that most of the Nowitna is unpolluted, free-flowing, and generally inaccessible except by trail.

== Boating ==
It is possible to run the Nowitna in many kinds of boats, including hard-shell, folding, or inflatable canoes and kayaks or inflatable rafts. Most of the river is slow-moving and meandering, rated Class I (easy) on the International Scale of River Difficulty. The exception occurs in Nowitna Canyon between Mastodon Creek and Big Mud River along the middle reaches of the Nowitna. This segment includes Class II (medium) rapids.

Dangers include black bears as well as rapids. Navigating can be difficult at times because of upriver winds, especially on the lower reaches.

== See also ==
- List of National Wild and Scenic Rivers
- List of rivers of Alaska
