= Prospect Creek Airport =

- IATA: PPC; ICAO: PAPR; FAA LID: PPC

Summary
- Airport type: Public
- Owner: State of Alaska DOT&PF
- Serves: Prospect Creek, Alaska
- Elevation AMSL: 1,095 ft / 334 m
- Coordinates: 66°48′51″N 150°38′37″W

Map
- Location of airport in Alaska

Runways
Direction	Length		Surface
Direction	ft	m	Surface
1/19	4,968	1,514	Gravel

Statistics (2008)
- Aircraft operations: 498
- Source: Federal Aviation Administration

Prospect Creek Airport (IATA: PPC, ICAO: PAPR, FAA LID: PPC) is a state-owned public-use airport located three nautical miles (5.5 km) northeast of Prospect Creek, in the Yukon-Koyukuk Census Area of the U.S. state of Alaska.

== Facilities and aircraft ==
Prospect Creek Airport has one runway designated 1/19 with a gravel surface measuring 4,968 by 150 feet (1,514 x 46 m). For the 12-month period ending July 9, 2008, the airport had 498 aircraft operations, an average of 41 per month: 51% air taxi, 44% general aviation and 5% scheduled commercial.
