= Crow Lake (Alaska) =

Lake in the state of Alaska, United States

- Location within Alaska Location within North America
- Location: Yukon-Koyukuk Census Area, Alaska
- Coordinates: 65°45′58″N 156°48′17″W
- Basin countries: United States
- Surface elevation: 203 ft (62 m)

Crow Lake is a lake in Yukon-Koyukuk Census Area, Alaska, United States, one mile (1.6 km) south of Moose Lake and 17 miles (27 km) northwest of Roundabout Mountain. Crow Lake lies at an elevation of 203 ft (62 m).
