= Nowitna National Wildlife Refuge =

Wildlife Refuge in Alaska, USA

- IUCN category IV (habitat/species management area)
- Location within Alaska
- Location: Alaska, United States
- Nearest city: Ruby, Alaska
- Coordinates: 64°40′00″N 154°00′02″W
- Area: 2,100,000 acres (8,500 km^{2})
- Established: 1980
- Governing body: U.S. Fish and Wildlife Service
- Website: Nowitna NWR

The heart of Nowitna National Wildlife Refuge is a lowland basin of forests and wetlands that forms the floodplain of the meandering Nowitna River. The refuge's climate is typically marked by light precipitation, mild winds, long, hard winters and short, relatively warm, summers. The hills that circle the refuge lowlands are capped by alpine tundra.

It takes a week in a canoe, or more than an hour in a small plane, to traverse the refuge's 2,100,000 acres (8,500 km^{2}) of pristine wildlife habitat. Approximately 223 miles (359 km) of the Nowitna River's 283-mile (455 km) length flow within the boundaries of the refuge. Fish species inhabiting the river and its related lakes and streams include sheefish, burbot, whitefish, sucker, king and chum salmon, northern pike and arctic grayling.

The slow, meandering lower reaches of the Nowitna wander through one of Alaska's many productive waterfowl nurseries. The grassy margins of the river, surrounding lakes, and waterways provide breeding habitat for trumpeter swans, white-fronted geese, canvasback ducks, cranes, and many other migratory species. More than 120 bird species have been sighted on the refuge during summer months, but only a few dozen hardy species remain through winters.

Mature white spruce in the forested lowlands provide cover and den sites for marten, and trapping these and other furbearers remains important to the economy of people in the region. In fact, refuge lands have been used for centuries by Koyukon Athabascans for hunting, fishing, trapping and other subsistence activities. Mammal species including two species of fox, moose, wolf packs, Canadian lynx, marten, wolverine, black and grizzly bear species might be encountered anywhere on the refuge.

== See also ==
- List of largest National Wildlife Refuges
