= Galena, Alaska =

Galena Notaalee Denh (Koyukon)
- City
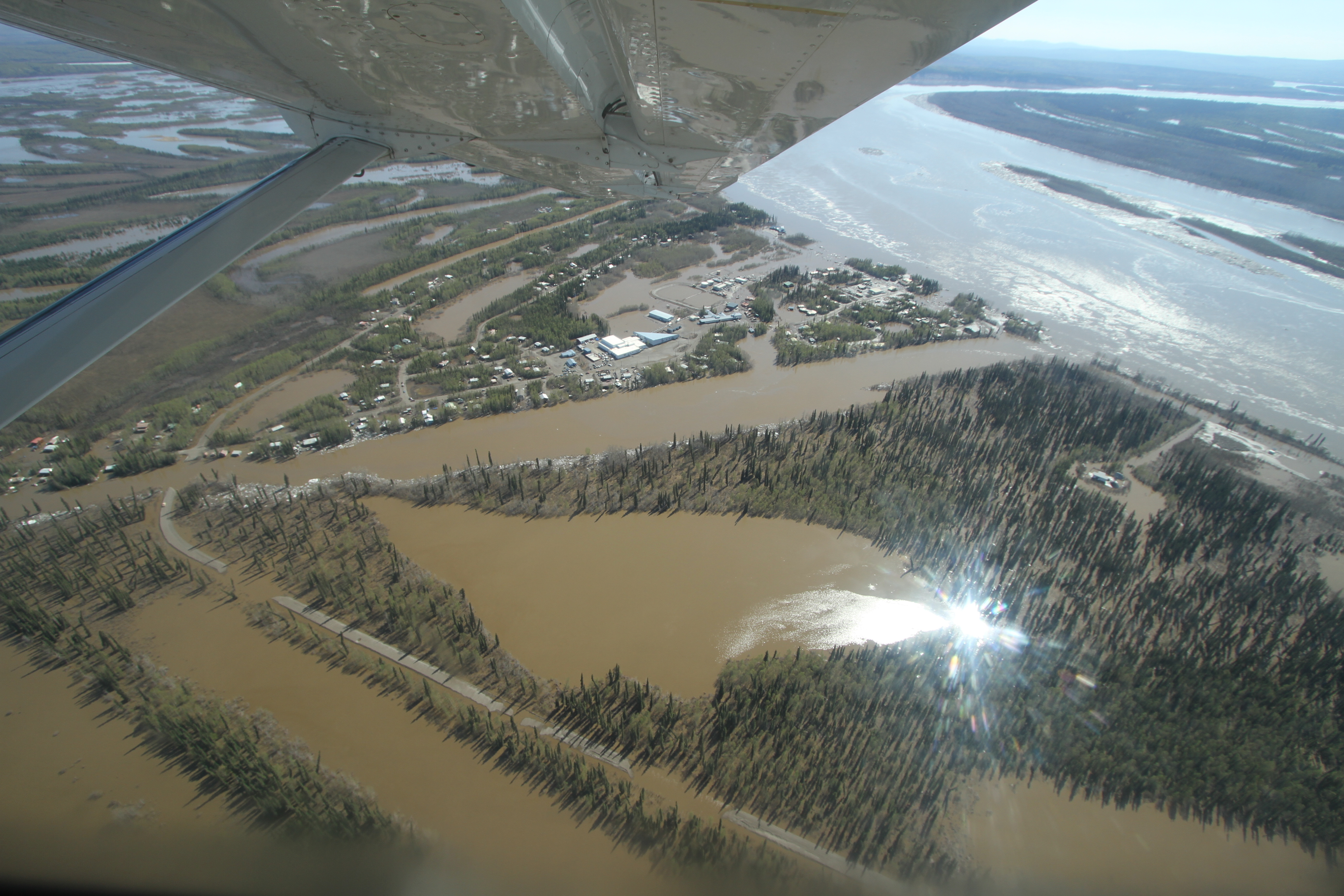
- Galena following the 2013 flood

- Location in Alaska
- Coordinates: 64°44′26″N 156°53′8″W
- Country: United States
- State: Alaska
- Census Area: Yukon-Koyukuk
- Incorporated: October 26, 1971

Government
  - Mayor: Tiffany George
  - State senator: Click Bishop (R)
  - State rep.: Mike Cronk (R)

Area
  - Total: 24.51 sq mi (63.47 km^{2})
  - Land: 17.65 sq mi (45.72 km^{2})
  - Water: 6.85 sq mi (17.75 km^{2})
- Elevation: 128 ft (39 m)

Population (2020)
  - Total: 472
  - Density: 26.7/sq mi (10.32/km^{2})
- Time zone: UTC-9 (Alaska (AKST))
  - Summer (DST): UTC-8 (AKDT)
- ZIP code: 99741
- Area code: 907
- FIPS code: 02-27530
- GNIS feature ID: 1402457
- Website: http://www.ci.galena.ak.us/

Galena (/ɡəˈliːnə/) (Koyukon: Notaalee Denh) is a city in the Yukon-Koyukuk Census Area in the U.S. state of Alaska. At the 2020 census the population was 472, slightly up from 470 in 2010. Galena was established in 1918, and a military airfield was built adjacent to the city during World War II. The city was incorporated in 1971.

== History ==
=== Prehistory and early history ===
The Koyukon Athabascans had seasonal camps in the area and moved as the wild game migrated. In the summer many families floated on rafts to the Yukon River to fish for salmon. There were 12 summer fish camps located on the Yukon River between the Koyukuk River and the Nowitna River. Galena was established in 1920 near an Athabascan fish camp called Henry's Point. It became a supply and point for nearby lead ore mines that opened in 1918 and 1919, and from which Galena takes its name.

=== Military air base ===
In 1941 and 1942, during World War II, a military air field was built adjacent to the civilian airport, and the two facilities shared the runway and flight line facilities. This air field was designated Galena Air Force Station shortly after the split of the United States Air Force from the United States Army, which occurred as a result of the National Security Act of 1947. During the 1950s, the construction of additional military facilities at Galena and the nearby Campion Air Force Station, in support of Galena's mission as a forward operating base under the auspices of the 5072nd Air Base Group, headquartered at Elmendorf Air Force Base, near Anchorage, provided improvements to the airport and the local infrastructure, causing economic growth for the area.

Following the end of the Cold War, in 1993, operation of Galena Air Force Station was turned over to a contractor, and all military personnel were withdrawn with only small groups of active personnel visiting the base on an as-needed basis. The former military facility remains in use effectively as a forward operating site that is used occasionally by the military. This use came under scrutiny by the Base Realignment and Closure Committee in the late 2000s and was officially closed on October 1, 2010. The Air Force retains responsibility for toxin cleanup in the area and engineers from Eielson Air Force Base in Fairbanks still visit the site on occasion. The base is now totally controlled by the City of Galena, the Galena School District and the Alaska Department of Transportation. The Alaska Wing of the Civil Air Patrol (CAP) was pursuing retaining one of the F-16 fighter hangars as a CAP facility for the CAP Wing in Galena, the "Yukon Squadron".

=== Modern era ===
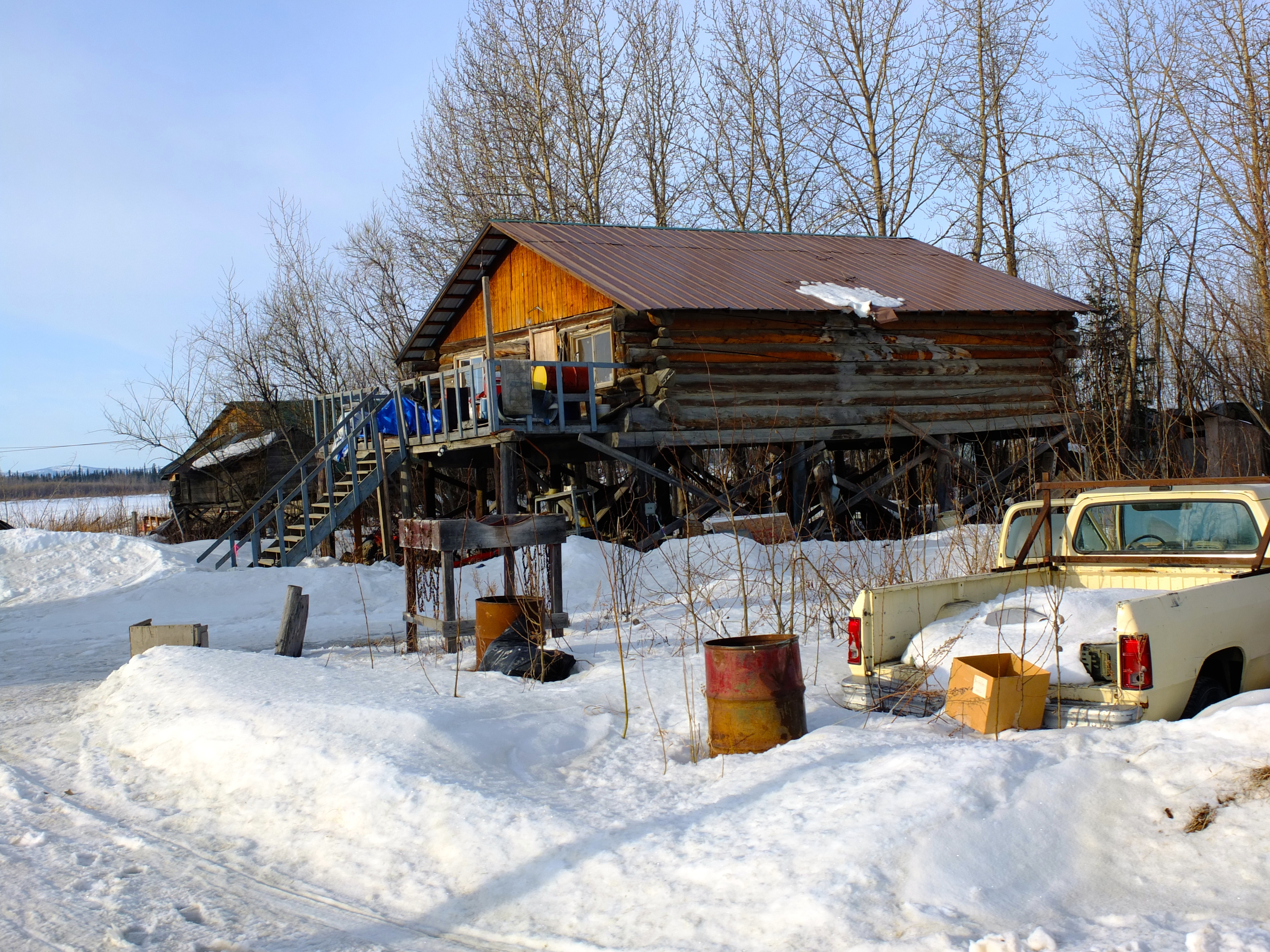
A home in Galena that was rebuilt after the flood of 2013

The City of Galena gained notoriety in 2011 when it was noted in media reports as being the US community that received the most benefits from lobbying efforts. The town evaded bankruptcy by aggressively lobbying for state and federal funds for the GILA boarding school in the town, which produced funds that turned the city's finances around.

In May 2013, Galena suffered a catastrophic flood when the spring breakup on the Yukon River caused an ice jam approximately 20 miles downstream, backing up the river and affecting 90% of homes in the city. This flood was on a scale never seen before by Galena residents. In the part of town closest to the river, houses were submerged to the roofs in water, and properties on higher ground suffered damage as well. Most of the residents were able to evacuate thanks to the efforts of the local airlines, volunteer missionary pilots, and the Alaska National Guard. Some of the residents chose to stay behind and took refuge in the few last remaining dry parts of town. The flood dike the Air Force built around both the runway and the GILA boarding school managed to keep the river from reaching them. Efforts were made to help Galena rebuild, with the assistance of the Federal Emergency Management Agency and volunteer groups.

== Geography and climate ==
Galena is located at 64°44′26″N 156°53′8″W (64.740643, -156.885462).

Galena is located on the north bank of the Yukon River, 45 mi (72 km) east of Nulato. The Innoko National Wildlife Refuge is southwest of Galena.

According to the United States Census Bureau, the city has a total area of 24.0 square miles (62 km^{2}), of which, 17.9 square miles (46 km^{2}) of it is land and 6.1 square miles (16 km^{2}) of it (25.41%) is water.

Galena is inaccessible by road to other parts of Alaska. Residents rely on river cargo in the brief summer season for the bulk of their needs, and planes, boats, or snowmachines to access the outside world.

Galena has a subarctic climate (Koppen Dfc), with short, mild summers and severely cold winters.

Climate data for Galena, Alaska (1991–2020 normals, (Note: Mean monthly maxima and minima (i.e. the highest and lowest temperature readings during an entire month or year) calculated based on data at said location from 1991 to 2020.) extremes 1942–present (Note: Temperature extremes from 1942 to 1993 are recorded by WRCC, and extreme values from 1996 to the present are recorded by NOAA.))
Month	Jan	Feb	Mar	Apr	May	Jun	Jul	Aug	Sep	Oct	Nov	Dec	Year
Record high °F (°C)	43 (6)	48 (9)	50 (10)	64 (18)	85 (29)	92 (33)	91 (33)	87 (31)	75 (24)	59 (15)	45 (7)	44 (7)	92 (33)
Mean maximum °F (°C)	27.3 (−2.6)	32.9 (0.5)	36.5 (2.5)	53.1 (11.7)	72.8 (22.7)	80.7 (27.1)	82.5 (28.1)	78.2 (25.7)	64.0 (17.8)	47.1 (8.4)	30.5 (−0.8)	26.1 (−3.3)	84.4 (29.1)
Mean daily maximum °F (°C)	−2.7 (−19.3)	9.0 (−12.8)	18.6 (−7.4)	37.7 (3.2)	56.6 (13.7)	68.7 (20.4)	69.4 (20.8)	62.4 (16.9)	51.7 (10.9)	31.4 (−0.3)	11.6 (−11.3)	2.7 (−16.3)	34.8 (1.6)
Daily mean °F (°C)	−9.8 (−23.2)	−0.3 (−17.9)	6.9 (−13.9)	27.2 (−2.7)	45.6 (7.6)	58.0 (14.4)	60.2 (15.7)	54.0 (12.2)	43.5 (6.4)	25.5 (−3.6)	5.5 (−14.7)	−4.4 (−20.2)	26.0 (−3.3)
Mean daily minimum °F (°C)	−16.8 (−27.1)	−9.5 (−23.1)	−4.8 (−20.4)	16.8 (−8.4)	34.6 (1.4)	47.3 (8.5)	51.1 (10.6)	45.6 (7.6)	35.4 (1.9)	19.6 (−6.9)	−0.6 (−18.1)	−11.5 (−24.2)	17.3 (−8.2)
Mean minimum °F (°C)	−49.6 (−45.3)	−41.1 (−40.6)	−28.1 (−33.4)	−9.5 (−23.1)	19.4 (−7.0)	37.3 (2.9)	41.2 (5.1)	33.3 (0.7)	21.7 (−5.7)	−2.9 (−19.4)	−26.3 (−32.4)	−39.5 (−39.7)	−51.3 (−46.3)
Record low °F (°C)	−70 (−57)	−64 (−53)	−54 (−48)	−35 (−37)	−7 (−22)	25 (−4)	28 (−2)	28 (−2)	2 (−17)	−31 (−35)	−52 (−47)	−62 (−52)	−70 (−57)
Average precipitation inches (mm)	0.60 (15)	0.75 (19)	0.59 (15)	0.33 (8.4)	0.44 (11)	1.59 (40)	2.04 (52)	2.47 (63)	1.75 (44)	1.18 (30)	1.24 (31)	0.95 (24)	13.93 (354)
Average snowfall inches (cm)	11.0 (28)	14.9 (38)	9.1 (23)	4.6 (12)	0.4 (1.0)	0.0 (0.0)	0.0 (0.0)	0.0 (0.0)	0.3 (0.76)	8.3 (21)	12.8 (33)	15.8 (40)	77.2 (196)
Average precipitation days (≥ 0.01 inch)	7.4	9.4	7.0	5.6	6.0	9.3	11.2	14.5	11.9	11.1	10.0	10.8	114.2
Average snowy days (≥ 0.1 inch)	7.5	9.2	6.8	4.0	0.4	0.0	0.0	0.0	0.2	6.7	9.9	10.9	55.6
Source: NOAA

== Demographics ==
Historical population
Census	Pop.	Note	%±
1890	15		—
1930	67		—
1940	44		−34.3%
1950	176		300.0%
1960	261		48.3%
1970	302		15.7%
1980	765		153.3%
1990	833		8.9%
2000	675		−19.0%
2010	470		−30.4%
2020	472		0.4%
U.S. Decennial Census

Galena first appeared on the 1890 U.S. Census as the unincorporated native village of "Notaloten". It would not appear again until 1930, when it would first return as the village of Galena. It formally incorporated as a city in 1971.

=== 2020 census ===
As of the 2020 census, Galena had a population of 472. The median age was 36.1 years. 29.4% of residents were under the age of 18 and 11.7% of residents were 65 years of age or older. For every 100 females there were 108.8 males, and for every 100 females age 18 and over there were 103.0 males age 18 and over.

0.0% of residents lived in urban areas, while 100.0% lived in rural areas.

There were 178 households in Galena, of which 36.5% had children under the age of 18 living in them. Of all households, 38.2% were married-couple households, 22.5% were households with a male householder and no spouse or partner present, and 25.8% were households with a female householder and no spouse or partner present. About 32.1% of all households were made up of individuals and 12.4% had someone living alone who was 65 years of age or older.

There were 269 housing units, of which 33.8% were vacant. The homeowner vacancy rate was 0.8% and the rental vacancy rate was 3.6%.

Racial composition as of the 2020 census
Race	Number	Percent
White	114	24.2%
Black or African American	0	0.0%
American Indian and Alaska Native	326	69.1%
Asian	2	0.4%
Native Hawaiian and Other Pacific Islander	0	0.0%
Some other race	7	1.5%
Two or more races	23	4.9%
Hispanic or Latino (of any race)	4	0.8%

=== 2010 census ===
As of the census of 2010, there were 470 people, 190 households, and 123 families residing in the city. The population density was 26.3 inhabitants per square mile (10.2/km^{2}). There were 264 housing units at an average density of 14.7 units per square mile (5.7 units/km^{2}). The racial makeup of the city was 29.4% White, 0.0% Black or African American, 63.6% Native American, 0.6% Asian, 0.0% Pacific Islander, 0.20% from other races, and 6.2% from two or more races. 2.3% of the population were Hispanic or Latino of any race.

In the city, the age distribution of the population shows 29.3% under the age of 18, 11.0% from 20 to 29, 20.8% from 30 to 44, 27.6% from 45 to 64, and 10.4% who were 65 years of age or older. The median age was 36.8 years. There were 229 females, 166 of whom were 18 years and over, and 241 males, 171 of whom were 18 years and over.

=== Income ===
The median income for a household in the city was $60,313, and the median income for a family was $62,917. The per capita income for the city was $26,551. About 11.5% of the population were below the poverty line and 18.9% were below 125 percent of the poverty line.

== Government and public safety ==
The headquarters for the Koyukuk/Innoko/Nowitna National Wildlife Refuge is located in Galena.

The City of Galena is incorporated as a first-class city, governed by a city council. The city's mayor is Edward Pitka Jr.

Galena is the seat of the Galena Village, also known as the Louden Tribal Council, a Federally Recognized Tribal Government. The Tribal Council is elected to represent the local Athabascan Native community. The current council's tribal chief is Charlie Green.

Patch of the Galena Police Department.

The City of Galena operates a full-time police department. There is an Alaska State Troopers post in Galena with two troopers and a trooper-pilot.

Galena has a volunteer search and rescue squad, and a volunteer fire department.

== Education ==
As Galena is incorporated as a first-class city and located in the Unorganized Borough, it is required by state law to operate its own schools, Galena City School District, apart from the Rural Education Attendance Areas which otherwise prevail outside of incorporated boroughs. Along with other such cities across Alaska, Galena's school district operates a boarding school and a correspondence study program, to increase state funding which would not otherwise be available with the local pupil base.

Galena has three schools. Galena City School is primarily for local K–12 students. There is a public library located in the Sidney C. Huntington School. Sidney Huntington (1915–2015) was a longtime resident and leader in Galena and the author of Shadows on the Koyukuk, a popular book on Alaska.

The vocational Galena Interior Learning Academy (GILA) is a boarding school that draws students from around the state. GILA is located on the site of the former Galena Air Force Station and is one of three public boarding high schools in Alaska; the second in size behind Mount Edgecumbe High School in Sitka. The third is the Nenana Living School in Nenana. GILA uses the former barracks as a dorm, the former PX and headquarters buildings as classrooms, and the dining hall as a cafeteria, along with the gym and other facilities. Recently, a new STEM building was constructed to replace one of the old Air Force buildings that had been used for classrooms. GILA provides educational and vocational training to young men and women from all over Alaska, grades 9–12, with most students coming from remote Native Alaskan villages from the Interior, North Slope and Aleutian Islands. GILA hosts various training and regional conferences throughout the year. GILA student enrollment grew from 110 to 180 in the 2009–10 school year.

Galena's third school is Interior Distance Education of Alaska (IDEA), a statewide homeschool support program that serves 3,500 students across the state. As correspondence programs are tabulated by the Alaska Department of Education & Early Development as a single school, IDEA is considered the largest school by enrollment in all of Alaska.

== Transportation, utilities and other facilities ==
Galena's Edward G. Pitka Sr. Airport (Code GAL) is the former Galena Air Force Station field and with a paved runway of over 8000 feet is the largest public, state-maintained airport in the Interior of Alaska. The control tower was demolished when the Air Force vacated the facility in 2007. The Airport is also the home of the "Yukon Squadron" of the AK Wing, Civil Air Patrol (CAP), which covers much of lp the interior region to the Bering Sea for Search and Rescue (SAR). A CAP Cessna-172 aircraft is stationed at Galena.

Heavy durable goods, such as oil, vehicles and building materials are transported by river barge in the summer.

The City of Galena, as a first-class city, operates various vital services such as water and sewer. The city also owns Nollner Health Clinic, operated by Tanana Chiefs Conference, a Native health clinic that offers 24-hour emergency care and routine health care. Eye and dental services are provided to residents on a visiting provider basis. Medical emergencies are stabilized at Nollner Clinic and flown by air ambulance to Fairbanks or Anchorage. Dire pediatric emergencies are flown to Seattle Children's Hospital.

Public radio station KIYU-FM, based in Galena, serves the city.

=== Energy ===
Galena's remote location, apart from Alaska's urban transportation and utility distribution networks, means that the city must transport and store fuel oil in large quantities. In 2004, the Galena City Council tentatively accepted a proposal from Toshiba Corporation to build the Galena Nuclear Power Plant, a small, self-contained nuclear power plant. In 2010, the plan was abandoned after local start-up costs to build a $27 million reactor core proved prohibitive for the community. The demonstration plant, the prototype for a line which Toshiba hoped to sell to similar communities in the U.S. and Canada, would have been the first civilian nuclear plant in Alaska; Fort Greely, Alaska, had a small military SM-4 reactor until the early 1970s. There is currently an attempt at a movement towards solar power for Galena, which would reduce energy costs.

== Sports ==
The Iditarod Trail Sled Dog Race goes through Galena (on even years), as does the Tesoro Iron Dog trans-Alaska snowmobile race. Galena is the halfway point of the Yukon 800, an annual summer speedboat race beginning in Fairbanks and taking place along the Tanana and Yukon Rivers.

Galena school sports include volleyball, cross-country running, basketball, swimming, skiing, and native youth Olympics (NYO).

The Galena High School boys' and girls' basketball teams were regional champions from 2004 to 2007. The boys' basketball team won the state championship in 2008.

== In popular culture ==
Frostbite, a character from the G.I. Joe 3.5" action figure toy line, is from Galena.

In the video game Metal Gear Solid, Colonel Campbell announces to Solid Snake that two F-16 fighter jets have been dispatched from Galena as part of a diversionary tactic. Galena also makes an appearance during the ending of Metal Gear Solid 3: Snake Eater.

In the 1983 film WarGames, USAF General Beringer, played by Barry Corbin, scrambles two fighter jets from Galena, AK to intercept two invading radar indicated bombers. The bombers are a computer projection, and once the fighters are within intercept range they disappear.
