= Koyukuk National Wildlife Refuge =

Conservation area in Alaska

- IUCN category IV (habitat/species management area)
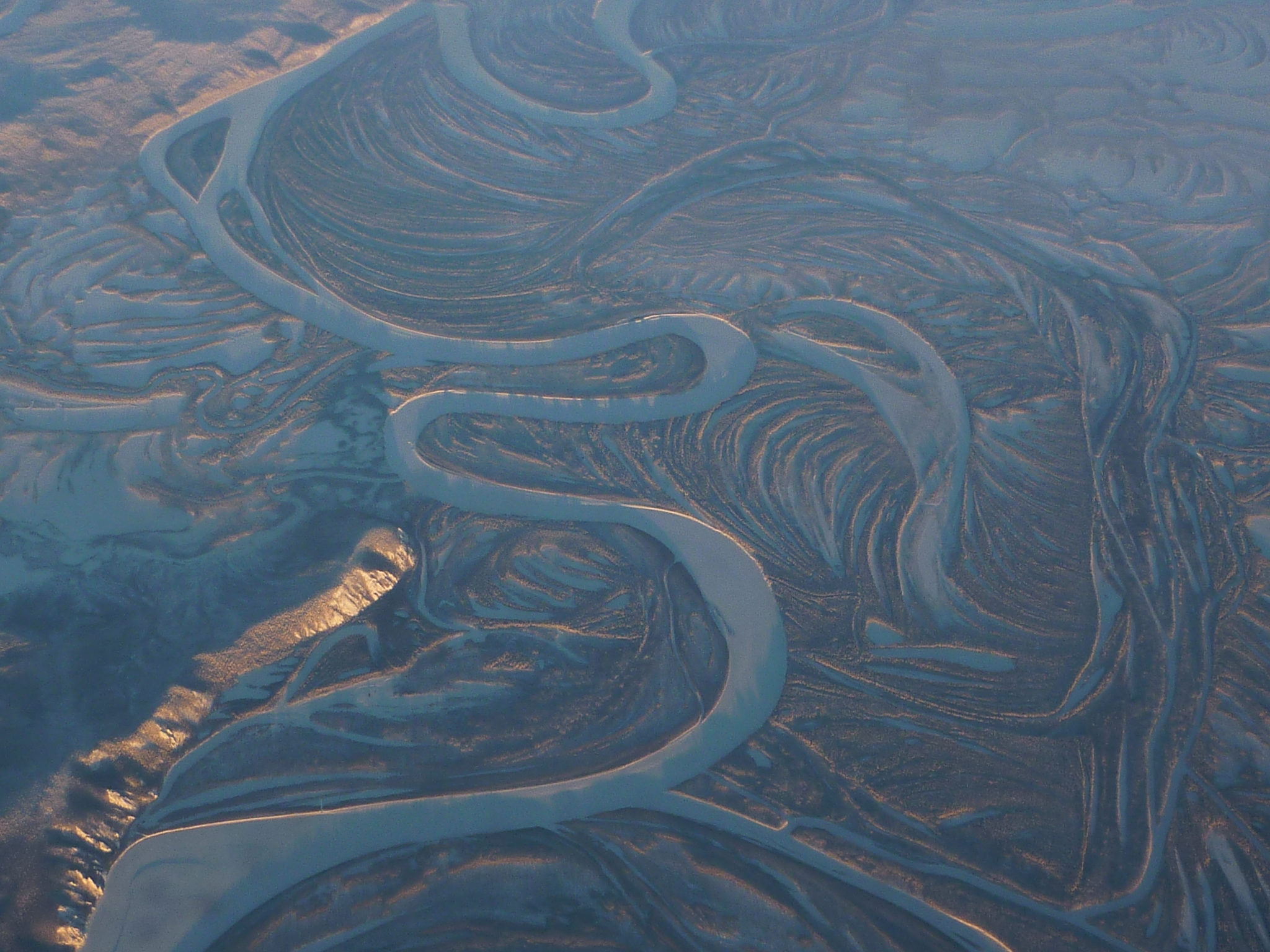
- Aerial view of the lower Koyukuk River floodplain

- Location within Alaska
- Location: Alaska, United States
- Nearest city: Galena, Alaska
- Coordinates: 65°35′00″N 157°14′26″W
- Area: 3,500,000 acres (14,000 km^{2})
- Established: 1980
- Governing body: U.S. Fish and Wildlife Service
- Website: Koyukuk NWR

The Koyukuk National Wildlife Refuge is a 3,500,000-acre (14,000 km^{2}) conservation area in Alaska. It lies within the floodplain of the Koyukuk River, in a basin that extends from the Yukon River to the Purcell Mountains and the foothills of the Brooks Range. This region of wetlands is home to fish, waterfowl, beaver and Alaskan moose, and wooded lowlands where two species of fox, bears, wolf packs, Canadian lynx and marten prowl.

The 750,000-acre (3,000 km^{2}) Northern Unit of the Innoko National Wildlife Refuge, commonly known as Kaiyuh Flats, is managed as part of the Koyukuk/Nowitna Refuge Complex. Rich in wetlands, the Northern Innoko is an extremely productive breeding area for migratory waterfowl and fish. The streams and rivers of the refuge complex support three species of salmon, Arctic grayling, sheefish, and many other fish species. Northern pike, especially those that winter in the shallow lakes of the Northern Innoko National Wildlife Refuge, sometimes grow to record size.

In the Koyukuk's wetlands, breeding waterfowl feast upon water plants and abundant protein-rich invertebrates. Young birds grow quickly in the short, lush summer, and prepare for the fall migration. As many as 100,000 ducks are hatched and raised on refuge lands during a single nesting season. Migratory songbirds and raptors also depend on the rich resources of the Koyukuk Refuge for breeding and raising young.

Koyukuk Refuge's Three-Day Slough area, part of the 400,000-acre (1,600 km^{2}) Koyukuk Wilderness, has some of the most productive moose habitat in Alaska. This region has, at times, supported more than 10 moose per square mile. Recent counts indicate that some areas still contain densities of five moose or more per square mile. As with much of the refuge big game work, these moose counts are cooperative efforts between the U.S. Fish and Wildlife Service and Alaska Department of Fish and Game.

Caribou from the migratory Western Arctic Herd, which numbers more than 450,000, often move into the northernmost reaches of the refuge in winter months in search of lichens that lie beneath the snow. The Koyukuk also supports a resident non-migratory caribou population, the Galena Mountain Herd, which numbers about 300. Wolf packs, Canadian lynx and other furbearers, as well as black and grizzly bears, are found on the refuge year around.

== See also ==
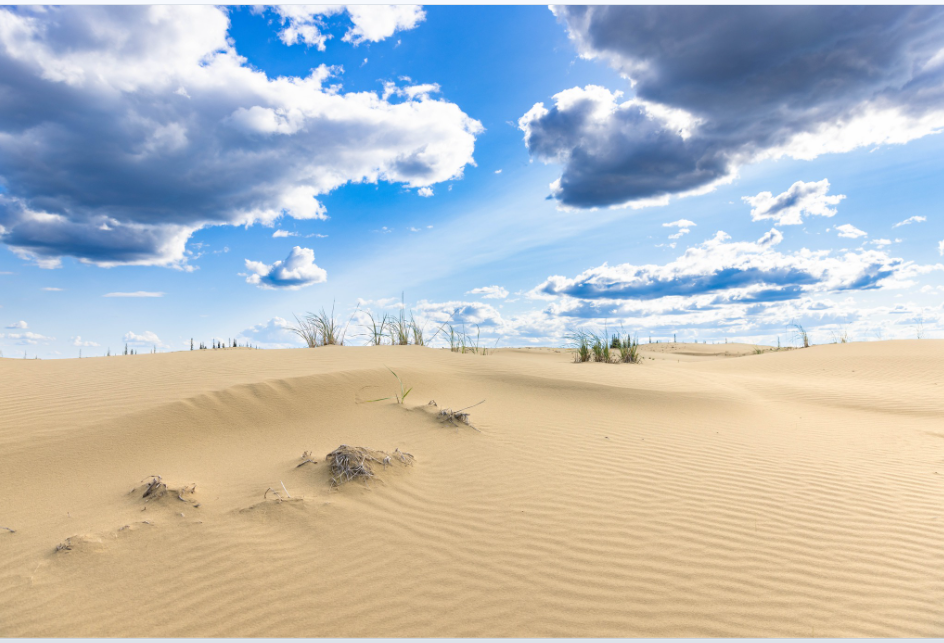
Nogahabara Sand Dunes

- List of largest National Wildlife Refuges
