= Ruby–Poorman mining district =

Mining district in Alaska

The Ruby–Poorman mining district in the U.S. state of Alaska produced nearly a half million ounces of gold, all from placer mines. Some of the largest gold nuggets found in Alaska are from the district, which lies along the Yukon River. The placers are mostly deeply buried, and most were originally worked with shafts and drifts. Dozens of creeks in the district were mined, many more bear gold prospects. Cassiterite, platinum, scheelite, allanite, and native bismuth have been recovered along with gold from placer mines in the district.

== Swift Creek ==
The largest gold nugget in Alaska (294.10 troy ounces) was found on Swift Creek in 1998.

== Ruby Creek ==
In 1907, the first placer gold discovered in the Ruby mining district was found on Ruby Creek. The town of Ruby is on the Yukon River at the mouth of Ruby Creek. About 970 ounces of gold were recovered from the creek.

== Bear Gulch ==
Gold was first discovered on Bear Gulch in 1910. Over 53,000 ounces of worn but not well-rounded gold were recovered from the creek, including a 100-ounce nugget.

== Long Creek ==
Gold was discovered on Long Creek in 1910. Seasonal mining was almost continuous until 1977, and continued intermittently in to 1993. Early work was done by underground drift mining, later work by open-cut methods, and by reworking old tailings.

A 46-troy ounce nugget, Alaska's 19th largest, was mined on Long Creek.

Total production through 1977 may exceed 76,000 ounces of gold: the largest nugget weighed 131 ounces and several other approximately 35-ounce nuggets were found. The tin-ore cassiterite was also recovered.

== Poorman Creek ==
After placer gold was discovered in 1912 along Poorman Creek mining was nearly continuous until about 1976, and resumed between 1998 and 1995. Most mining took place on bench claims on the north bank of the creek. The main pay streak is about 2 1/2 miles long and as much as 1,000 feet wide. Pyrite grains, polished cassiterite pebbles, amorphous cassiterite (wood tin), barite pebbles, and a little magnetite were recovered with the gold.

Possibly a quarter (approximately 98,000 ounces) of all the gold recovered from the Ruby district before 1960 came from Poorman Creek. Most work on Poorman Creek was done near to the town of Poorman.

Rhyolite porphyry (the host rock of Donlin and other important hardrock gold deposits) is reported to underlie the creek locally. Bedrock surrounding Poorman Creek is Paleozoic phyllite and quartzite, but the stream flows within 2 miles of the Poorman fault, a major tectonic feature juxtaposing Innoko terrane chert and slate with the Ruby terrane phyllite, quartzite, marble, limestone, and Tertiary volcanic rocks.

Many tributaries of Poorman Creek host prospects or mines.

== See also ==
- Gold mining in Alaska
- Placer mining
