= Yukon–Koyukuk Census Area, Alaska =

Census area in Alaska, United States

- Census area
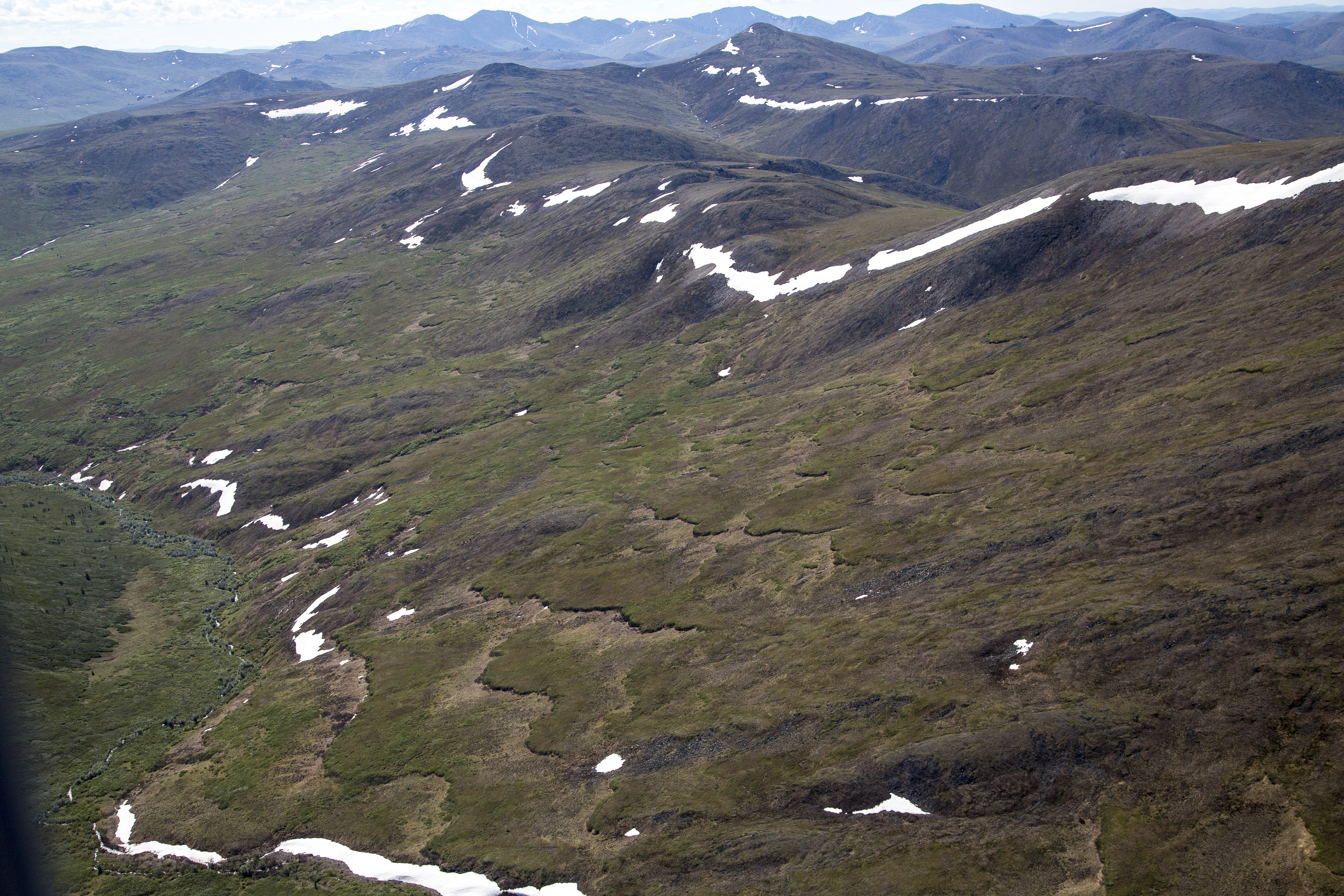
- White Mountains National Recreation Area

- Location within the U.S. state of Alaska
- Coordinates: 65°17′N 151°39′W
- Country: United States
- State: Alaska
- Established: 1980
- Named for: Yukon River and Koyukuk River
- Largest city: Galena

Area
  - Total: 147,842 sq mi (382,910 km^{2})
  - Land: 145,505 sq mi (376,860 km^{2})
  - Water: 2,300 sq mi (6,000 km^{2}) 1.6%

Population (2020)
  - Total: 5,343
  - Estimate (2025): 5,028 ▼
  - Density: 0.038/sq mi (0.015/km^{2})
- Time zone: UTC−9 (Alaska)
  - Summer (DST): UTC−8 (ADT)
- Congressional district: At-large

Yukon–Koyukuk Census Area (/ˈjuːkɒn ˈkaɪjəkək/ YOO-kon KY-yə-kək) is a census area in the U.S. state of Alaska. As of the 2020 census, the population was 5,343, down from 5,588 in 2010. With an area of 147,842.51 sq mi (382,910.3 km^{2}), it is the largest of any county or county-equivalent in the United States. While slightly larger than the entire state of Montana, the census area only consists of 22.2% of Alaska's total area. It is part of the unorganized borough of Alaska and therefore has no borough seat. Its largest communities are the cities of Galena, in the west, and Fort Yukon, in the northeast.

== Geography ==
According to the U.S. Census Bureau, the census area has 147,805 square miles (382,810 km^{2}), of which 145,505 square miles (376,860 km^{2}) is land and 2,300 square miles (6,000 km^{2}) (1.6%) is water. The area is slightly larger than the entire U.S. state of Montana, itself the fourth largest state, or the country of Japan, and makes up slightly more than 1/5 of the state of Alaska. The area is bigger than 47 of the other 49 states, with only California and Texas being bigger. Its population density, at 0.0449 inhabitants per square mile (0.0173/km^{2}), is the lowest in the United States.

=== Adjacent boroughs and census areas ===
- North Slope Borough, Alaska – north
- Southeast Fairbanks Census Area, Alaska – southeast
- Fairbanks North Star Borough, Alaska – southeast
- Denali Borough, Alaska – southeast
- Matanuska-Susitna Borough, Alaska – south
- Bethel Census Area, Alaska – south
- Kusilvak Census Area, Alaska – west
- Nome Census Area, Alaska – west
- Northwest Arctic Borough, Alaska – northwest
- Yukon Territory, Canada – east

=== National protected areas ===
- Arctic National Wildlife Refuge (part)
  - Mollie Beattie Wilderness (part)
- Gates of the Arctic National Park and Preserve (part)
  - Gates of the Arctic Wilderness (part)
- Innoko National Wildlife Refuge
  - Innoko Wilderness
- Kanuti National Wildlife Refuge
- Koyukuk National Wildlife Refuge (part)
  - Koyukuk Wilderness (part)
- Noatak National Preserve
- Nowitna National Wildlife Refuge
- Selawik National Wildlife Refuge (part)
  - Selawik Wilderness (part)
- Steese National Conservation Area
- White Mountains National Recreation Area
- Yukon–Charley Rivers National Preserve (part)
- Yukon Flats National Wildlife Refuge

== Demographics ==
Historical population
Census	Pop.	Note	%±
1960	4,097		—
1970	4,752		16.0%
1980	7,873		65.7%
1990	8,478		7.7%
2000	6,551		−22.7%
2010	5,588		−14.7%
2020	5,343		−4.4%
2025 (est.)	5,028	▼	−5.9%
U.S. Decennial Census; 1790–1960 1900–1990; 1990–2000 2010–2020

=== 2020 census ===
As of the 2020 census, the county had a population of 5,343. The median age was 37.9 years. 26.7% of residents were under the age of 18 and 14.9% of residents were 65 years of age or older. For every 100 females there were 113.0 males, and for every 100 females age 18 and over there were 114.1 males.

The racial makeup of the county was 21.1% White, 0.1% Black or African American, 71.7% American Indian and Alaska Native, 0.1% Asian, 0.1% Native Hawaiian and Pacific Islander, 0.5% from some other race, and 6.3% from two or more races. Hispanic or Latino residents of any race comprised 1.3% of the population.

0.0% of residents lived in urban areas, while 100.0% lived in rural areas.

There were 2,194 households in the county, of which 30.9% had children under the age of 18 living with them and 26.1% had a female householder with no spouse or partner present. About 37.2% of all households were made up of individuals and 12.8% had someone living alone who was 65 years of age or older.

There were 4,014 housing units, of which 45.3% were vacant. Among occupied housing units, 72.8% were owner-occupied and 27.2% were renter-occupied. The homeowner vacancy rate was 2.9% and the rental vacancy rate was 10.6%.

Yukon–Koyukuk Census Area, Alaska – Racial and ethnic composition Note: the US Census treats Hispanic/Latino as an ethnic category. This table excludes Latinos from the racial categories and assigns them to a separate category. Hispanics/Latinos may be of any race.
Race / Ethnicity (NH = Non-Hispanic)	Pop 1980	Pop 1990	Pop 2000	Pop 2010	Pop 2020	% 1980	% 1990	% 2000	% 2010	% 2020
White alone (NH)	3,255	3,538	1,574	1,218	1,121	41.34%	41.73%	24.03%	21.80%	20.98%
Black or African American alone (NH)	117	88	6	9	6	1.49%	1.04%	0.09%	0.16%	0.11%
Native American or Alaska Native alone (NH)	4,366	4,719	4,610	3,967	3,818	55.46%	55.66%	70.37%	70.99%	71.46%
Asian alone (NH)	21	50	23	14	8	0.27%	0.59%	0.35%	0.25%	0.15%
Native Hawaiian or Pacific Islander alone (NH)	x	x	3	6	3	x	x	0.05%	0.11%	0.06%
Other race alone (NH)	24	1	10	2	16	0.30%	0.01%	0.15%	0.04%	0.30%
Mixed race or Multiracial (NH)	x	x	247	306	299	x	x	3.77%	5.48%	5.60%
Hispanic or Latino (any race)	90	82	78	66	72	1.14%	0.97%	1.19%	1.18%	1.35%
Total	7,873	8,478	6,551	5,588	5,343	100.00%	100.00%	100.00%	100.00%	100.00%

Top Ten Most Self-Reported Ancestries in Yukon–Koyukuk Census Area (American Community Survey 2020 five year estimates)
Ancestry	Percentage of Population
Alaskan Athabaskan	65.52%
German	9.27%
Irish	3.39%
Iñupiat	3.00%
Alaska Native tribes, not specified	2.58%
English	2.56%
Scottish	2.05%
Norwegian	1.85%
Yup'ik	1.75%
Mexican	1.68%
Russian	1.66%

=== 2000 census ===
At the 2000 census there were 6,551 people, 2,309 households, and 1,480 families residing in the census area. The population density was 22.3 square miles (57.7km^{2}) per person. It is the least densely populated county-equivalent of all 3,141 county-equivalents of the United States. There were 3,917 housing units at an average density of 0.027 per square mile (0.010/km^{2}). The racial makeup of the census area was 24.27% White, 0.09% Black or African American, 70.89% Native American, 0.37% Asian, 0.05% Pacific Islander, 0.43% from other races, and 3.91% from two or more races. 1.19% were Hispanic or Latino of any race. 12.95% reported speaking an Athabaskan language at home; of these 35.26% spoke Gwich'in and 10.94% Koyukon.

Of the 2,309 households, 38.90% had children under the age of 18 living with them, 36.90% were married couples living together, 16.90% had a female householder with no husband present, and 35.90% were non-families. 30.50% of households were one person and 6.20% were one person aged 65 or older. The average household size was 2.81 and the average family size was 3.53.

The age distribution was 35.00% under the age of 18, 8.70% from 18 to 24, 26.90% from 25 to 44, 22.10% from 45 to 64, and 7.30% 65 or older. The median age was 31 years. For every 100 females, there were 118.60 males. For every 100 females age 18 and over, there were 122.60 males.

== Communities ==
=== Cities ===
- Allakaket
- Anvik
- Bettles
- Fort Yukon
- Galena
- Grayling
- Holy Cross
- Hughes
- Huslia
- Kaltag
- Koyukuk
- McGrath
- Nenana
- Nikolai
- Nulato
- Ruby
- Shageluk
- Tanana

=== Census-designated places ===
- Alatna
- Arctic Village
- Beaver
- Birch Creek
- Central
- Chalkyitsik
- Circle
- Coldfoot
- Evansville
- Flat
- Four Mile Road
- Lake Minchumina
- Livengood
- Manley Hot Springs
- Minto
- Rampart
- Stevens Village
- Takotna
- Venetie
- Wiseman

== Education ==
School districts include:

- Alaska Gateway School District
- Galena City School District
- Iditarod Area School District
- Nenana City School District
- Tanana City School District
- Yukon Flats School District
- Yukon–Koyukuk School District

== Politics ==
Like other areas of the sparse Alaskan Bush with large Alaska Native majorities, the Yukon–Koyukuk Census Area often favors the Democratic Party relative to the state as a whole. Though it voted Republican in all presidential elections in the 2000s, it has supported the Democrats more recently by nearly 30-point margins.

United States presidential election results for Yukon–Koyukuk Census Area, Alaska
Year	Republican		Democratic		Third party(ies)	
Year	No.	%	No.	%	No.	%
1960	1,067	49.58%	1,085	50.42%	0	0.00%
1964	736	29.61%	1,750	70.39%	0	0.00%
1968	1,439	49.30%	1,173	40.18%	307	10.52%
1972	835	48.29%	797	46.10%	97	5.61%
1976	1,043	51.28%	860	42.28%	131	6.44%
1980	943	38.60%	1,070	43.80%	430	17.60%
1984	1,932	64.98%	951	31.99%	90	3.03%
1988	1,421	56.48%	959	38.12%	136	5.41%
1992	1,039	35.68%	1,080	37.09%	793	27.23%
1996	887	33.79%	1,357	51.70%	381	14.51%
2000	1,357	47.80%	1,138	40.08%	344	12.12%
2004	1,987	59.38%	1,215	36.31%	144	4.30%
2008	1,528	52.40%	1,292	44.31%	96	3.29%
2012	812	33.99%	1,472	61.62%	105	4.40%
2016	789	30.33%	1,405	54.02%	407	15.65%
2020	925	36.27%	1,480	58.04%	145	5.69%
2024	851	35.80%	1,386	58.31%	140	5.89%

== See also ==
- List of airports in Yukon–Koyukuk Census Area
- Crow Lake (Alaska)
