= Innoko National Wildlife Refuge =

National wildlife refuge in Alaska, USA

- IUCN category IV (habitat/species management area)
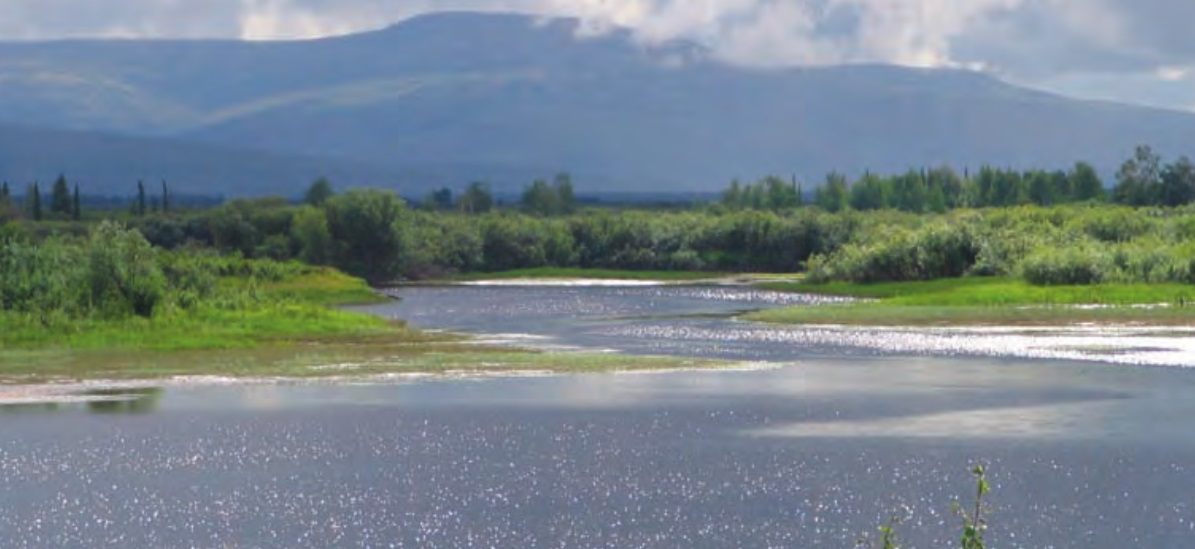
- Kaiyuh Flats

- Location within Alaska
- Location: Yukon-Koyukuk Census Area, Alaska, United States
- Nearest city: McGrath, Alaska
- Coordinates: 63°20′N 158°25′W
- Area: 3,850,481 acres (15,582.34 km^{2})
- Established: December 2, 1980
- Governing body: U.S. Fish and Wildlife Service
- Website: innoko.fws.gov

The Innoko National Wildlife Refuge is a national wildlife refuge of the United States located in western Alaska. It consists of 3,850,481 acres (15,582 km^{2}), of which 1,240,000 acres (5,018 km^{2}) is designated a wilderness area. It is the fifth-largest national wildlife refuge in the United States. The refuge is administered from offices in Galena.

The refuge was established in 1980 by the Alaska National Interest Lands Conservation Act. The northern part of the refuge, called Kaiyuh Flats, is adjacent to the Yukon River southwest of Galena. It contains 751,000 acres (3,040 km^{2}). The southern part contains approximately 3,099,000 acres (12,540 km^{2}) of land surrounding the Innoko River. The land is swampy and is the nesting area for hundreds of thousands of birds including ospreys, northern hawk-owls, trumpeter swans, bald eagles, common ravens, short-eared owls, and red-tailed hawks. Mammalian species that habitat this refuge are brown and black bears, moose, wolves, Canadian lynx, marten, porcupine, beaver, caribou, river otter, red fox, wolverine, muskrat, and mink.

The refuge has no road access from outside and contains no roads. Air access can be arranged in McGrath.

== Gallery ==
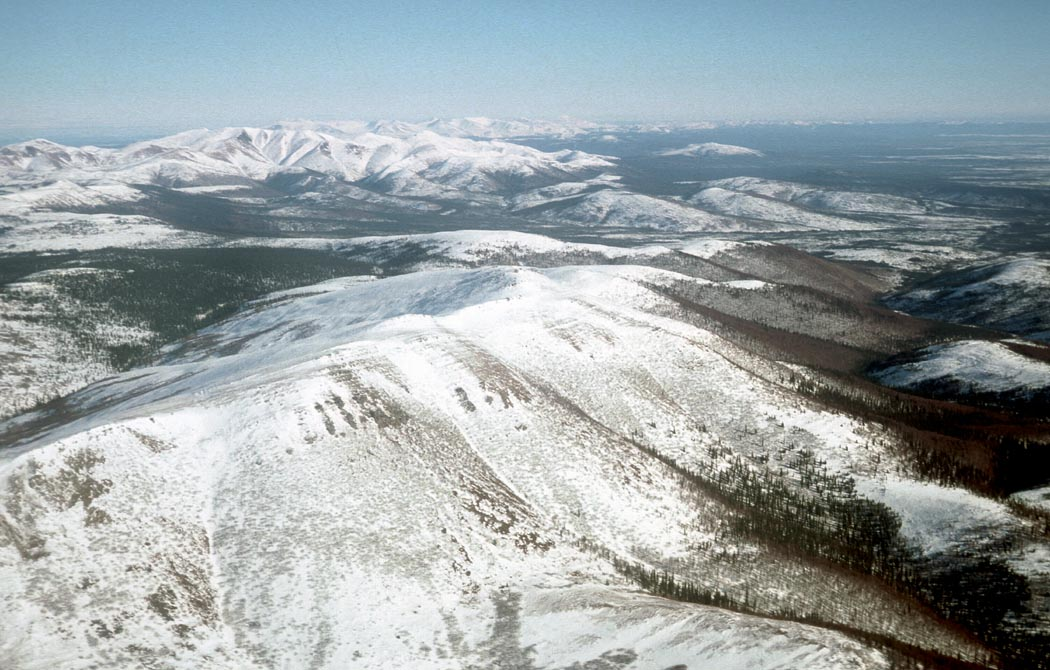
Mountains

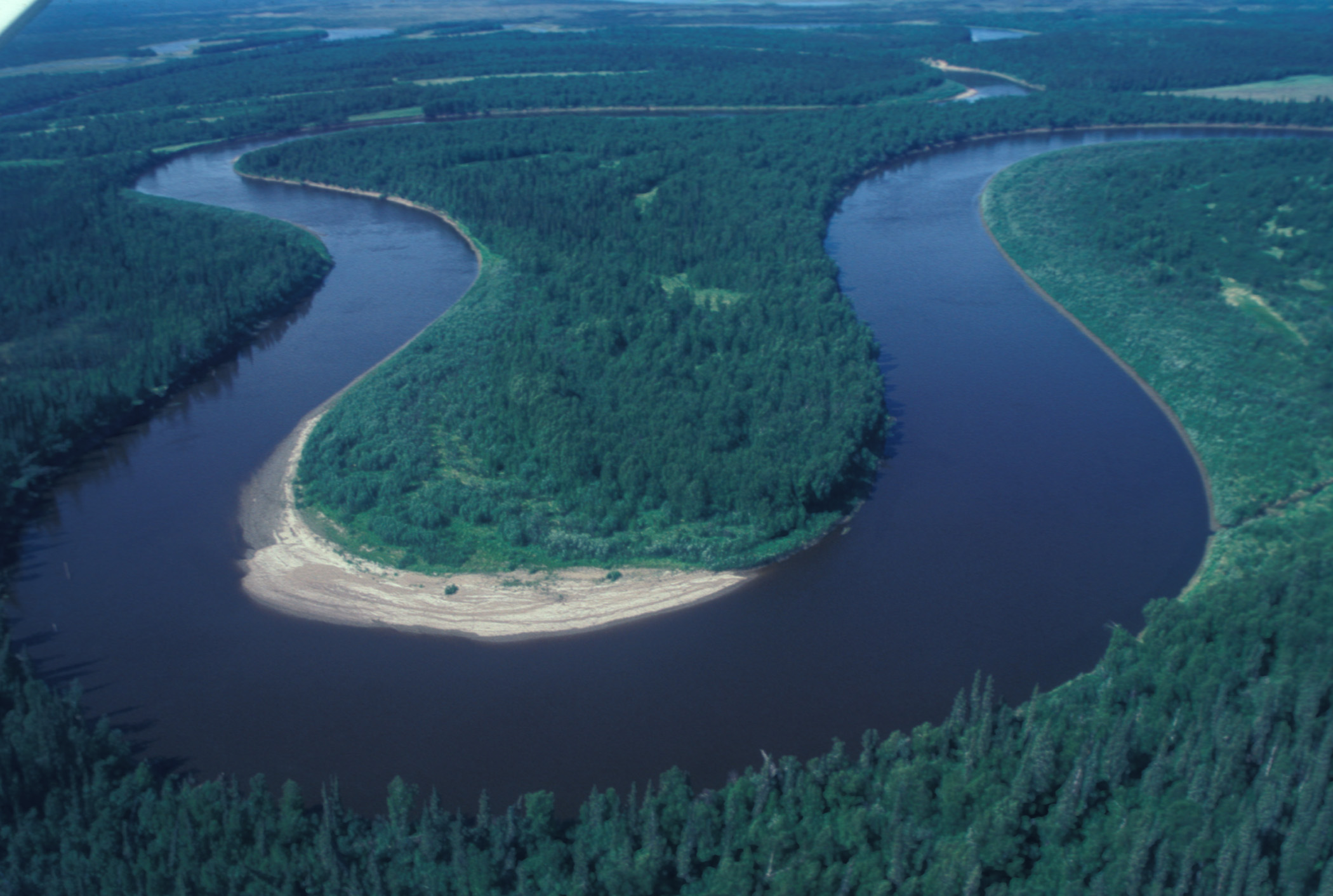
River

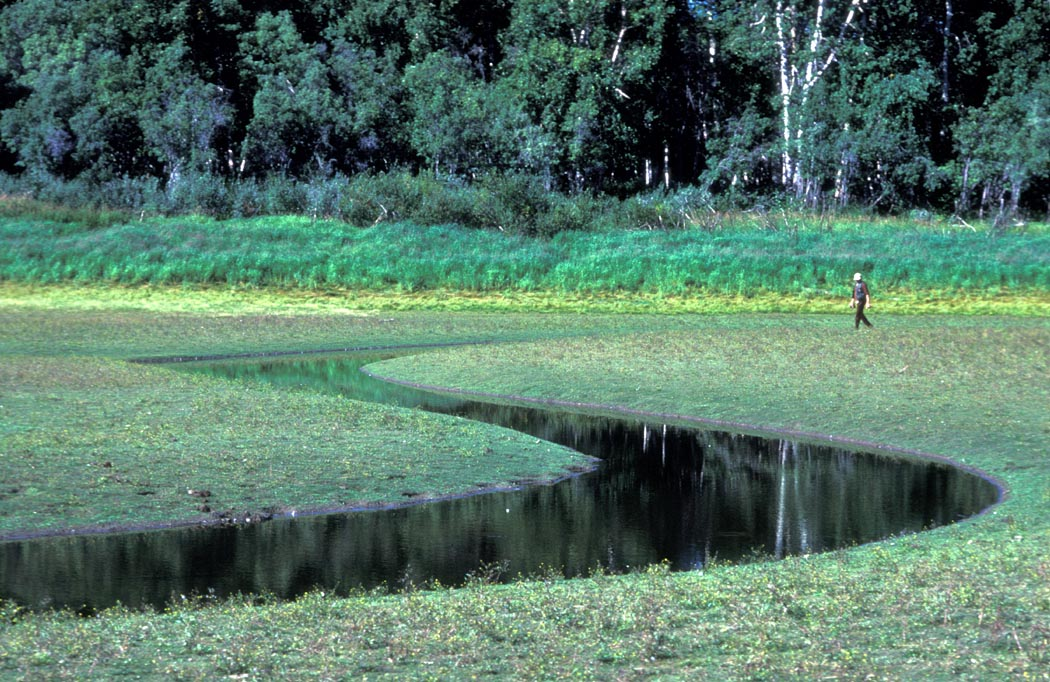
Wetlands

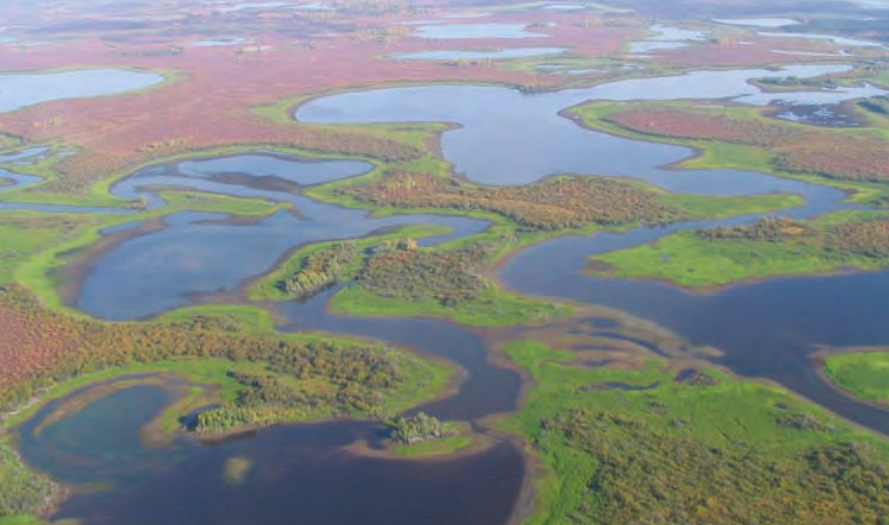
Aerial view
