= Tanana Athabaskans =

Alaskan Athabaskan peoples

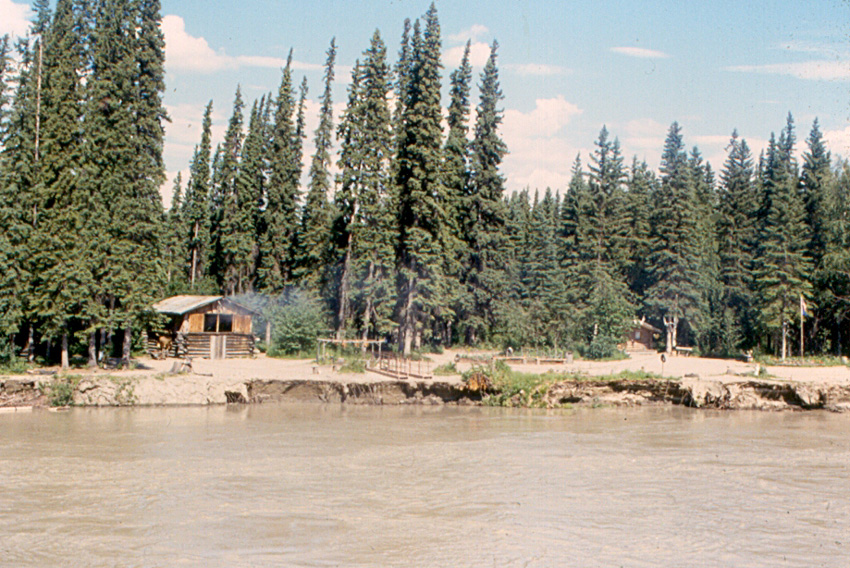
- Tanana River and Lower Tanana Athabaskan fish camp in the Chena, Alaska, June 1997.

Total population
- 900; Lower & Middle Tanana: 400; Tanacross: 200; Upper Tanana: 300

Regions with significant populations
- United States (Alaska) (majority); Canada (Yukon) (minority)

Languages
- Upper Tanana, Lower Tanana, Tanacross, American Indian English (Alaskan variant),

Religion
- Shamanism (largely ex), Christianity

Related ethnic groups
- Other Alaskan Athabaskans; Especially Upper Kuskokwim

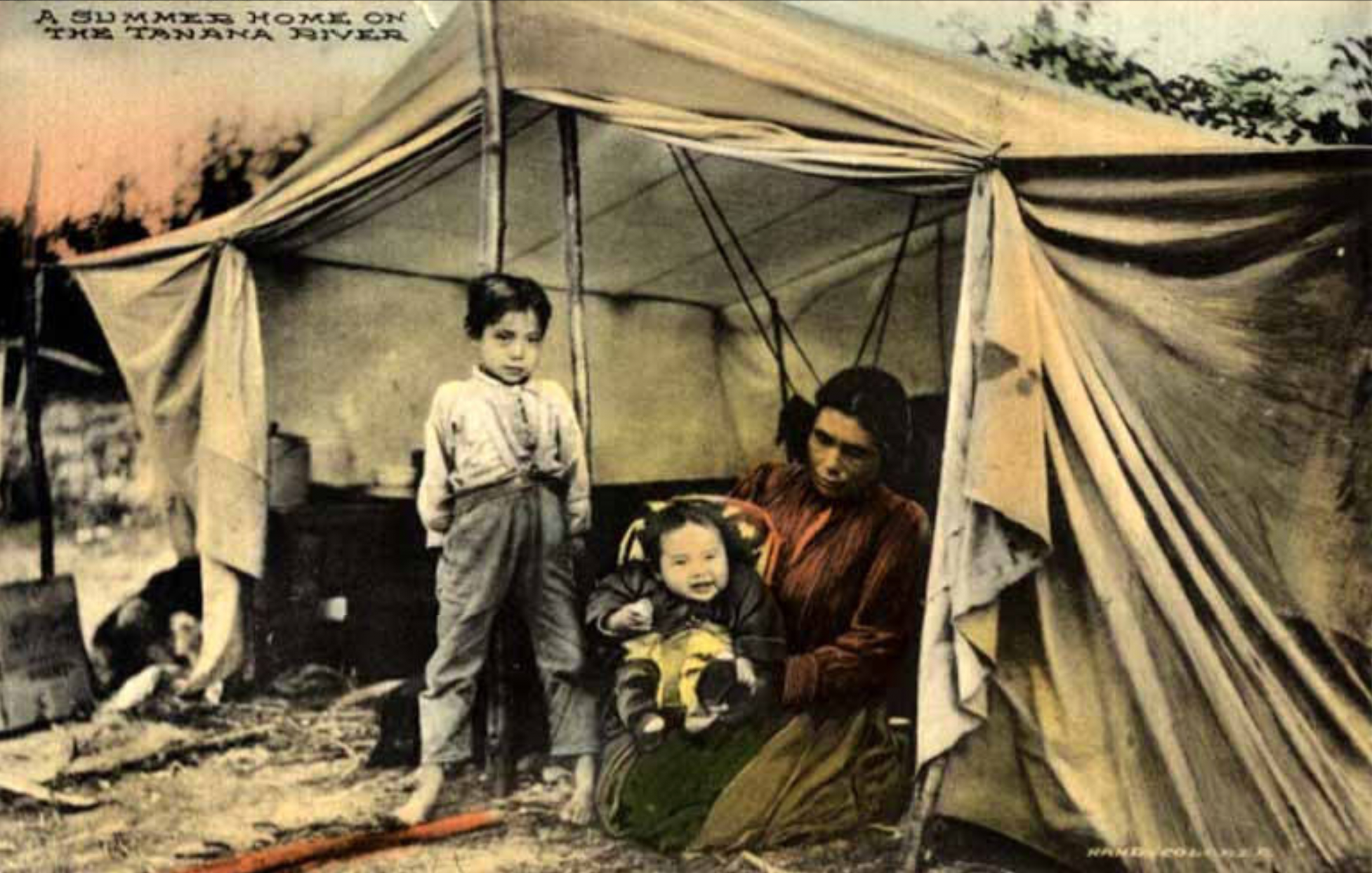
Postcard with Tanana family

The Tanana Athabaskans, Tanana Athabascans, or Tanana Athapaskans are an Alaskan Athabaskan people from the Athabaskan-speaking ethnolinguistic group. They are the original inhabitants of the Tanana River (in Tanana languages Tth'itu', literally 'straight water,' in Koyukon language Tene No', literally 'trail water') drainage basin in east-central Alaska Interior, United States and a little part (White River First Nation) lived in Yukon, Canada. Tanana River Athabaskan peoples are called in Lower Tanana and Koyukon language Ten Hʉt'ænæ (literally 'trail people'), in Gwich'in language Tanan Gwich'in (literally 'people of Tanana River'). In Alaska, where they are the oldest, there are three or four groups identified by the languages they speak. These are the Tanana proper or Lower Tanana (Kokht'ana) and/or Middle Tanana, Tanacross or Tanana Crossing (Koxt'een), and Upper Tanana (Kohtʼiin). The Tanana Athabaskan culture is a hunter-gatherer culture with a matrilineal system. Tanana Athabaskans were semi-nomadic and lived in semi-permanent settlements in the Tanana Valley lowlands. Traditional Athabaskan land use includes fall hunting of moose, caribou, Dall sheep, and small terrestrial animals, as well as trapping. The Athabaskans did not have any formal tribal organization. Tanana Athabaskans were strictly territorial and used hunting and gathering practices in their semi-nomadic way of life and dispersed habitation patterns. Each small band of 20–40 people normally had a central winter camp with several seasonal hunting and fishing camps, and they moved cyclically, depending on the season and availability of resources.

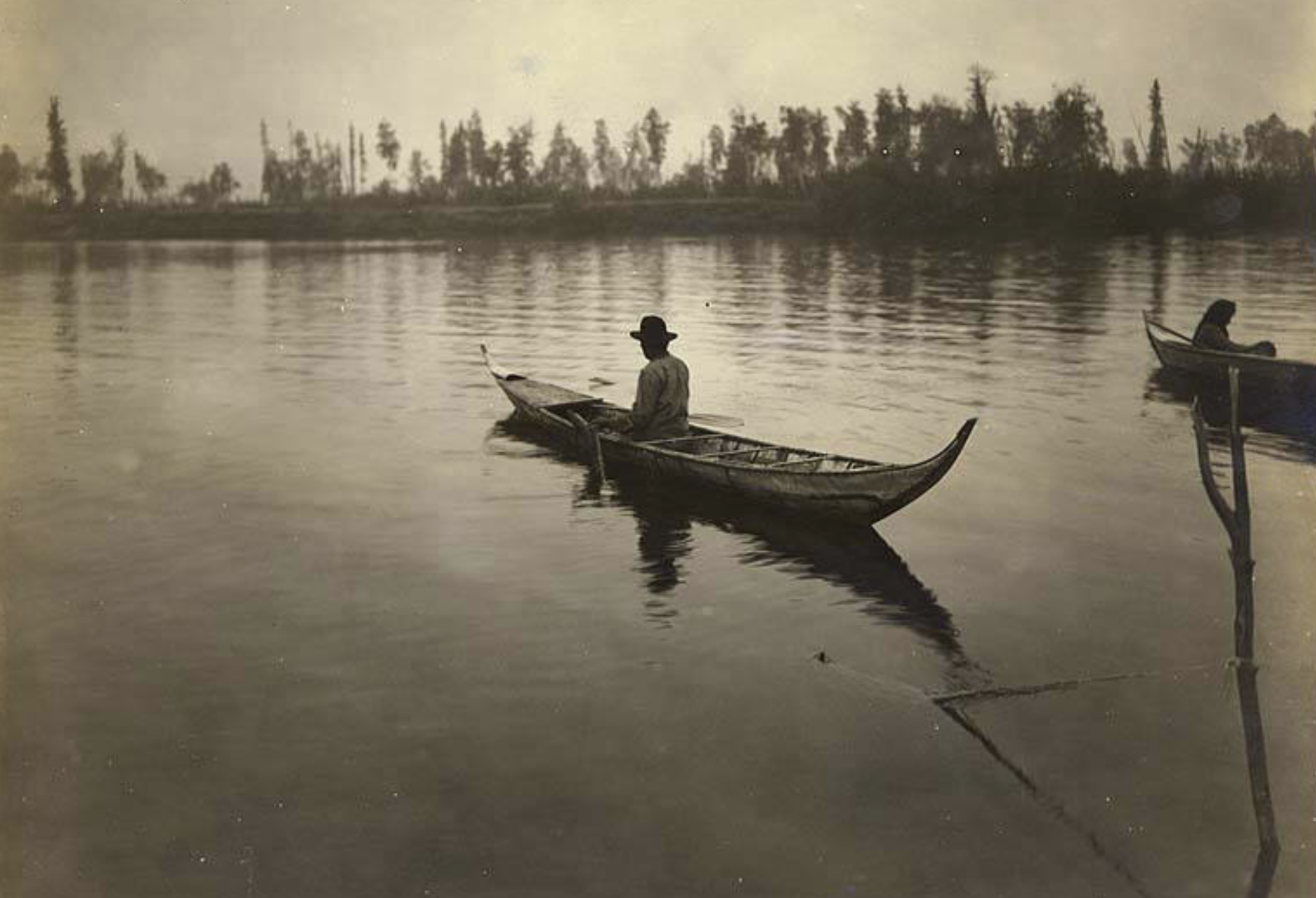
Tanana man in canoe (1914)

Their neighbors are other Athabaskan-speaking peoples: in Alaska, Koyukon (north and northwest), Gwich'in (north and northeast), Hän (northeast), Dena'ina (a little part of the southwest), and Ahtna (south); in Canada Hän (northeast) and Northern and Southern Tutchone (east). The language of the Upper Kuskokwim people is more closely related to the Lower Tanana language, but not neighbor.

== Bands ==
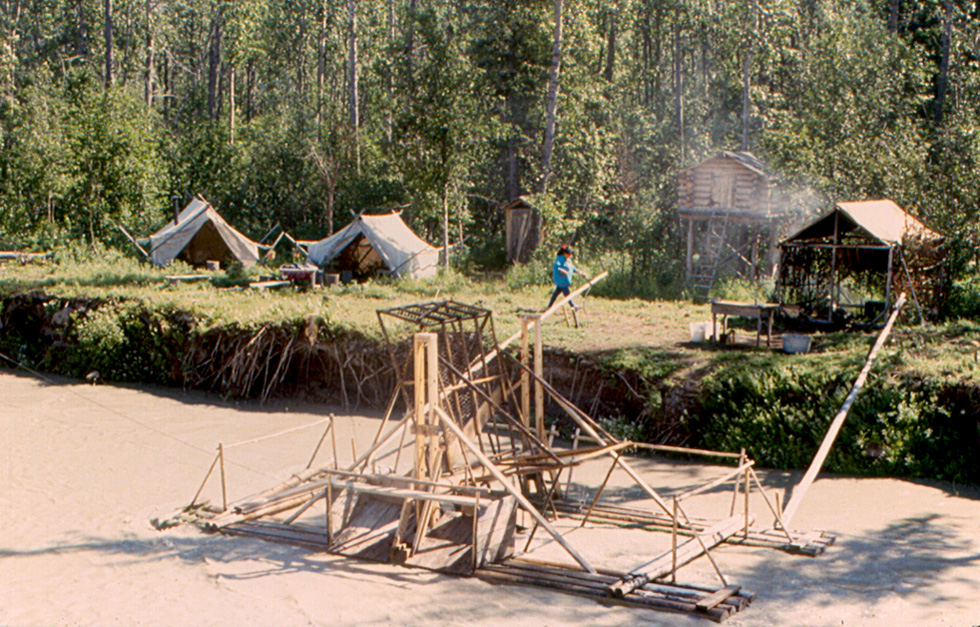
Fish wheel into the Tanana River (Tthʼituʼ) and Lower Tanana fish camp, 1997

The homeland of the Tanana Athabaskan people can be generally divided into four distinct sections. 1) the Yukon Tanana upland draining to the Tanana River, 2) the Northway-Tanacross Lowlands, 3) the Eastern Alaskan range draining into the Tanana River, and 4) the Northern foothills.

The Goodpaster River, a 91-mile (146 km) tributary of the Tanana River, is considered to be a natural break in the Tanana Athabaskan language area, separating upriver speakers of the Tanacross and Upper Tanana languages from the Lower (and Middle) Tanana speakers living farther downriver.

The Tanana Athabaskans have a system of matrilineal kinship. The Athabaskans loosely recognized membership in a larger bilateral group called the regional band (or dialect group), but the more important social unit was the local band (or family group or family/hunting units). In the winter, the regional band might split up into smaller units, called local bands, each one made up of perhaps four nuclear families. The regional band might meet again at a predetermined place and time in mid-winter for a gathering ceremony called a potlatch and then split up again for beaver and muskrat trapping.

At the end of the 19th century there were twelve regional bands living in the Tanana Athabaskan homeland: six downriver bands (four Lower Tanana and two Middle Tanana) and six upriver bands (two Tanacross and four Upper Tanana).

=== Lower Tanana ===
The Lower Tanana regional bands: (language: proper dialect of Lower Tanana)

- Minto band or Minto Flats band – inhabiting the Minto Flats and Old Minto (Menhti Xwghottthit) area. Neighbors: Gwich'in people (north), Koyukon people (west), Nenana-Toklat band (southwest), Wood River band (southeast), Chena band (east).
- Nenana-Toklat band – inhabiting the Nenana River (Nina No'), Nenana Valley and Toklat River (Tootl'o Huno') area. Neighbors: Koyukon people (west), Dena'ina people (south), Minto band (north), Wood River band (east).
- Wood River band – inhabiting the Wood River area. Neighbors: Dena'ina people (south), Nenana-Toklat band (west), Minto and Chena bands (north), Salcha band (east).
- Chena band — inhabiting the Chena River and Chena Village (Chʼenoʼ) area (also formerly Fairbanks area). Neighbors: Gwich'in people (north), Minto band (west), Salcha band (east).

=== Middle Tanana ===
The Middle Tanana regional bands: (language: extinct (1993) separate dialect of Lower Tanana. Some authors consider the Salcha-Goodpaster dialect of Lower Tanana to be a distinct language known as Middle Tanana. Linguist James Kari has been a strong advocate for Middle Tanana, referring to the former language of the Salcha-Goodpaster bands along the middle Tanana River)

- Salcha(ket) band – inhabiting the Salcha River (Sol Chaget) area. Neighbors: Hän people (northeast), Ahtna people (south), Chena band (north), Wood River band (west), Delta-Goodpaster band (east).
- (Big) Delta-Goodpaster band – inhabiting the Big Delta, Delta River (incl. Delta Junction and Deltana) and Goodpaster River (Jiiz Cheeg) area. Neighbors: Hän people (northeast), Ahtna people (south), Salcha band (north and west), Healy River-Joseph band (east).

=== Tanacross ===
The Tanacross (Tanana Crossing; first documented by Ferdinand von Wrangel in 1839 as Copper River Kolchan) regional bands: (language: Tanacross)

- Healy River-Joseph band – inhabiting the formerly Joseph Village (Tehłuug Ninhdeex Ndiig), Healy Lake (Mendees Cheeg), Lake George (Nxaal Měnn'), Sam Lake (official United States Geological Survey name is Sand Lake – Ch'inchedl Měnn') area. Neighbors: Delta-Goodpaster band (west), Hän people (north), Ahtna people (south), Mansfeld-Kechumstuk band (west), Healy River-Joseph band (east).
- Mansfeld-Kechumstuk band — inhabiting nowadays Tanacross (Taats'altęy) and Dot Lake (Kelt'aaddh Menn'), formerly Ketchumsuk (Saagéscheeg), Mosquito Fork, Lake Mansfield (Dihthâad Měnn'), Mansfield Hill (Mesiin Tsiitsʼiig), Old Mansfield Village (Ch'enaa Ndêdh), Mansfield Village (Dihthâad), Robertson River (Nįhtsiił Ndiig), Tok River (Tth'iitiy Nda'), Tok area. Neighbors: Healy River-Joseph band (west), Hän people (north), Ahtna people (south), Tetlin-Last Tetlin band (east).
  - Dihthâad Xtʼeen Iin ('Mansfield area people')
  - Yaadóg Xtʼeen Iin ('Ketchumstuck people', lit. 'inland area people').

=== Upper Tanana ===
The Upper Tanana regional bands: (language: Upper Tanana)

- Tetlin-Last Tetlin band – formerly inhabiting the Tetlin (Teetłaiy), Last Tetlin (Nah K'and) and Tetlin Lake area (nowadays Tetlin). Neighbors: Mansfeld-Kechumstuk band (west), Hän people (north), Ahtna people (south), Lower Nabesna band (east).
- Lower Nabesna band — formerly inhabiting the Northway, Jol, Nabesna Village, Gardiner Creek (Cheejil Niign), Nabesna River (lower), Chisana River (lower) area (nowadays Northway). Neighbors: Tetlin-Last Tetlin band (west), Hän people (north), Ahtna people (south), Scottie Creek band (east).
- Scottie Creek band — formerly inhabiting the Scottie Creek area (nowadays in Alaska Northway; in Canada Whitehorse, Yukon and Beaver Creek, Yukon, called as White River First Nation). Neighbors: Lower Nabesna band (west), Hän people (north), Ahtna people (south), Northern Tutchone people of Canada (east).
- Upper Nabesna-Upper Chisana/Upper Chisana-Upper Nabesna band (own name Ddhał Tot iin 'among the mountain people') – formerly inhabiting the Nabesna, Nabesna River (upper), Chisana River (upper), Cross Creek (Nach'etay Cheeg), Chisana area (nowadays Northway, Mentasta, Chistochina). Neighbors: Ahtna people (west), other Upper Tanana bands (north), Southern Tutchone people of Canada (east).

== Prehistory ==
Archaeological sites in Alaska (East Beringia) are where some of the earliest evidence has been found of Paleo-Indians. Alaska Interior or Interior Alaska has been continuously inhabited for the last 14,000 ~ 12,000 years, and evidence of this continuum of human (ancestors of the Athabaskans) activity is preserved within and around Fort Wainwright's training lands. Interior Alaska's icefree status during the last glacial period provided a corridor connecting the Bering Land Bridge and northeastern Asia (West Beringia/Siberia) to North America. The earliest cultural remains in interior Alaska, as on the coast, are chipped stone blade complexes about 10,000 years old, with close relationships to Siberian materials. In February 2008, a proposal connecting Asiatic Yeniseian languages of central Siberia to American Na-Dené languages (Athabaskan–Eyak–Tlingit) into a Dené–Yeniseian family was published and well received by a number of linguists. The homeland of the Athabaskan languages is northwestern Canada and southern/eastern Alaska.

After initial colonization, archaeologists generally divide Interior Alaska's prehistory into three broad archaeological themes:

=== Paleo-Arctic tradition ===
Paleo-Arctic tradition (12,000–6,000 years ago) is a term now generally used by archaeologists to refer to the earliest settled people known from all over Alaska. In Interior Alaska, Paleo-Arctic tradition historically included two cultural divisions called the Nenana and Denali complexes.

==== Nenana complex ====
The Nenana complex was defined by W. R. Powers and John F. Hoffecker. The Nenana complex began approximately 11,000 years ago. It is widely regarded as part of the Palaeoindian tradition and a likely Beringian progenitor of the Clovis Complex. Many Nenana Complex archaeological sites are located in the Tanana Valley: Broken Mammoth, Chugwater, Donnelly Ridge, Healy Lake, Mead, and Swan Point.

==== Denali complex ====
The Denali complex, dated roughly to 10,500 to 8,000 years ago, was originally defined by F. H West. Some Denali Complex archaeological sites: Mt. Hayes, Swan Point, and Gerstle River. Both Nenana and Denali technology persist in central Alaska throughout the Holocene. The relationship between the proposed Nenana and Denali complexes is, as of yet, unresolved. The boreal forest in Interior Alaska (Interior Alaska-Yukon lowland taiga of Tanana region and Copper Plateau taiga of Ahtna region) was established 8,000 years ago.

Two ice-age infants discovered at an ancient residential campsite (Upward Sun River site was first discovered in 2006) in Interior Alaska near the Tanana River east of Fairbanks are the oldest human remains ever found in the North American Arctic and Subarctic, and among the oldest discovered on the entire continent, according to researchers with the University of Alaska Fairbanks. Discovered in 2013, the remains of the two infants date from 11,500 years ago, near the end of the last ice age.

=== Northern Archaic tradition ===
The Northern Archaic tradition flourished 6,000–1,000 years ago. Site density increased again after about 6,000 years ago in Interior Alaska. This population increase coincides roughly with the Northern Archaic Tradition and the appearance of side-notched projectile points. Douglas D. Anderson originally defined the Northern Archaic Tradition to specifically address notched point-bearing stratigraphic horizons that did not contain microblades at the Onion Portage site (Onion Portage Archeological District of Kobuk Malimiut tribes of Inupiat people region) in northern Alaska. Notched point assemblages occur in many sites in Interior Alaska, including over one dozen on the U.S. Army's Fort Wainwright lands. Several sites, including the excavated Banjo Lake site in Donnelly Training Area, have also produced middle Holocene dates from hearth charcoal. The 6,300- to 6,700-year-old dates from Banjo Lake were also associated with a microblade component.

=== Athabascan tradition ===
The Athabaskan tradition flourished 1,300–800 years ago. Linguistic evidence suggests that the Athabaskan culture may have appeared in the Tanana Valley as early as 2,500 years ago. Through ethnography, oral history, and a broad array of cultural items, much has been learned about Athabaskan culture and history in the region. Artifacts associated with the Athabaskan culture are exceptionally diverse and include bone and antler projectile points, fishhooks, beads, buttons, birch bark trays, and bone gaming pieces. In the Upper Tanana region, native copper (from trading with Ahtna people or "Copper Indians") was available and used in addition to the traditional material types to manufacture tools such as knives, projectile points, awls, ornaments, and axes. A late prehistoric Athabaskan occupation is recognized at several sites in and around U.S. Army Garrison, Fort Wainwright's training lands. The Athabaskan Tradition includes late prehistoric and proto-historic cultures generally believed to be the ancestors of Athabascan tribes who currently inhabit Interior Alaska. Excavated Athabaskan sites are rare, but the limited body of evidence allows for several generalizations. Athabascan settlement patterns depended greatly on the availability of subsistence resources, and Interior bands lived a nomadic lifestyle.

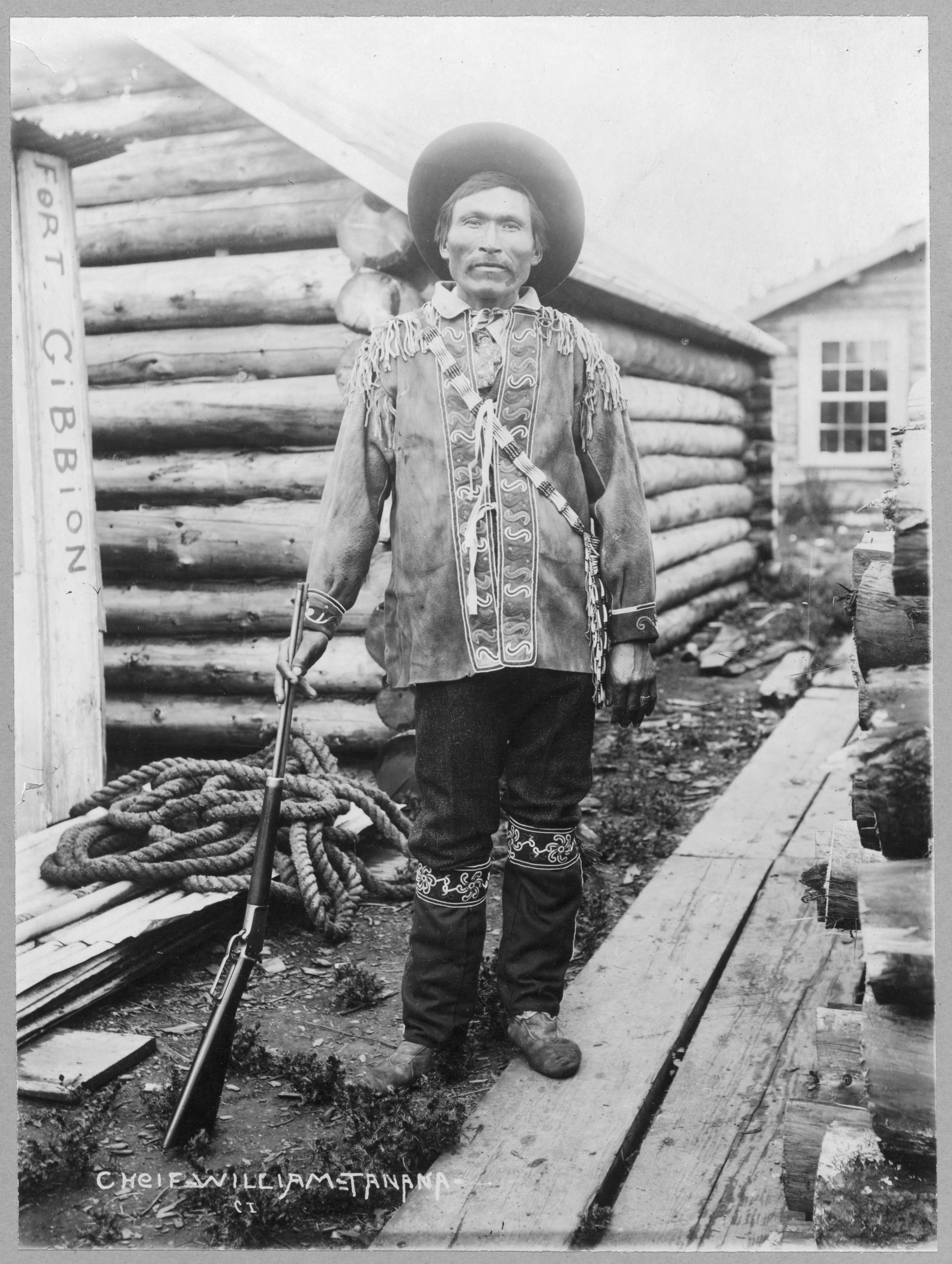
Tanana chief in 1916

== History ==
Ernest S. Burch (1980) defined a four-period scheme reflecting the major historical events and their impact on the Alaska Natives (Alaskan Eskimos and Athabaskan peoples):

1. The Early Historic period (1816–1838) is the earliest contact with natives that can be reckoned from the explorative coastal expedition of James Cook in 1778.
2. The Fragmentation period (1838–1897) saw far-reaching disruption and change in traditional native subsistence and settlement patterns.
3. The Colonial period (1898–1960) is marked by the abrupt influx of large numbers of non-native peoples during the gold rush era.
4. The Native Claims period (1960–1977) is pre and post Alaska Native Claims Settlement Act (ANCSA).

Russian fur traders (and promyshlenniki [According to American historian and ethnologist Hubert Howe Bancroft, the Cossacks themselves were a light troop, but they were preceded by a still lighter flying advance guard called the promyshleniki, a kind of Russian coureurs des bois.] for North American fur trade and maritime fur trade), of the period Russian America (1733–1867), began settling Interior Alaska starting in the 1810s, establishing a trading post at Nulato on the Yukon River (of Koyukon homeland) and one (in the 1819 Copper Fort) at Taral (Russian Тарал, native Ahtna name Taghaelden) on the Copper River (of Ahtna homeland). British traders established Fort Yukon (of Gwich'in homeland) in 1847. Trade goods from these posts may have passed to Lower and Upper Tanana Athabaskans through intra-Native trade networks. Direct contact between Tanana Athabaskans and white traders increased after the 1860s. With the U.S. purchase of Alaska in 1867, control of trading stations and the fur trade passed to Americans. Through the 1880s, American traders established several additional posts on the Yukon and Tanana rivers, including locations at Nuklukayet (modern-day Tanana of Koyukon people homeland), Belle Isle (modern-day Eagle of Hän people homeland), and Fort Yukon. The Tanana River area has a documented Euroamerican history of less than 130 years, like the Tanana Athabaskan history.

The Nucha'la'woy'ya (or anglicized Nuchalawoya lit. 'where the two rivers meet') or Noochuloghoyet (lit «the point of the big river peninsula» and historically: Nukluroyit, Nuclavyette, Nukluklayet, Nukiukahyet, Nuklukait,, Nuklaciyat, Nuklukyat, Noukelakayet, Tuklukyet (modern-day Tanana) was a traditional trading settlement for Koyukon and Tanana Athabaskans long before European contact.

With the beginning of Euro-American contact in Interior Alaska in the early 19th century, trade influences and influxes of new populations began to change life in the region. Land use patterns shifted from traditional indigenous uses to activities based on Euro-American economic and political systems. As Euro-American traders (merchants), miners, missionaries, and explorers moved into the Tanana Valley, the traditional life ways of local Athabaskan groups were disrupted. Access to trade goods and the development of the fur trade not only affected traditional material culture but also began to dramatically affect subsistence activities and settlement patterns. Similarly, the arrival of missionaries in the Alaskan Interior profoundly influenced traditional social organization. The introduction of mission schools for Native children and the doctrine of new religious beliefs contributed to an erosion of traditional ecological knowledge and other traditional practices. After the Alaska Purchase in 1867, most of the Koyukon were converted by either Catholic or Protestant denominations. And by 1900, virtually all Alaskan Athabaskans were Christians, at least by name if not entirely by practice. An influenza epidemic in 1920 claimed one-fourth of the Lower Tanana Athabaskan population of Nenana (Toghotili).

== Hunting-gathering ==
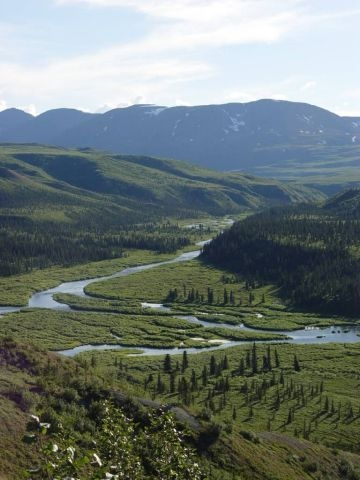
Delta River

The homeland of Tanana Athabaskans is the Dfc climate type subarctic boreal forest of the Nearctic realm called Interior Alaska-Yukon lowland taiga. Their lands are located in different two ecoregions:

1. The south of Tanana River, called Tanana-Kuskokwim Lowlands and this ecoregion forms an arch north of the Alaska Range and Lime Hills. Native people of the lowlands are mainly Koyukon, Tanana, and Kuskokwim Athabaskans. Fairbanks, North Pole, Tok, and Delta Junction are the main communities.
2. The north of Tanana River, called Yukon-Tanana Uplands and this ecoregion forms are rounded mountains and hills located between the Yukon and Tanana Rivers and spanning the Alaska-Yukon Territory border. Native people of the uplands are Tanacross, Tanana, and Hän Athabaskans. Main communities are Fox, Ester, and Eagle.

Tanana Athabaskans were semi-nomadic hunter-gatherers who moved seasonally throughout the year within a reasonably well-defined territory to harvest fish, bird, mammal, berry and other renewable resources. The Tanana territories generally is a mosaic of open and closed spruce forests covering the low gradient outwash slope between the Alaska Range and the flats and ridges north of the Tanana River.

The economy of Tanana Athabaskans is a mixed cash-subsistence system, like other modern foraging economies in Alaska. The subsistence economy is the main non-monetary economy system. Cash is often a rare commodity in foraging economies because of a lack of employment opportunities or perceived conflicts in the demands of wage employment and subsistence harvesting activities. The primary use of wild resources is domestic. Wild resource use in many Athabaskan villages is overwhelmingly for domestic consumption since commercial fishing in Alaska is absent. Commercial fishing and trapping patterns are controlled primarily by external factors. The state's limited entry system, operational by 1974 (after ANCSA), limits the number of available fishing permits for commercial salmon (esp. the Pacific salmon Oncorhynchus species for salmon cannery) fishing. In Nenana, about one-third of households have a permit. Most (70%) sample households with a permit used. Those with a permit who did not fish commercially did fish for subsistence.

Upper Nabesna–Chisana annual hunting-gathering cycle (< Guédon 1974)
| Resource | Oct | Nov | Dec | Jan | Feb | Mar | Apr | May | Jun | Jul | Aug | Sep |
|---|---|---|---|---|---|---|---|---|---|---|---|---|
| Porcupine caribou hunting | | | | | | | | | | | | |
| Alaska moose hunting | | | | | | | | | | | | |
| Dall sheep hunting | | | | | | | | | | | | |
| Snowshoe rabbit hunting | | | | | | | | | | | | |
| Beaver & Muskrat trapping | | | | | | | | | | | | |
| Ptarmigan & Grouse hunting | | | | | | | | | | | | |
| Whitefish catching | | | | | | | | | | | | |
| Berry gathering | | | | | | | | | | | | |
| Fur trapping | | | | | | | | | | | | |

Hunting was associated with seasonal movements along trails and frozen rivers, particularly as bands moved between rivers and uplands. The primary hunting animals for Tanana Athabaskans are big animals (caribou, moose, and wild sheep). The most valuable hunting animal is the caribou (subspecies Rangifer tarandus granti, Lower Tanana bedzeyh, Tanacross wudzih, Upper Tanana udzih). It was the most important food animal in the Upper Tanana before the coming of the non-natives and the resultant disintegration of the original nomadic patterns. Now, the economic life of the Upper Tanana centers around it. Not only does the animal constitute the source of food for the natives and their dogs, but it also supplies the material for their clothing, shelters, and boats, as well as netting for their snowshoes and babiche and sinew for their snares, cords, and lashings. The caribou hunt occurred in the early summer and mid-summer. Caribou hunting during the fall migration involved the use of fence, corral, and snare complexes and was a seasonal activity critical to the survival of the Tanana people. Today, most caribou meat is typically used fresh or frozen for later use. The moose (subspecies Alces alces gigas, Lower Tanana denigi, Tanacross dendîig, Upper Tanana diniign) is the other most important food animal for Tanana Athabaskans. The most common resource harvesting activity among Lower Tanana Athabaskan bands, Moose hunting is always a popular activity in modern Athabaskan communities because of the meat's economic value and a food preference for large game. Moose hunting in the fall was either an individual pursuit or a group activity. Moose meat was eaten fresh or preserved. The Mansfeld-Kechumstuk band of Tanacross employed several methods to hunt Dall sheep (in Alaskan English simply sheep, Lower Tanana deba, Tanacross demee, Upper Tanana dibee) in late summer and early fall in local mountainous areas or as far south as the Mentasta Mountains. Dall sheep were a desired source of food and material for clothing and tools.

Migratory waterfowl (ducks, geese, and swans) and upland game birds (ptarmigans and grouse) were a valued source of fresh meat. Grouse (spruce grouse, sharp-tailed grouse, ruffed grouse Lower Tanana deyh, Tanacross deyh, ch'ehtêeg, tsą́ą' ts'uug, Upper Tanana daih, ch'ahtagn, tsąą'ts'uu) and ptarmigan (willow ptarmigan and rock ptarmigan Lower Tanana k'orrh'eba, ddhełk'ola, Tanacross k'étmah, ddheł k'aal, Upper Tanana k'atbah) were taken opportunistically throughout the year with bow and arrows or with snares and fence-snare arrangements. Ducks and geese were easily captured when molting. Men in birchbark canoes quietly approached waterfowl in bays and coves and shot them with bows and arrows. Women and children then caught the birds and collected eggs from their nests.

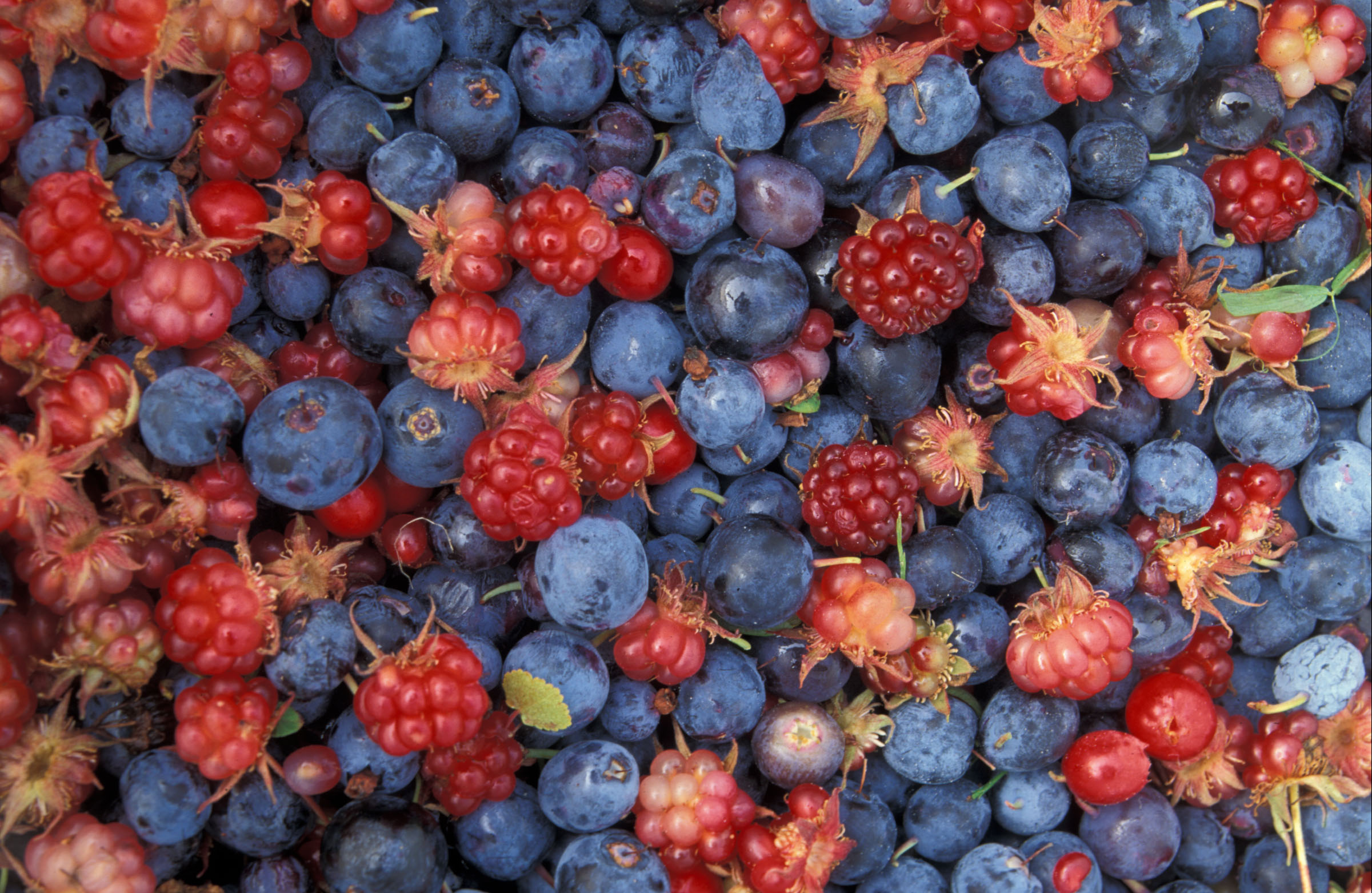
Alaska wild berries from the Innoko National Wildlife Refuge, a mixture of true berries (blue Vaccinium uliginosum and red Vaccinium vitis-idaea) and aggregate fruits (red Rubus arcticus)

Fishing (creek and river) was done near the village sites. The fish, which are domestic and most common, were stored in large subsurface caches. The main economical fish (Tanacross łuug, Upper Tanana łuugn, łuuk) species are mostly whitefish (humpback whitefish, round whitefish Tanacross xełtįį') and Pacific salmon (king (chinook) Upper Tanana gath, Tanacross łuug chox, red (sockeye) Upper Tanana łuugn delt'al, Tanacross łuug delt'el). Other fish species are pike (Upper Tanana ch'ulju̱u̱dn, Tanacross uljaaddh), grayling (Lower Tanana srajela, Upper Tanana seejiil, Tanacross seejel), lingcod (Upper Tanana and Tanacross ts'aan) and sucker (Upper Tanana taats'adn, Tanacross tats'aht'ôl). Fishing at Mansfield Lake and Fish Creek for whitefish, pike, and grayling began in the late spring and continued until mid-July. It was a major harvest activity and whitefish, a perennially reliable food source, was especially important. All band members except the very young children assisted in harvesting and processing the catch. The spring fish harvest provided a welcome dietary change after a long winter of eating mostly dried fish and meat. Fish not eaten fresh were processed and dried on drying racks for later consumption. Both fresh and dried fish were cooked in water boiled by placing heated stones into a birch bark basket.

The white spruce (Picea glauca) and black spruce (Picea mariana) are the dominant trees, with their maximum tree line being held at around 4,000 feet. Only stunted willows and alders are found above this level. Several ferns, such as the ostrich, wood, beech and oak fern, grow in the lowlands. Beginning in late spring and continuing throughout the summer and early fall months, both adults and children gathered a variety of plants and vegetative materials. Fruit and berries (Lower Tanana jega, deneyh, nekotl, Tanacross jêg, ntl'ét, nit-sįį', Upper Tanana jjign, nt'lat, niitsil), edible roots (esp. Indian potato or wild carrot Hedysarum alpinum Lower Tanana troth), and assorted plants (esp. wild rhubarb Polygonum alaskanum) were eaten fresh, preserved for later consumption, or used for medicinal purposes. Birch bark of paper birch (Lower Tanana k'iyh, Tanacross and Upper Tanana k'įį) and spruce roots (Tanacross xeyh) were needed to make baskets, cooking vessels, tools, cradleboards, and canoes. The Upper Tanana use lingonberries (Vaccinium vitis-idaea) as a food source. They boil the berries with sugar and flour to thicken; eat the raw berries, either plain or mixing them with sugar, grease, or the combination of the two; fry them in grease with sugar or dried fish eggs; or make them into pies, jam, and jelly. They also preserve the berries alone or in grease and store them in a birchbark basket in an underground cache or freeze them. They also use them in their traditional medicine, eating the berries or using the juice of the berries for colds, coughs, and sore throats.

== Kinship ==
The Tanana kinship is based on what is formally known as an Iroquois kinship and reflects the matrilineal clan system and the importance of cross-cousin marriage. Individuals in the Tanana society are born into their mother's clan. Their society was and still is composed of eight or nine matrilineal clans that are arranged in exogamous moieties named Raven (or Crow) and Sea Gull (or Wolf). Marriage was supposed to occur between a man and a woman from opposite clans.

== Culture ==
=== Religion ===
==== Animism and shamanism ====
Historically and traditionally, Tanana and all other Alaskan Athabaskans practice animism and shamanism. The animistic belief system common to all Alaskan Athabaskan groups might be briefly characterized as follows: All creatures and some inanimate objects had spirits, which were active and powerful components of those creatures. The spirits enabled an animal to know more than was immediately apparent to him. Thus, if human beings did something that displeased the animal's spirit, the animal itself would remain aloof from the people, and the people might starve. There were very definite rules that people had to follow when dealing with animals based on this belief in animal spirits.

Aboriginally and in early historic times, the shaman, called a medicine man or medicine woman (Tanacross deshen Upper Tanana dishin) was the central figure of Athabaskan religious life. The shaman within this culture was the middle man/woman between spirits and the native peoples. Magico-religious practices included omens, charms, amulets, songs, taboos, and beliefs about the supernatural. Beliefs and practices were associated with certain animals, and many centered on hunting. Animal spirits appear to have predominated Tanana spiritual life. They believed that an evil spirit was manifested in a half-man, half-animal being. Spirits were influential in the activities of the living and in guiding the dead to their final resting place. Athabaskan shamans guarded people against the effects of bad spirits. The shaman also diagnosed various illnesses and restored the health of those harmed by bad spirits. The shaman could also provide the valuable service of scapulimancy, which predicted the location of game when hunting was scarce. According to cultural anthropologist Richard K. Nelson (who lived for extended periods in Alaskan Athabaskan villages), Athabaskan traditions teach that everything in nature is fundamentally spiritual and must be treated with respect. This includes not only avoiding waste but also following an elaborate code of morality toward plants, animals, and the earth itself. For example, if an Upper Tanana man kills a wolf, he should never touch it until he formally apologizes and explains that his family needs it.

The taboos (Tanacross injih, Upper Tanana įhjih) are animistic and forbidden. In addition to adhering to a code of behavior, people observed a variety of taboos designed to prevent misfortune or bad luck. Many of these taboos were associated with hunting or some other aspect of the food-gathering process, thus underscoring the importance of these activities for the survival of the group. Ravens, cranes, wolverines, foxes, otters, and dogs must never be eaten. The heads of caribou, moose, and Dall sheep may not be fed to the dogs; to do so would bring the hunter poor luck. Neither the bones nor the carcasses of fur-bearing animals may be fed to dogs and must be cached in a safe place. Should the dogs get them, the hunter will take no more fur. Women of childbearing age did not eat bears (Grizzly or Alaskan brown bear and black bear). Young boys could not eat fat around an animal's eye until adulthood. No animals except dogs could be brought up as pets.

==== Christianity ====
The Interior Athabaskans, for the most part, were contacted and missionized by Roman Catholic (for Koyukon Athabaskans), Russian Orthodox (for Dena'ina, Ahtna, Deg Hit'an, Holikachuk, Upper Kuskokwim Athabaskans), and Anglican missionaries (for Gwich'in, Hän, Tanana Athabaskans). Christian missionaries of the Episcopal Church established churches and missions in the area of Tanana Athabaskan beginning in the early 1900s. In 1905, the Episcopal Church, which had missionaries in Alaska, built the St. Mark's Episcopal mission and Tortella (Toghotili, nowadays Nenana) School a short distance upriver. The boarding school taught about 28 children of various ages at a time. Hudson Stuck, the Archdeacon of the Yukon, regularly visited the settlement, part of the 250,000 square-acre territory of the Interior he administered. Native Athabaskan children from other communities, such as Minto, also attended school in Nenana.

=== Potlatches ===
The Athabaskan potlatch (Tanacross xtíitl, Upper Tanana -hotįįł) or the gathering-up ceremony is a mid-winter ceremonial activity of traditional potlatch among Athabaskan peoples. This was one event at which people from different local and even regional bands met. The several regional bands attending a potlatch might have spoken slightly different dialects, which were nonetheless close enough to each other to be mutually intelligible. The importance of potlatches in establishing friendly ties with outside groups has already been discussed: marriages and trade partnerships often grew out of association at a potlatch. The potlatch usually lasted for a week. The most elaborate of Athabaskan potlatches was the funeral potlatch (or memorial potlatch, mortuary potlatch). The funeral potlatch marks the separation of the deceased from the world and is the last public expression of grief. Memorial potlatches are held by family members of a deceased person one year after the death. It is a mourning opportunity as well as one to honor the deceased. Other potlatches were held to demonstrate the wealth, prosperity, or luck of a person: the more potlatches, the greater the wealth. Fresh moose meat is essential to the Athabaskan funeral potlatch. Today, the most well-known potlatch is Nuchalawoyya Potlatch of the Native Village of Tanana. Archaeological evidence of potlatching is found at the 1000-year-old Pickupsticks site near Shaw Creek in the Middle Tanana Valley.

=== Literature ===
The Upper Tanana area has a rich storytelling tradition. Old-time stories are known in many Northern Athabaskan languages under several different labels. They are set in mythical times when animals and humans could still communicate. Traditionally, stories were told in the evenings in winter in a group setting and were told to educate the young.

=== Art ===
The arts of the Tanana Athabaskans are classified as Alaska Native art. Birch bark baskets are the most common type of basketry made by Athabaskan women. Today, birch bark is used primarily for baskets made for sale and for bark baby carriers.

=== Cuisine ===
The Alaskan Athabaskan Indian ice cream (Lower Tanana nonathdlodi, Tanacross nanehdlaad) is dessert-like dry meat mixed with moose fat and is different from the Canadian Indian ice cream of First Nations in British Columbia. One recipe for Indian ice cream consisted of dried and pulverized tenderloin that was blended with moose grease in a birch bark container until the mixture was light and fluffy. In addition, Alaskan Athabaskan communities also create songs for performances at potlatches, such as dance songs, potlatch songs, and mourning songs. Within stories and embedded in fragments of folklore, old shamanic songs are also partially remembered; they are called "ice‐cream songs" because they used to be sung during the preparation of nonathdlodi, or "Indian ice cream."

== Transportation ==
Historically and traditionally, Alaskan Athabaskans use pedestrian transportation; they travel on foot (in winter using birchbark snowshoes). Caribou were also pursued individually on snowshoes during winter by hunters using bows and arrows. Athabascan women regularly carry their children with the help of a baby belt. Dogs (Lower Tanana łiga, Tanacross łii) are used in many Athabaskan villages mostly for hunting and as pack animals. Dog sleds (Lower Tanana xwtl, Tanacross xědl) are an ancient and widespread means of transportation for Eskimo peoples (western central Alaskan Yup'ik people and northern and northwestern Alaskan Inupiat people). When non-Native fur traders and explorers first traveled the Yukon River and other interior regions in the mid-19th century, they also observed that a few Athabascan groups, including the Koyukon, Deg Hit'an, and Holikachuk, used dog sleds. The Athabascans had probably learned the technique from their Iñupiat or Yup'ik Eskimo neighbors. The Gwich'in, Tanana, Ahtna, and others pulled their sleds and toboggans by hand, using dogs solely for hunting and as pack animals. Dogs sometimes were used to drive the moose into the fence and snares.

== Modern tribal unions ==
Historically, the Tanana Athabaskan people did not consider themselves as living in "tribes." It is a relatively recent term connected with political recognition by the U.S. government.

=== Tribal entities ===
Alaska Native tribal entities for Tanana Athabaskans are recognized by the United States Bureau of Indian Affairs:

| Tribal entities | Location (native name) | Ethnolinguistic group |
|---|---|---|
| Native Village of Minto | Minto (Menh Ti) | Lower Tanana |
| Nenana Native Association | Nenana (Toghotthele) | Lower Tanana |
| Village of Dot Lake | Dot Lake (Kelt'aaddh Menn' - 'Waterlily Lake') | Tanacross |
| Healy Lake Village | Healy Lake (Mendees Cheeg - 'shallows mouth lake') | Tanacross |
| Native Village of Tanacross | Tanacross (Taats'altęy) | Tanacross |
| Northway Village | Northway (K'ehtthiign) | Upper Tanana |
| Native Village of Tetlin | Tetlin (Teełąy) | Upper Tanana |

=== ANCSA ===
The Alaska Native Regional Corporations of Tanana Athabaskans were established in 1971 when the United States Congress passed the Alaska Native Claims Settlement Act (ANCSA).

| Native Village Corporation | Community | Alaska Native Reg. Corp. | Ethnolinguistic group |
|---|---|---|---|
| Seth-do-ya-ah Corporation | Minto | Doyon, Limited | Lower Tanana |
| Toghotthele Corporation | Nenana | Doyon, Limited | Lower Tanana |
| Dot Lake Native Corporation | Dot Lake | Doyon, Limited | Tanacross |
| Mendas Cha-ag Native Corporation | Healy Lake | Doyon, Limited | Tanacross |
| Tanacross Inc. | Tanacross | Doyon, Limited | Tanacross |
| Northway Natives Inc. | Northway | Doyon, Limited | Upper Tanana |
| Tetlin Indian Reservation | Tetlin | Doyon, Limited | Upper Tanana |

=== Tanana Chiefs Conference ===
The Tanana Chiefs Conference is a traditional tribal consortium of all Central Alaskan Athabaskans (or Interior Athabaskans), with the exception of the Southern Alaskan Athabaskans (or Southern Athabaskans: Dena'ina and Ahtna). On the broad cultural profile factors of regional environment, land use and occupancy, and social organization, Southern Athabaskans (Dena'ina and Ahtna) life more closely resembled the other southern Native societies. In the North, the life of the Interior Athabaskans more closely resembled other northern Native societies.

- Yukon-Tanana Subregion
  - Minto Traditional Council, Minto, members are Minto band of Lower Tanana
  - Nenana Traditional Council, Nenana, members are Nenana-Toklat band of Lower Tanana
- Upper Tanana Subregion
  - Dot Lake Village Council, Dot Lake, members are Mansfeld-Kechumstuk band of Tanacross
  - Healy Lake Traditional Council, Healy Lake, members are Healy River-Joseph band of Tanacross
  - Tanacross IRA Council, Tanacross, members are Mansfeld-Kechumstuk band of Tanacross
  - Tok Native Association, Tok, members are Mansfeld-Kechumstuk band of Tanacross
  - Northway Traditional Council, Northway, members are Lower Nabesna band of Upper Tanana
  - Tetlin IRA Council, Tetlin, members are Tetlin-Last Tetlin band of Upper Tanana

== Sources of language materials in Tanana languages ==
Lower Tanana language:

- Kari, James 1991. Lower Tanana Athabaskan listening and writing exercises. Fairbanks: Alaska Native Language Center

Tanacross language:

- Arnold, I. S., G. Holton, and R. Thoman 2009.Tanacross Learnersʼ Dictionary.

Upper Tanana language:

- Milanowski, Paul G. & John, Alfred. 1979. Nee'aaneegn'/Upper Tanana (Tetlin) Junior Dictionary. Anchorage: National Bilingual Materials Development Center.
