= Tanana Chiefs Conference =

Gathering of Indigenous leaders in Alaska

The Tanana Chiefs Conference (TCC), the traditional tribal consortium of the 42 villages of Interior Alaska, is a non-profit organization that works toward meeting the needs and challenges for more than 10,000 Alaska Natives (mostly Alaskan Athabaskans) in Interior Alaska. The consortium is based on a belief in tribal self-determination and the need for regional Native unity.

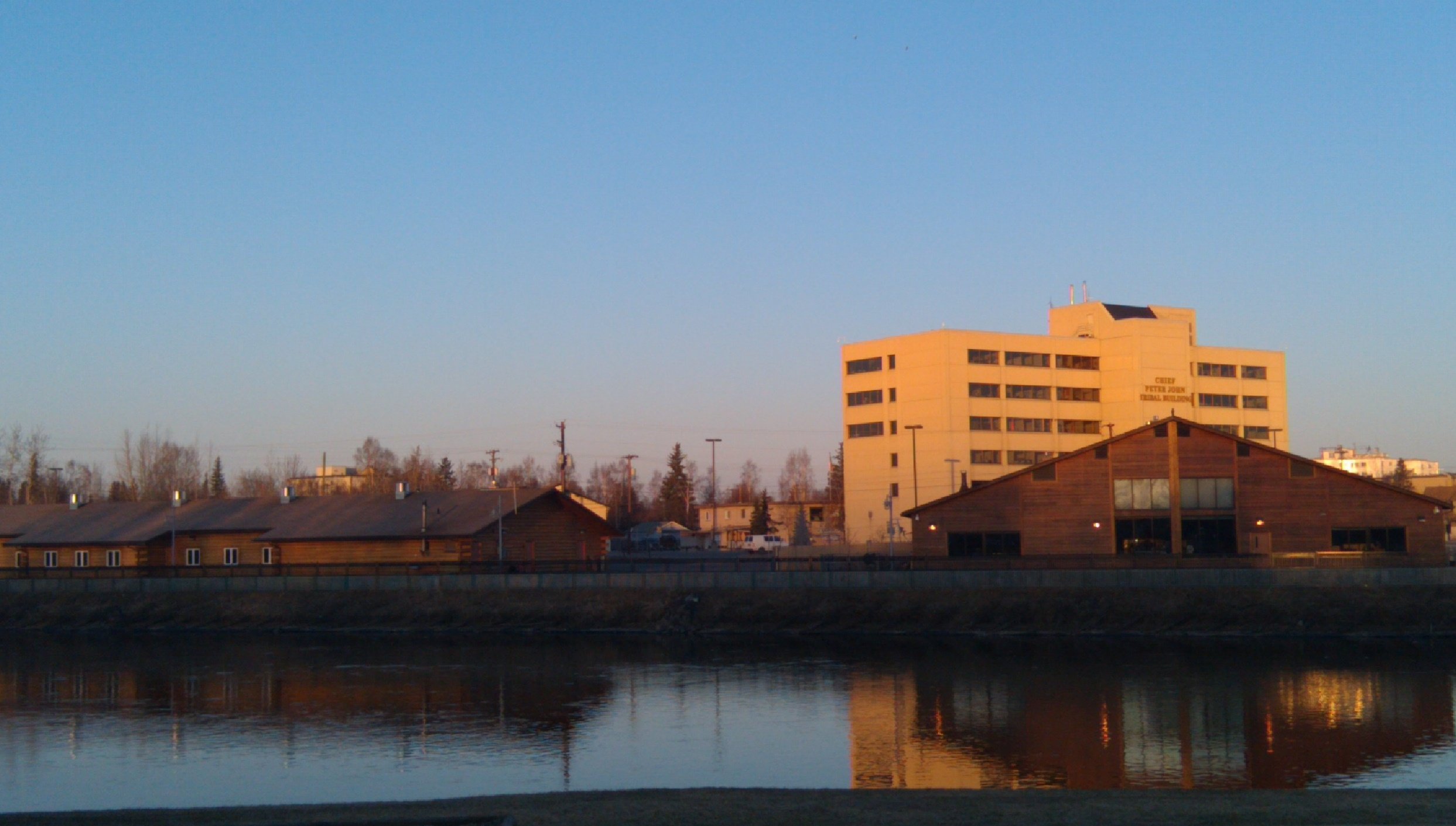
TCC main campus in downtown Fairbanks, with the Chena River in the foreground.

== Organizational structure ==
The Tanana Chiefs Conference is a non-profit organization with a membership of Native governments from 42 Interior Alaska communities. The Board of Directors is composed of 42 representatives selected by the village councils of member communities. The board meets each March in Fairbanks.

The nine-member Executive Board is elected by the Board of Directors. The president of the Board of Directors is elected by the full board and serves as the chief executive officer of the corporation. Programs funded by the Bureau of Indian Affairs, the Department of Labor and the Alaska Native Health Services are available to tribal governments, and eligible Alaska Native and American Indians. Services financed by the state of Alaska are provided for all residents of the region.

In 2006, The Tanana Chiefs Conference had almost seven hundred full-time employees and numerous part-time and seasonal positions. About two-thirds of the staff members work in village positions, with two-thirds of the staff members also being Alaskan Natives.

== History ==
The history of the Tanana Chiefs Conference (TCC) reflects the importance of balancing the traditional Native values with the modern demands facing us as indigenous peoples. TCC works toward meeting the health and social service challenges for more than 10,000 Alaska Natives spread across a region of 235,000 square miles (610,000 km^{2}) in Interior Alaska.

TCC's movement into the modern era began with the advancement of non-Natives into the Interior. Tribal leaders strengthened their loose confederation to protect traditional rights.

The first land dispute came in 1915 when the chiefs organized to protect a burial ground in Nenana from the Alaska Railroad. As a result, the railroad avoided the cemetery. Conflicts became an increasing problem; the threat of loss of Native land grew after statehood in 1959.

The Alaska Statehood Act recognized Native land rights, yet the state administration began planning as though it did not. It had two plans that were of particular concern. One was to build a road to the Minto Lakes area northwest of Fairbanks and the Rampart Dam project. That project and another ill-conceived idea - creating a harbor at Point Hope on the Northwest coast with nuclear blast - contributed substantially to the rise of the land claims movement. A remarkable array of young, educated Native leaders began pushing the land claims toward a suitable outcome.

One of the first was Al Ketzler Sr., of Nenana. He helped organize a meeting of 32 villages at Tanana in June 1962, leading to the incorporation of The Tanana Chiefs Conference.

Acting as the conference's first president, Ketzler contacted national Indian organizations and met with the Alaska Native Brotherhood, an organization formed in Sitka by Tlingits and Haidas of southeastern Alaska in the early part of the 20th century. He also met with the Barrow-based Inupiat Paitot, the forerunner of the Arctic Slope Native Association, and with the Association of Village Council Presidents in the Lower Kuskokwim area. In 1963, Ketzler flew to Washington, D.C., to present a petition from 24 villages asking Secretary of the Interior Stewart Udall to freeze state land selections until the Native land claims were settled. Ketzler left TCC from 1964 until 1969 to go back to Nenana, but other young leaders - Ralph Purdue, John Sackett and Tim Wallis - took over. In October 1966, TCC met in Anchorage with other Native leaders from around the state, including the active and vocal delegations from ANB and ASNA, and formed the Alaska Federation of Natives.

In 1968, Alaska Natives were ready when oil was discovered on the North Slope. The first land settlement bill had been introduced in the United States Congress, and claims had been registered for most of the land in question. Secretary Udall, acting on Ketzler's petition, had frozen the status of land titles in the absence of a Native land claims settlement in late 1966. The land freeze sharpened the interest of the state and the oil companies to settle the land disputes. After a historic struggle in which Ketzler and dozens of other Alaska Natives lived in Washington, D.C., for weeks, Congress authorized a settlement of more than 40 million acres (160,000 km^{2}) and nearly $1 billion to Alaska Natives through a corporate structure.

The Alaska Native Claims Settlement Act (ANCSA) of December 1971 set up 13 regional for-profit corporations for Alaska Natives - 12 in the state and one based in the Lower 48 for Alaska Natives living in the continental United States and nearly 200 village corporations. The act created the regional corporations for the management of land and financial assets, and overseeing the development of natural resources. Village corporations, representing individual Native communities, have their own natural and financial resources to maintain.

TCC incorporated Doyon Limited as the regional for-profit corporation for the specific purpose of making a profit for their stockholders. The act left a place for non-profit corporations to administer health and social service programs for the people. The Tanana Chiefs Conference became the non-profit corporation for the TCC region.

With the land claims settlement, a major goal had been accomplished. But other pressing needs remained. Under the leadership of Mitch Demientieff, a 20-year-old University of Alaska student when elected TCC president in 1973, TCC developed a regional health authority for tribal health programs. The organization acted quickly when the Indian Self Determination and Education Act of 1975 allowed it to become the responsible provider for dozens of programs in the region. Contracts with the Bureau of Indian Affairs were established to transfer the responsibility for management and delivery of services such as housing, lands management, tribal government assistance, education and employment and natural resources programs to TCC.

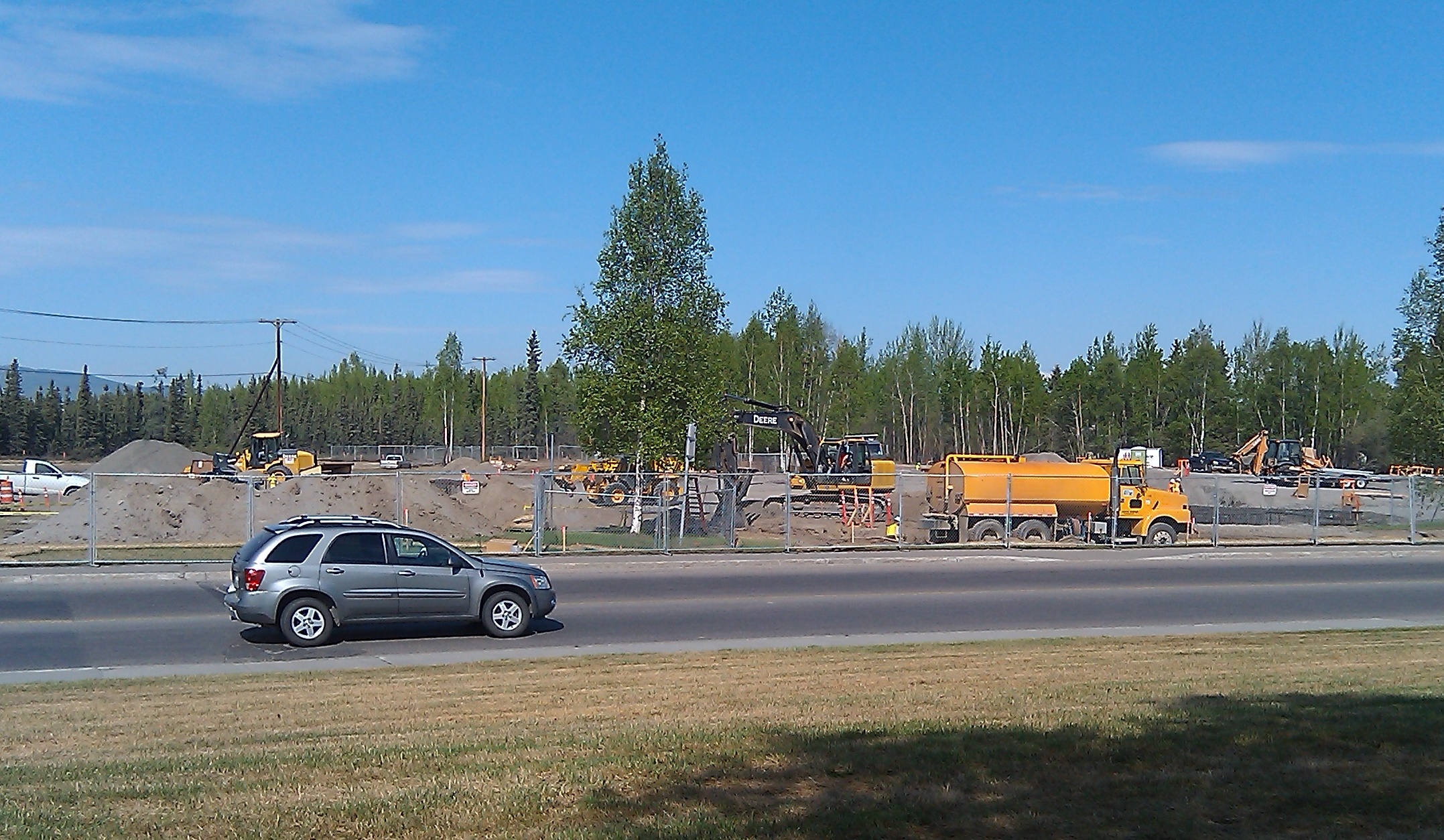
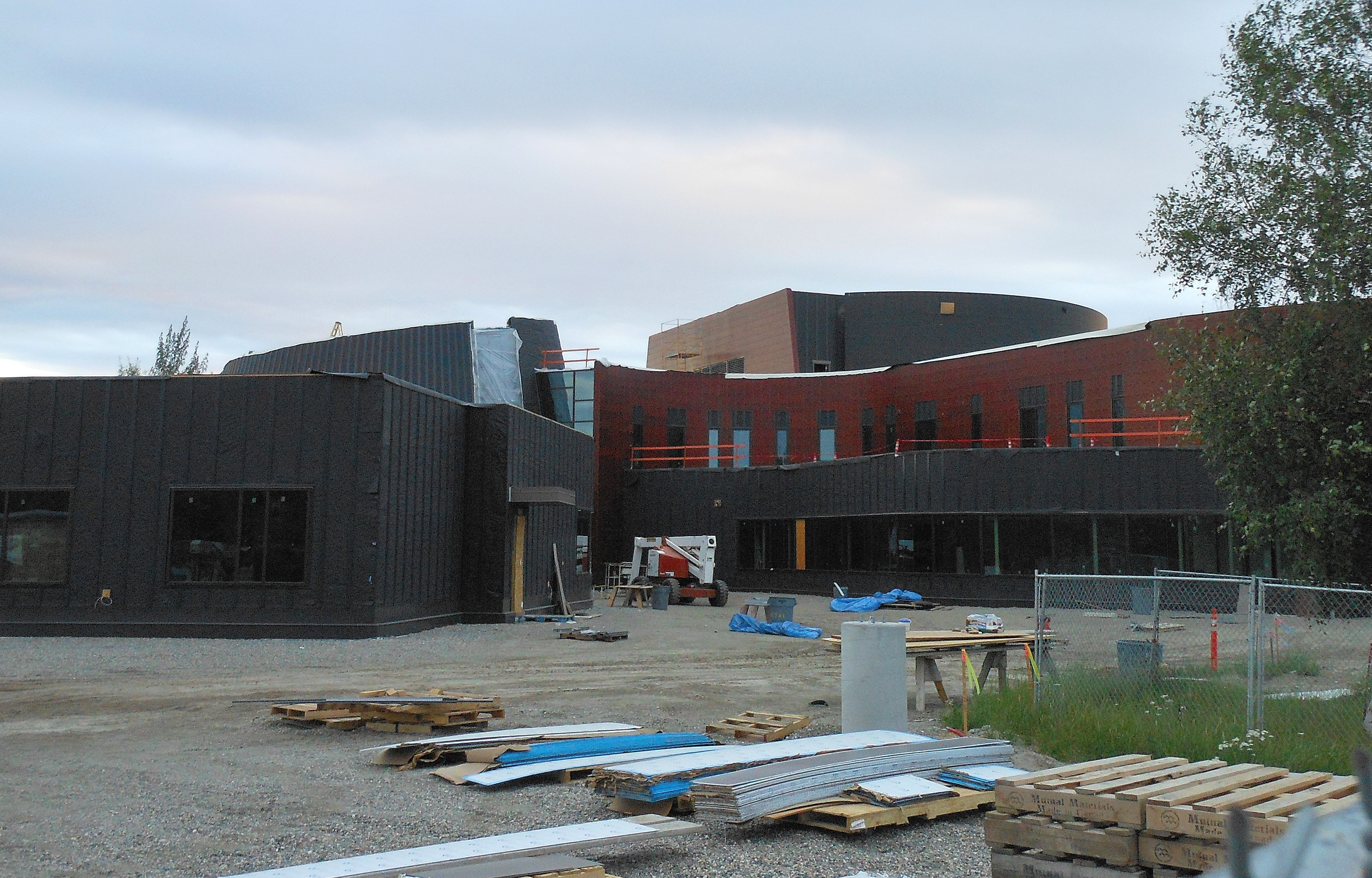
The Chief Andrew Isaac Health Center, across from Fairbanks Memorial Hospital, is TCC's primary health care facility. Left: Beginning stages of construction, May 2011. Right: Nearing completion, June 2012.

Contracts with the Alaska Area Native Health Service were established for Community Health Aide services, outreach services, environmental health, mental health and substance abuse services, and other programs in a gradual sequence. In the late 1970s, TCC successfully bid to receive a number of grants from the state of Alaska for delivery of health care, social services and public safety services to all residents of the interior.

In 1980, TCC moved to decentralize the operations of its programs away from Fairbanks, through the establishment of subregional offices in Fairbanks, Fort Yukon, Galena, Holy Cross, McGrath and Tok. During the 1980s, this process allowed for more local employment, attention to subregional program priorities, and better access by TCC clients to information and services.

In the mid-1980s, under the leadership of President William C. "Spud" Williams, TCC successfully assumed management of the Alaska Native Health Center in Fairbanks (renamed the Chief Andrew Isaac Health Center after the late Traditional Athabascan Chiefs from Dot Lake) and the contract health care program. In the late 1980s, other new facilities and services were developed, including the Paul Williams House, the CAIHC Counseling Center, the new TCC Dental Clinic and Eye Clinic, and several remote-site alcohol recovery camps.

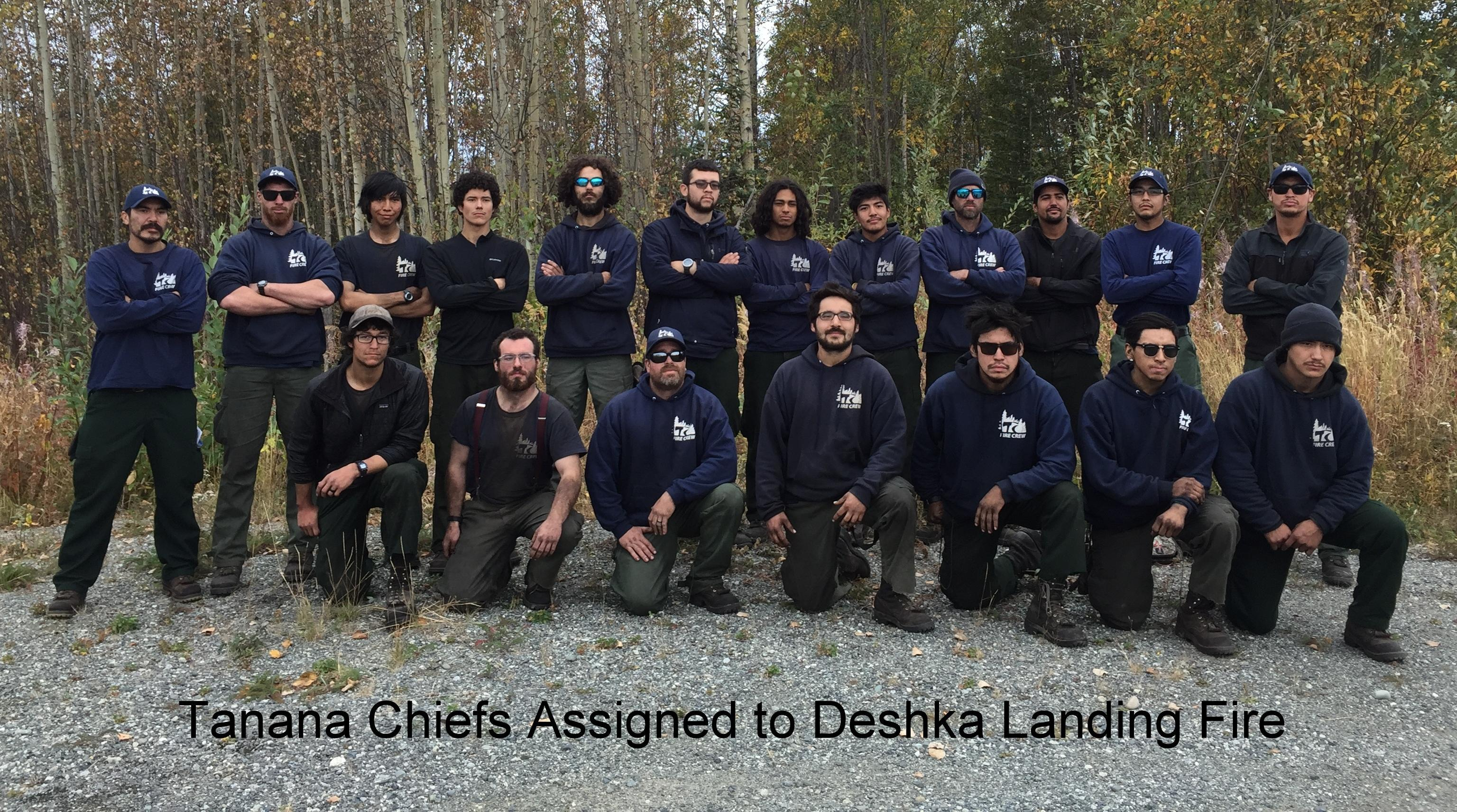
Tanana Chiefs Fire Crew in 2019

Underlying all these programs are the commitments started by the Tanana Chiefs generations ago where the two rivers meet. The commitment translates into political advocacy for land rights and self-determination. It means working for a strong priority under law for the subsistence rights of rural Alaskans. And it includes support for local village governments that choose to enforce their own laws under their own authority.

== Demographics ==
The Tanana Chiefs Conference region covers an area of 235,000 square miles (610,000 km^{2}), an area equal to about 37 percent of the state of Alaska, and just slightly smaller than the state of Texas. The total population of the region is 86,130, of which 10,623 are Natives. About one-half of the entire Native population resides in Fairbanks, which is the only urban area in the region.

== Cities and villages ==
(Ordered roughly from east to west)

=== Upper Tanana Subregion ===
- Dot Lake
- Eagle
- Fairbanks
- Healy Lake
- Northway
- Tanacross
- Tetlin
- Tok

=== Yukon Flats Subregion ===
- Arctic Village
- Beaver
- Canyon Village
- Chalkyitsik
- Circle
- Fort Yukon
- Venetie

=== Yukon-Tanana Subregion ===
- Alatna
- Allakaket
- Evansville (Bettles Field)
- Hughes
- Kaktovik
- Manley Hot Springs
- Minto
- Nenana
- Rampart
- Stevens Village
- Tanana

=== Upper Kuskokwim Subregion ===
- McGrath
- Nikolai
- Takotna
- Telida

=== Yukon-Koyukuk Subregion ===
- Galena
- Huslia
- Kaltag
- Koyukuk
- Nulato
- Ruby

=== Lower Yukon Subregion ===
- Anvik
- Grayling
- Holy Cross
- Shageluk
