= Tanacross language =

Endangered Athabaskan language of Alaska

Tanacross
- Neeʼaanděgʼ
- Native to: United States
- Region: Alaska (middle Tanana River)
- Ethnicity: 220 Tanana (2007)
- Native speakers: <10 (2020)
- Language family: Na-Dené: Athabaskan–Eyak; Athabaskan; Northern Athabaskan; Tanacross
- Writing system: Latin script

Official status
- Official language in: Alaska

Language codes
- ISO 639-3: tcb
- Glottolog: tana1290
- ELP: Tanacross
- Tanacross is classified as Critically Endangered by the UNESCO Atlas of the World's Languages in Danger.

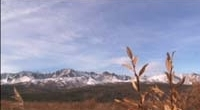
Tanacross Mountain

Tanacross (also Transitional Tanana) is an endangered Athabaskan language spoken by fewer than 60 people in eastern Interior Alaska.

== Overview ==
The word Tanacross (from "Tanana Crossing") has been used to refer both to a village in eastern Alaska and to an ethnolinguistic group. The modern village of Tanacross is accessible by a short access road from the Alaska Highway, and some speakers now reside in the regional center of Tok, located approximately ten miles east of the village on the highway. In addition several speakers now reside in the nearest commercial center of Fairbanks, located two hundred miles downstream from Tanacross village and accessible by all-weather highway.

Location of Tanacross language area

Tanacross is the ancestral language of the Mansfield-Kechumstuk and Healy Lake-Joseph Village bands of Tanana Athabaskan people, whose ancestral territory encompassed an area bounded by the Goodpaster River to the west, the Alaska Range to the south, the Fortymile and Tok rivers to the east, and the Yukon Uplands to the north.

In the late nineteenth century trading posts were established at Tanana Crossing, a ford along the Eagle Trail, directly across the Tanana River from the present-day village of Tanacross. A telegraph station followed in 1902, and an Episcopal mission in 1909. Both the Mansfield-Kechumstuk and Healy Lake-Joseph Village bands eventually settled in Tanana Crossing, eventually shortened to Tanacross (McKennan 1959). The village was relocated across the river to its present location in the early 1970s, and most present-day Tanacross speakers live in or near the village of Tanacross.

== Etymology ==
The name Tanacross has only recently been applied to the language and still has limited currency outside academic circles. Many other glottonyms have been used. Wrangell's 1839 wordlist refers to the language as the "Copper River Kolchan", though Wrangell certainly had no notion of the linguistic geography of the Tanacross region. The first extensive ethnographic research in the area was conducted by McKennan in 1929-30, who excludes Tanacross from his map of what he labels as the Upper Tanana region (1959: 16). However, McKennan later appears to lump Tanacross and Upper Tanana together under the label Upper Tanana, noting:

"In considering the Tanana River as a whole, however, the [Tanana] Crossing and Upper Tanana natives should be lumped together, for between the Crossing and Healy River occur a whole series of rapids which today make navigation exceedingly dangerous and in earlier days practically prevented it." (23)

McKennan mistakenly assumes that the Tanana River was a major transportation corridor, when in fact the various Tanacross bands have never had a true riverine culture, having only settled on the Tanana River in the twentieth century. The rapids referred to by McKennan serve as a barrier to salmon migration and remove a major incentive for river settlement (de Laguna & McClellan 1960). In contrast, land travel in this region is relatively easy, and extensive networks of trails connect the villages of the Tanacross region. Many of these trails are still used for hunting access. And at least until the construction of the Alaska Highway in 1942, foot and sled travel between Healy Lake, Mansfield and Kechumstuk was extremely common (Ellen Demit, p.c.).

Osgood (1936) uses the term Tanana for the entire region of the Tanana River drainage below the Tok River to the confluence of the Tanana and Yukon rivers. Shinen (1958), who recorded a word list from Mary Charlie and Oscar Isaac in Tanacross village, refers to the language as the "Nabesna dialect", and Shinen's term was repeated in Hoijer (1963). Nabesna was actually Osgood's preferred term for Upper Tanana, so Shinen appears to have followed McKennan in lumping Tanacross and Upper Tanana together but adopted Osgood's glottonym. Shinen's list is clearly of Tanacross, not Upper Tanana origin. De Laguna & McClellan (1960) use the term Tanacross language, but only in a restricted sense referring to the language of Tanacross village proper. Krauss originally included Tanacross with Lower Tanana, but after a more extensive linguistic survey of the region in the 1960s, he began using the term "Transitional Tanana", recognizing the distinction between Tanacross and the remainder of Tanana (Krauss, p.c.). As the significance of this distinction grew to justify a language rather than dialect boundary, the name Tanacross was applied to the Tanacross linguistic region, appearing for example in Krauss' 1973 survey of the Athabaskan languages. The preferred self-designation for the language is simply "Indian", though "Native Language" is sometimes used in more formal contexts. The term "Athabaskan" is disliked. The indigenous word neò/aòneg, usually translated as 'our language', is also sometimes heard, though this is likely a neologism.

Tanacross is part of a large language/dialect complex, and the Tanacross linguistic region is bordered by several other closely related Athabaskan languages. To the northwest is Han, spoken in Eagle and across the Canada–US border in Dawson and Moosehide. To the east is the language known by the geographic term Upper Tanana, spoken in the villages of Tetlin, Northway, Scottie Creek, Beaver Creek, and (formerly) Chisana. Tanacross and Upper Tanana share a high degree of mutual intelligibility, though the tonal patterns (with the exception of the Tetlin dialect, which is apparently toneless) are reversed. To the south near the headwaters of the Copper River in Mentasta is the Ahtna language. The Mentasta dialect of Ahtna is the most divergent of the four main Ahtna dialects and shares many lexical and phonological features with Tanacross rather than with the other Ahtna dialects. McKennan remarks:

"The Tanana Crossing people have always been in much closer contact with the Indians of Copper River, the valley of the Tok [River] leading to the easy Mentasta Pass and thence down Slana River to the Copper. The Upper Tanana natives maintain that the Crossing dialect is much more similar to that of the Copper River than is their own." (23)

== Dialectology ==
Until very recently Lower Tanana was spoken at Salcha (Saagescheeg), just west of the Tanacross language area near the mouth of the Salcha River. As might be expected, Salcha shares many features with Healy Lake, the westernmost dialect of Tanacross, though the two are readily distinguished as separate languages (in particular by the presence of high marked tone in Healy Lake). With the passing of the Salcha dialect, the nearest Lower Tanana villages are located more than one hundred miles downstream at Nenana and Minto, and the linguistic boundary between Tanacross and Lower Tanana is now even more distinct.

The Tanacross linguistic region is geographically small by Alaska Athabaskan standards and hence contains little dialectal variation. A small number of phonological features distinguish two major dialects. The Mansfield (Dihthâad)-Kechumstuk (Saages Cheeg) (MK) dialect of Tanacross (Dihthaad Xt'een Aandeg' - ″The Mansfield People's Language″, referring to the traditional village of Mansfield (Dihthâad), north of Tanacross) was formerly spoken at Mansfield Lake (dihTa$òd/) and Kechumstuk, until those bands combined and later moved to Tanacross village. This is the dialect spoken in Tanacross village and the dialect upon which this study is based. Unless indicated otherwise reference to Tanacross language should be assumed to mean the MK dialect. A second dialect of Tanacross is spoken by the Healy Lake-Joseph Village bands at Healy Lake (Mendees Cheeg) and Dot Lake (Kelt’aaddh Menn’) to the west, and formerly at Joseph Village, and is linguistically distinguished by the retention of schwa suffixes.

== Status ==
As with all of the Athabaskan languages of Alaska, Tanacross is extremely endangered. Although most children have passive understanding of simple commands and phrases, most fluent speakers of Tanacross are at least fifty years old. Only among the oldest speakers is Tanacross the language of daily communication. Based on the age of the youngest speakers, Krauss (1997) estimates 65 speakers out of a total population of 220. In spite of the relatively small number of speakers, the percentage of speakers out of the total population is quite high for an Alaska Athabaskan language. Outside Tanacross village proper the percentage is much lower. Although 1990 census figures place the combined populations of Dot Lake and Healy Lake at 117, Kari (p.c.) estimates fewer than four speakers at Healy Lake and perhaps two or three at Dot Lake.

In spite of its small size (population 140) and proximity to predominantly non-native community of Tok, Tanacross village maintains its own school, where Tanacross literacy is sometimes taught. In addition, most households in the village contain at least one fluent Tanacross speaker. Recently there has been an increase in interest in language revitalization, particularly among middle aged adults. A Tanacross Language Workshop was conducted in 1990, and several training sessions were held at the Yukon Native Language Centre in Whitehorse throughout the 1990s. These training sessions resulted in Native Language teaching certification for at least one speaker. Tanacross language classes are planned at the University of Alaska regional center in Tok.

== Phonology ==
Tanacross has a typically Athabaskan large phoneme inventory, which is characterised by a large number of consonants produced in dental and alveolar place of articulation. As other Athabaskan languages, Tanacross contrasts stops in three phonation types: voiceless, voiceless aspirated, and ejective.

It is one of four Athabaskan tonal languages spoken in Alaska, besides Gwichʼin, Han, and Upper Tanana.

=== Vowels ===
There are six phonemic vowel qualities /i e ɛ u o ɑ/. Of these, /i e u ɑ/ also occur as both phonologically long vowels and as nasalised vowels, yielding a total of 18 vowel phonemes, excluding tone possibilities.

	Front		Back	
	Oral	Nasalised	Oral	Nasalized
High	i iː	ĩ ĩː	u uː	ũ ũː
Mid	e eː	ẽ ẽː	o	
Low	ɛ		ɑ ɑː	ɑ̃ ɑ̃ː

Near minimal pairs regarding vowel quality:

- /ʃɑ̀ːs/ shaas “drum”
- /ʃòs/ shos “black bear”
- /súːs/ súus “robin”

==== Vowel allophones ====
- /i/ is lowered to [ɪ] in CVC syllables, excluding CVʔ: /síntʼeh/ occurs as in [sɪ́n.tʼèh]; sínt'eh ‘he is’
- /ɛ/ undergoes backing to [a] or [ɐ] preceding velar fricatives: /sɛ́x/ occurs as [sɐ́x]; séx
- /o/ may occur as unrounded [ɤ] when preceding unrounded vowels in a stem: /ɮóʔɑ́hɑ̀ːɮ/ occurs as [ɮɤ́ʔɑ́hɑ̀ːɮ]; ló’áhaal ‘he's walking around’

=== Consonants ===
The consonants of the Tanacross practical orthography are shown below. This practical orthography follows standard Athabaskan conventions, in particular, stops and affricates are grouped together phonologically. Also, voiceless unaspirated stops/affricates consonants are indicated using, for the most part, the IPA symbols for voiced consonants, while voiceless aspirated consonants are indicated using the IPA symbols for voiceless consonants. Note that in coda position the unaspirated/aspirated distinction reverts to a voiceless/voiced distinction, providing further motivation for the choice of symbols in the practical orthography.

		Labial	Alveolar		Dental	Lateral	Palatal	Velar	Glottal
Plosive/ Affricate	unaspirated		t ⟨d⟩	t͜s ⟨dz⟩	t͜θ ⟨ddh⟩	t͜ɬ ⟨dl⟩	t͜ʃ ⟨j⟩	k ⟨g⟩	ʔ ⟨'⟩
Plosive/ Affricate	aspirated		tʰ ⟨t⟩	t͡sʰ ⟨ts⟩	t͡θʰ ⟨tth⟩	t͡ɬʰ ⟨tl⟩	t͡ʃʰ ⟨ch⟩	kʰ ⟨k⟩	
Plosive/ Affricate	ejective		tʼ ⟨t'⟩	t͡sʼ ⟨ts'⟩	t͡θʼ ⟨tth'⟩	t͡ɬʼ ⟨tl'⟩	t͡ʃʼ ⟨ch'⟩	kʼ ⟨k'⟩	
Fricative	voiced			z ⟨z⟩	ð ⟨dh⟩	ɮ ⟨l⟩	ʒ ⟨zh⟩	ɣ ⟨gh⟩	
Fricative	semi-voiced			z̥ ⟨s̲⟩	ð̥ ⟨t̲h̲⟩	ɮ̊ ⟨ł̲⟩	ʒ̊ ⟨s̲h̲⟩	ɣ̊ ⟨x̲⟩	
Fricative	voiceless			s ⟨s⟩	θ ⟨th⟩	ɬ ⟨ł⟩	ʃ ⟨sh⟩	x ⟨x⟩	h ⟨h⟩
Sonorant	voiced	m ⟨m⟩	n ⟨n⟩				j ⟨y⟩		
Sonorant	voiceless		n̥ ⟨nh⟩				j̊ ⟨yh⟩		

=== Semi-voiced fricatives ===
One of the distinguishing features of Tanacross is the presence of so-called semi-voiced fricatives, a unique type of segment which appear to begin voiceless and transition to fully voiced. Acoustically, semi-voiced fricatives are characterized by lower intensity of high-frequency frication. Semi-voiced fricatives occur in stem-initial position in lieu of fully voiced fricatives. Even though they are essentially allophonic variants of the voiced fricatives, semi-voiced fricatives are indicated in the practical orthography via an underscore beneath the corresponding voiceless segment.

łii	'dog'
shł̲ǐig'	'my dog'

=== Tones ===
There are five tones in Tanacross: low, high, rising, falling and extra high (e.g. /ó ò ǒ ô ő/ for /o/). The extra high tone has more restricted distribution, and is seen primarily in negation.

	IPA	Spelling	English
Low	tʰùːʔ nɛ̀n ʒɑ̀ː	tuu nen zhaa	“water” “you” “sky”
High	túʔ nɛ́nʔ kʰónʔ	dú’ nén’ kón’	“and/also” “land” “fire”
Rising	xĩ̌ːθ tsʼɛ̌tʔ tʃʰǒɣʔ	xį̌įth ts’ěd’ chǒgh’	“raft” “blanket” “quill”
Falling	nûːn tʃêk mɑ̂ːɣ	nûun jêg mâagh	“animal” “berry” “shore”
Extra high	ɛ̀hʒɑ̋ːd͡ð nɛ́kʔẽ̋ːj	ehzhá́ddh neg’ę̋ę̋y	“not snowing” “not see it”

==== Tones in the orthography ====
In the orthography, tones may be marked for high (á), rising (ǎ), falling (â) or extra-high (á́) tone. Low tone is unmarked. In case of long vowels, tone is marked on the first vowel of the digraph only, for instance ⟨áa⟩ for /ɑ́ː/, ⟨âa⟩ for /ɑ̂ː/, ⟨ę̌ę⟩ for /ẽ̌ː/ and so forth.

=== Syllable structure ===
In Tanacross, the maximal syllable shape is CVVCC, in which the final consonant is always glottal stop /ʔ/ (i.e. CVVCʔ).

Although sequences of two consonants occur word-initially, the first of these is considered syllabic. In Tanacross, /ɮ s ʃ x n/ may occur as syllabic consonants.

== Relationship to other languages ==
Tanacross is a member of the Athabaskan family of languages, a well-established genetic grouping whose members occupy three discontinuous areas of North America: the Northern group in northwestern Canada and Alaska, the Pacific Coast in northern California, Oregon, and southern Washington, and the Apachean group in the desert southwest of the continental United States. The seven Apachean languages include Navajo, the largest North American language in terms of number of speakers. Apachean is a very tightly related and well-defined branch. The Pacific Coast group is much less closely related than Apachean and is perhaps more of a geographic subgroup containing perhaps six languages. Of these only Tolowa and Hupa are still spoken today, and these only by a handful of speakers. Of the roughly 24 Northern Athabaskan languages, eleven are spoken in Alaska, three of which straddle the border with Canada.

Given the available data, it is difficult to discern linguistic subgroups within Northern Athabaskan. This is certainly true for the languages of the Tanana River drainages, which form a continuum extending from Lower Tanana in the west (downriver) to Upper Tanana in the east (upriver). Tanacross itself was not defined as a distinct language until the late 1960s (Krauss 1973a). The dialectology of this area has not been completely unraveled, but it is clear that Tanacross of course shares many features with neighboring languages and dialects, especially the Mentasta dialect of Ahtna, the (now extinct) Salcha dialect of Lower Tanana, the Tetlin dialect of Upper Tanana, and the Han language.

However, Tanacross is distinguished most dramatically from neighboring languages by the development of Proto-Athabaskan (PA) constricted vowels into high tone. In contrast, Lower Tanana, Hän and Upper Tanana developed low tone, while Ahtna either did not develop or lost tone. The Tanacross tone system remains active in the phonology and morphology of the language. Tanacross shares close linguistic, geographical and social ties with Upper Tanana to the east. In fact, the close social ties which have bound Tanacross with other groups in the upper Tanana drainage area argue for the definition of a Tanana Uplands language and culture area. This area would include all groups which have regularly participated in potlatch ceremonies with Tanacross, including the Upper Tanana of Tetlin, Northway and Beaver Creek; the Han of the vicinity of Eagle, Alaska and Dawson City, Yukon; and the Mentasta Ahtna of the Mentasta area. Mentasta is the most divergent dialect of Ahtna and shares many linguistic features with Tanacross and Upper Tanana. Due to extensive multilingualism within the Tanana Uplands area, any study of Tanacross must account for the larger socio-linguistic framework within which Tanacross is embedded.

== Early research ==
In addition to the strictly linguistic resources to be discussed below, Isaac (1988) and Simeone (1995) provide important cultural background on the Tanacross community. The former is an oral history told by Chief Andrew Isaac, the last traditional chief of Tanacross. Though much of the text has been translated into English, the translation maintains much of the speech style of the original Tanacross language. The text contains many references to Tanacross flora and fauna, as well as cultural items. Simeone's book is an ethnographic sketch written by an Episcopal lay worker who spent much of the 1970s living in Tanacross village. Ethnographies of the eastern Alaska Athabaskan region, though not specific to Tanacross, can be found in McKennan (1959) and Andrews (1975). De Laguna & McClellan's (1960) field notes also contain extensive ethnographic information.

The earliest written record by far of the Tanacross language is the "Copper River Kolchan" vocabulary recorded in Wrangell (1839). This list was probably collected at Nuchek in Prince William Sound, but its character is unmistakably Tanacross. Another short (three typescript pages) word list was collected by J.T. Geoghegan (Geoghegan & Geoghegan 1904). David Shinen compiled a somewhat longer Tanacross word list from Mary Charlie and Oscar Isaac in Tanacross village, and a portion of this list was later published under the heading "Nabesna" in Hoijer (1963). More substantive documentation of Tanacross began with exploratory fieldwork by Krauss, who first called it "transitional Tanana". In the early 1970s Nancy McRoy compiled some textual materials with speaker Mary Charlie and a short wordlist containing about 400 items, mostly nouns, as well as some basic literacy materials. In the late 1970s and early 1980s, Jeff Leer compiled further notes on grammatical paradigms and phonological features, including the three-way fricative voicing contrast. Marilyn Paul (1978) presents some notes compiled from a class taught by Leer at ANLC. Ron Scollon transcribed and translated a collection of texts from speaker Gaither Paul using a revised orthography which indicates tone. Kari has compiled a preliminary stem list based on information collected from several speakers in the 1980s, but tone is not marked. Alice Brean has compiled lexical and paradigmatic information. Minoura has compiled a short word list and information on tone. In spite of the various sources of lexical documentation, Krauss (p.c.) estimates than only twenty percent of the extant body of lexical information has been documented by linguists.

During the early 1990s John Ritter of the Yukon Native Language Center (YNLC) began a comprehensive study of Tanacross phonology in the early 1990s and developed a practical orthography. Tanacross speakers Irene Solomon Arnold and Jerry Isaac have participated in literacy workshops in Tok, Whitehorse and Dawson City, resulting in the production of literacy materials with accompanying cassette tapes. Solomon & Ritter (1997) provides crucial data for the description of tone phenomena. Phonology and morphology are described in Holton's 2000 University of California Santa Barbara dissertation. Semi-voiced fricatives are described by Holton (2001). The interaction of tone and intonation is described in Holton (2005). Additional sound recordings and field notes are available at YNLC and the Alaska Native Language Archive. Since 2000 Irene Solomon has worked as a language specialist at the Alaska Native Language Center and has collaborated on a number of projects with linguist Gary Holton, including a phrase book, a learners' dictionary, and a multimedia description of the sound system.
