= Goodpaster River =

River in Alaska, United States

- Location of the mouth of the Goodpaster River in Alaska

Location
- Country: United States
- State: Alaska
- Census Area: Southeast Fairbanks, Copper River

Physical characteristics
- Source
  - coordinates: 64°N 143°W
- Mouth: Tanana River
  - location: Big Delta
  - coordinates: 64°10′17″N 145°37′36″W

The Goodpaster River is an 91-mile (146 km) major tributary of the Tanana River in the U.S. state of Alaska. Its name in the Middle Tanana dialect of the Lower Tanana language is Jiiz Cheeg. Goodpaster River is a stream located just 6.6 miles from Big Delta, in Southeast Fairbanks Census Area.

The older glacial record in the Yukon-Tanana upland is found in the Goodpaster River Valley where records of at least three older glaciations are found, the oldest estimated to be Late Tertiary.

The structure of the Goodpaster River Bridge consists of six 21-m simple spans.

== Naming ==
The stream was called Goodpaster River by Lieutenant Allen "in honor of the Goodpaster family of Kentucky." The two stream names were transposed by later map makers. Alternate names for this stream includes North Fork Goodpaster River and Volkmar River.

== Natives ==
The area of Goodpaster River and Big Delta, Delta River (incl. Delta Junction and Deltana) is homeland of the Delta-Goodpaster or Big Delta-Goodpaster band of the Middle Tanana of the Tanana Athabaskans. The Goodpaster River to be a natural break in the Tanana Athabaskan language area, separating upriver speakers of the Tanacross and Upper Tanana languages from the Lower (and Middle) Tanana speakers living farther downriver.

== Fishing ==
Catch and release king salmon fishing only is allowed from the mouth of the river to a marker 25 miles (40 km) upstream. The Goodpaster is accessible only by boat; launch points are at the Tanana River near Delta Junction or Clearwater Lake).

== Mining ==
Only a few thousand ounces of gold from placer mines, and a few hundred ounces from lode gold mines were produced from the Goodpaster district before the discovery of Pogo. The district is east of the Fairbanks and south of the Circle district. The Pogo mine, is located in the Goodpaster River Valley.

== See also ==
- List of rivers of Alaska
