= Alaska Gateway School District =

American public school district

Location
- Eastern interior of Alaska Tok, United States, Alaska

District information
- Type: Public school district
- Schools: 7
- NCES District ID: 0200050

Students and staff
- Students: 381
- Teachers: 30.50
- Staff: 57.94
- Student–teacher ratio: 12.49

Other information
- Website: www.agsd.us

The Alaska Gateway School District is a public school district based in Tok, Alaska (USA).

The district covers approximately 28,000 square miles (73,000 km^{2}) in the eastern interior of Alaska, extending north from the Alaska Range to the Yukon River and Canada–United States border. Distances between the central office in Tok and outlying schools range from 12 to 173 miles (19 to 278 km).

== Schools ==
There are seven schools in the Alaska Gateway School District as well as a district-wide Correspondence School.

- Dot Lake School (K-12; Dot Lake)
- Eagle School (K-12; Eagle)
- Mentasta Lake Katie John School (K-12; Mentasta Lake)
- Walter Northway School (K-12; Northway)
- Tanacross School (K-8; Tanacross)
- Tok School (K-12; Tok)
- Tetlin School (K-12; Tetlin)
- AGSD Correspondence Study

== Enrollment ==
2007–2008 school year: 411 students
2006–2007 school year: 421 students
2005–2006 school year: 427 students
2004–2005 school year: 448 students
2003–2004 school year: 502 students

== Demographics ==
There were a total of 411 students enrolled in the Alaska Gateway School District during the 2007–2008 school year. Of these, 405 were enrolled in grades K-12 and 6 were pre-elementary (early childhood) students. The racial makeup of the district was 58.15% Alaska Native, 38.44% White, 1.22% Asian, 0.97% African American, 0.97% Hispanic, and 0.24% American Indian.

== See also ==
- List of school districts in Alaska
