= Upper Tanana language =

Athabaskan language of Alaska, US

Upper Tanana
- Nee'aanèegn'
- Native to: United States, Canada
- Region: Alaska (upper Tanana River, Yukon
- Ethnicity: c. 340 Tanana (1997–2007)
- Native speakers: (c. 110 cited 1997–2007)
- Language family: Na-Dené: Athabaskan; Northern Athabaskan; Upper Tanana
- Writing system: Latin (Northern Athabaskan alphabet)

Official status
- Official language in: Alaska

Language codes
- ISO 639-3: tau
- Glottolog: uppe1437
- ELP: Upper Tanana
- Upper Tanana is classified as Critically Endangered by the UNESCO Atlas of the World's Languages in Danger.

Upper Tanana (also known as Tabesna, Nabesna or Nee'aanèegn') is an endangered Athabaskan language spoken in eastern Interior Alaska, United States, mainly in the villages of Northway, Tetlin, and Tok, and adjacent areas of the Canadian territory of Yukon. In 2000 there were fewer than 100 speakers, and the language was no longer being acquired by children.

== Overview ==
Upper Tanana shows near mutual-intelligibility with neighboring Tanacross but differs in several phonological features. In particular, Upper Tanana has low tone as a reflex of Proto-Athabaskan constriction, where Tanacross has high tone. Upper Tanana also has an extra vowel phoneme and has developed diphthongs through loss of final consonants.

Traditionally, five main dialects have been recognized.

The main Upper Tanana speaking communities today are located in the Alaskan communities of Northway and Tetlin and in the Canadian community of Beaver Creek.

== Name ==
There are actually two Tanana languages, the first being Lower Tanana, or Minto, and the second being Upper Tanana, or Nabesna. The original name for the Upper Tanana language was Nee'aaneegn'.

== Language today ==
As of the beginning of the 21st century, roughly 100 people still speak the language. The demographic make up of the Upper Tanana speakers are above the age 60. The language is no longer taught to children of this current generation, therefore, the extinction of Upper Tanana is in the near future. In the 1960s, Paul G. Milanowski and Alfred John worked together to establish a writing system to produce several booklets and school dictionaries to assist in bilingual programs.

== Geography ==
Upper Tanana is the eastern part of Alaska that also shares the same location as the speakers of the Tanacross Language. This location reaches from the Wrangell Mountain range across to Joseph Creek, and west of the Tanana rivers. The Tanana Rivers divides this area through a string of smaller rivers and creeks. Upper Tanana is mainly spoken in Tetlin and Northway.

=== Dialects ===
Upper Tanana is categorised into five separate dialects. The first dialect is spoken by the Tetlin band, which has up to 20 known speakers. The other four dialect are spoken by the smaller bands that are located more upriver. The first is Nabesna with two known speakers, the second dialect is Northway with 20 known speakers, the third dialect is Scottie Creek which no longer has any known speakers, and the last is Beaver Creek dialect has one known speaker, but there is a high potential for a few more.

=== Official status ===
The state of Alaska recognized Upper Tanana, along with 19 other native Alaskan languages, as one of the official languages of the state in 2014.

== Phonology ==
The Upper Tanana writing system consists of 13 vowels, 34 consonants, and five tones.

=== Consonants ===
		Bilabial	Dental	Alveolar			Post- alveolar		Palatal	Velar	Glottal
		Bilabial	Dental	plain	sibilant	lateral	plain	pal.	Palatal	Velar	Glottal
Plosive/ Affricate	plain	p	tθ	t	ts	tɬ	tʃ			k	ʔ
Plosive/ Affricate	aspirated		tθʰ	tʰ	tsʰ	tɬʰ	tʃʰ			kʰ	
Plosive/ Affricate	ejective		tθʼ	tʼ	tsʼ	tɬʼ	tʃʼ			kʼ	
Fricative	voiceless		θ		s	ɬ	ʃ	ʃʲ	ç	x	h
Fricative	voiced		ð								
Sonorant	voiced	m		n		l			j		
Sonorant	voiceless			n̥							

=== Vowels ===
	Front	Central	Back	
Close	i iː		u uː	
Mid	e eː	ɘ ɘː	ʌ	o oː
Open		a aː		

=== Tone ===
The Upper Tanana has a range of five separate tones.

Tone	Letter	Example	Meaning
low tone	e	nen	you
high tone	é	nén'	land
falling tone	ê	jêg	berries
rising tone	ě	ts'ěd'	blanket
extra-high tone	ő	ch'ekől	n/a

== Vocabulary ==
Examples of words translated from English to Upper Tanana.

English	Upper Tanana
bear	sh'oo
berry	Jign
bunny	Gah
dog	łii
salmon	łuuk
