= Minto, Alaska =

- CDP
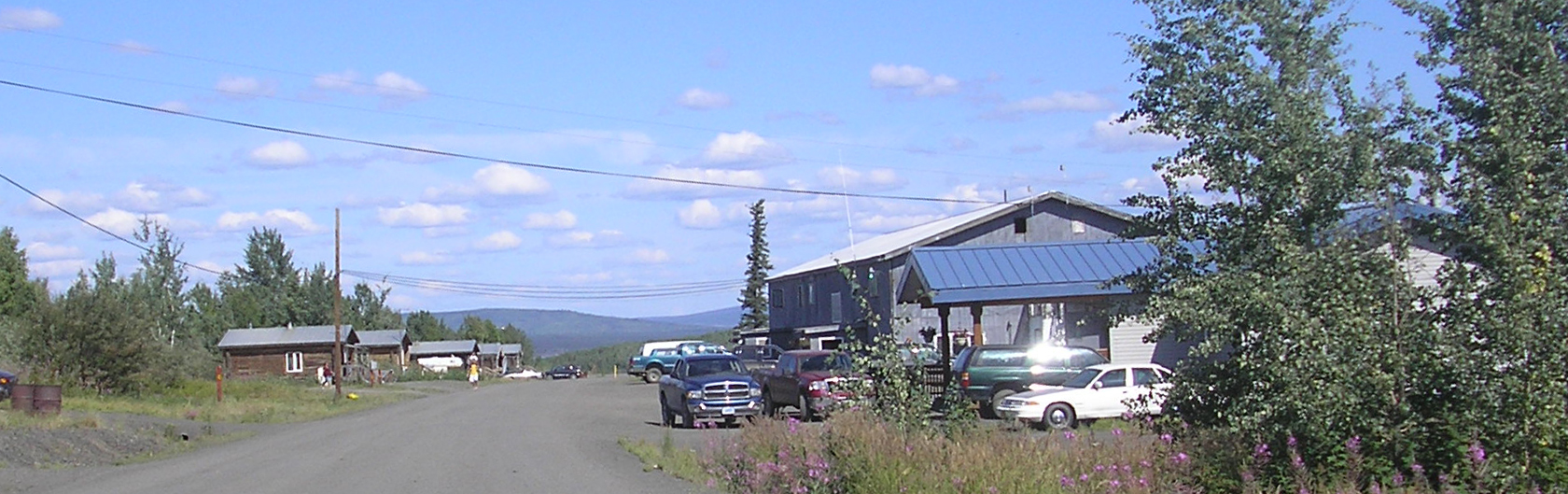
- Minto, Alaska

- Location of Minto in the state of Alaska, United States
- Coordinates: 65°9′28″N 149°22′12″W
- Country: United States
- State: Alaska
- Census Area: Yukon-Koyukuk

Government
  - State senator: Click Bishop (R)
  - State rep.: Mike Cronk (R)

Area
  - Total: 136.17 sq mi (352.68 km^{2})
  - Land: 132.61 sq mi (343.45 km^{2})
  - Water: 3.56 sq mi (9.23 km^{2})

Population (2020)
  - Total: 150
  - Density: 1.1/sq mi (0.44/km^{2})
- Time zone: UTC-9 (Alaska (AKST))
  - Summer (DST): UTC-8 (AKDT)
- ZIP code: 99758
- Area code: 907
- FIPS code: 02-49530

Minto (Lower Tanana: Menhti) is a census-designated place (CDP) in Yukon-Koyukuk Census Area, Alaska, United States. As of the 2020 census, the population of the CDP is 150, down from 210 in 2010. The name is an anglicized version of the Lower Tanana Athabaskan name Menhti mən̥tʰi, meaning 'among the lakes'. After repeated flooding the village was relocated to its present location in 1969. The former village site is now known as Old Minto.

== Geography ==
Minto is an Athabaskan village located at the end of the Minto Spur Road, which comes off the Elliot Highway. It is located at 65°9′28″N 149°22′12″W (65.157885, −149.369916). The village is located on a bluff above the Tolovana River flats, which contain several lakes formed by the flow of the river through low-lying areas.

According to the United States Census Bureau, the CDP has a total area of 138.6 square miles (359 km^{2}), of which, 135.1 square miles (350 km^{2}) of it is land and 3.6 square miles (9.3 km^{2}) of it (2.58%) is water.

== Demographics ==
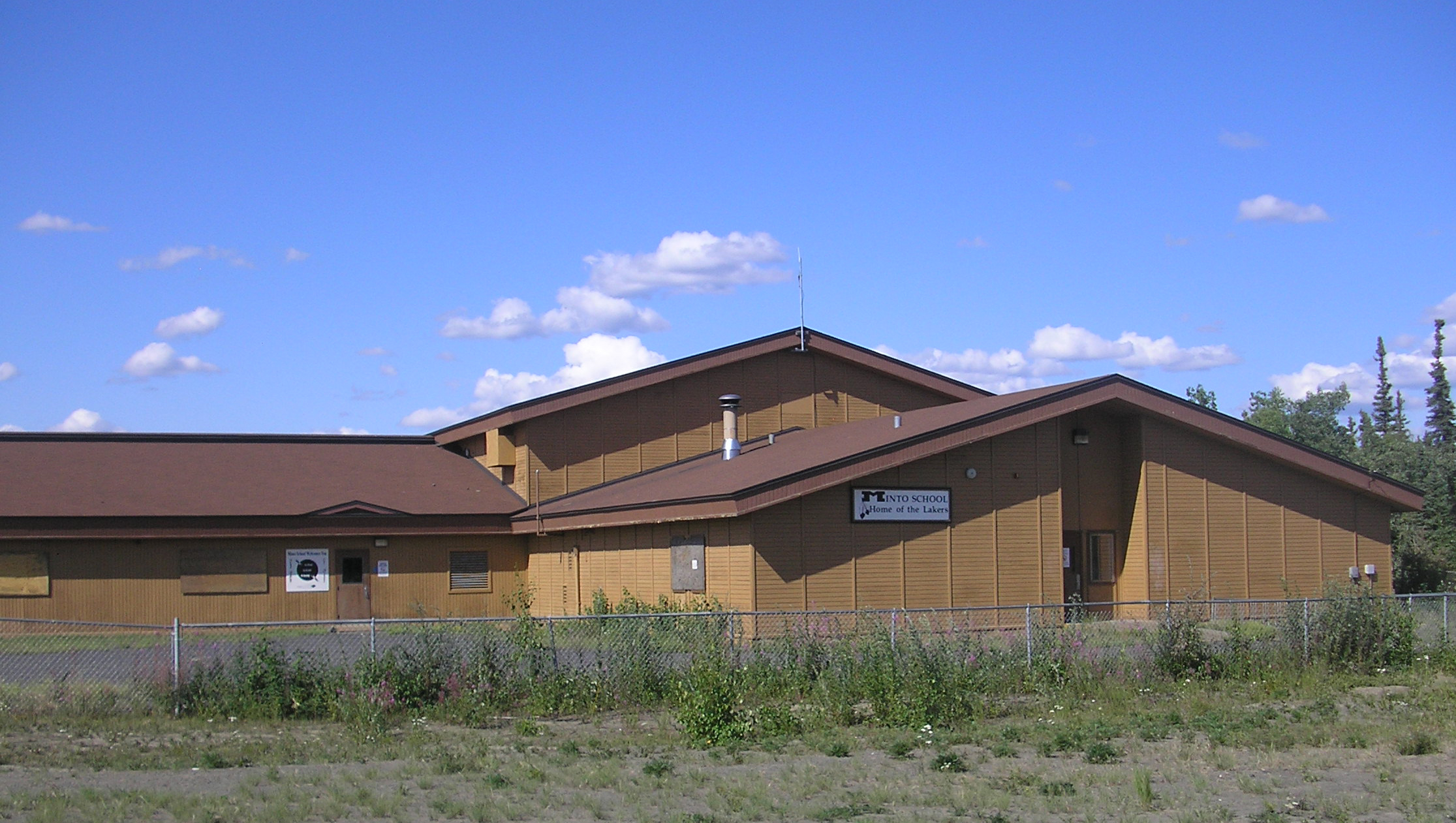
Minto school's athletic teams are known as the Lakers due to the town's proximity to several lakes formed by the flow of the Tolovana River.

Historical population
Census	Pop.	Note	%±
1970	168		—
1980	153		−8.9%
1990	218		42.5%
2000	258		18.3%
2010	210		−18.6%
2020	150		−28.6%
U.S. Decennial Census

Minto first appeared on the 1920 U.S. Census as an unincorporated native village. That village was located along the Tanana River, now known as Old Minto. It had a population of 55 in 1920, it did not report in 1930, 135 in 1940, 152 in 1950 and 161 in 1960. Following flooding of Old Minto, the new village assumed the name of "Minto" beginning with the 1970 U.S. Census. In 1980 it was made a census-designated place (CDP).

As of the census of 2000, there were 258 people, 74 households, and 54 families residing in the CDP. The population density was 1.9 inhabitants per square mile (0.73/km^{2}). There were 99 housing units at an average density of 0.7 per square mile (0.27/km^{2}). The racial makeup of the CDP was 7.75% White, 91.86% Native American, and 0.39% from two or more races.

There were 74 households, out of which 39.2% had children under the age of 18 living with them, 33.8% were married couples living together, 21.6% had a female householder with no husband present, and 27.0% were non-families. 25.7% of all households were made up of individuals, and 9.5% had someone living alone who was 65 years of age or older. The average household size was 3.49 and the average family size was 4.15.

In the CDP, the age distribution of the population shows 38.8% under the age of 18, 11.6% from 18 to 24, 21.7% from 25 to 44, 18.2% from 45 to 64, and 9.7% who were 65 years of age or older. The median age was 25 years. For every 100 females, there were 113.2 males. For every 100 females age 18 and over, there were 129.0 males.

The median income for a household in the CDP was $21,250, and the median income for a family was $37,500. Males had a median income of $28,750 versus $28,125 for females. The per capita income for the CDP was $9,639. About 18.2% of families and 26.4% of the population were below the poverty line, including 25.0% of those under the age of eighteen and 12.5% of those 65 or over.

== Transportation ==
Although a small community, it has a small landing strip called Minto Airport. It gives direct flights to Fairbanks. It is also served by the Old Minto Road, visible on Google Maps and on Google Earth imagery; it connects to the Elliot Highway, which itself runs between Fairbanks and Manley Hot Springs.

== History ==
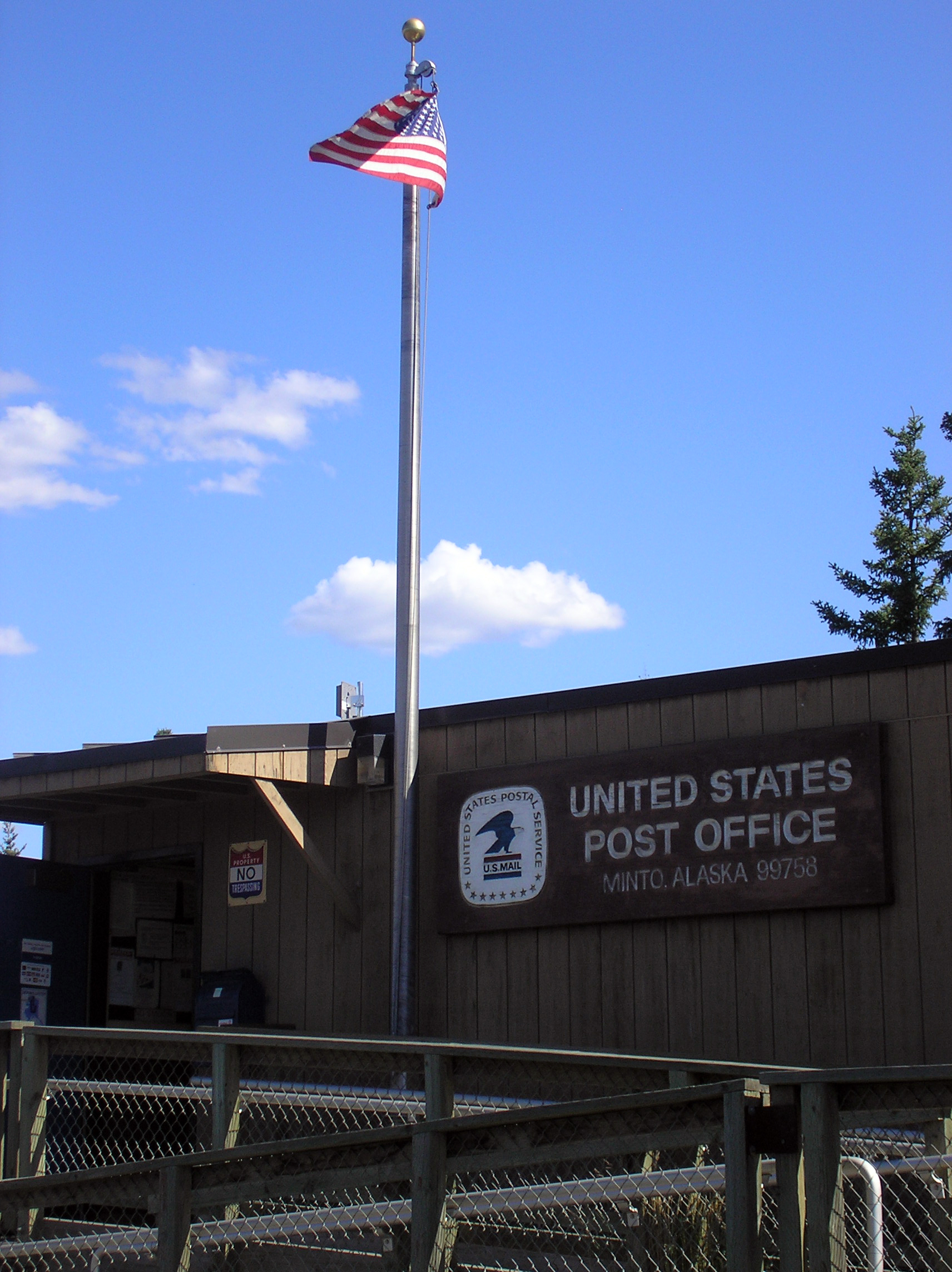
Minto's post office is seen in July 2009.

Minto is in the western part of traditional Tanana Athabaskan territory. During the late 1800s, some members of the nomadic Minto band traveled to Tanana, Rampart and Fort Yukon to trade furs for manufactured goods, tea and flour. After gold was discovered north of Fairbanks in 1902, steamboats began to travel on the Tanana River, bringing goods and people into the area. Old Minto, on the banks of the Tanana River, became a permanent settlement when some members of the Minto band built log cabins there. Other families lived there seasonally in tents. A school was established in 1937, but most families still did not live in Minto year-round until the 1950s. The people from the Minto band were eventually joined by families from Nenana, Toklat, Crossjacket and Chena.

Minto was relocated in 1969 due to repeated flooding and erosion. The present site is 65 km (40 mi) north of the old site. The new site had been used as a fall and winter camp since the early 1900s. New housing and a new school were completed by 1971.

The Old Minto Family Recovery Camp is a rustic treatment center operated by the Tanana Chiefs Conference relocated away from the old river edge village site. A residential program, it incorporates daily group and individual counseling for drug and alcohol addictions with traditional lifestyle activities and Athabascan cultural immersion. The old village site is used for seasonal celebrations including by the Cultural Heritage and Education Institute which provides curriculum elements in the school at New Minto.

== Notable person ==
Traditional Chief Peter John (1900–2003)

== Education ==
The Yukon–Koyukuk School District operates the Minto School.

== Language ==
The traditional language of Minto is Lower Tanana, one of eleven Athabaskan languages spoken in Alaska. As of 2010, "Speakers who grew up with Lower Tanana as their first language can be found only in the 250-person village of Minto."

== See also ==
- Minto City, British Columbia
- Mount Minto, Yukon
