= Dot Lake Village, Alaska =

- CDP
- Location within the state of Alaska
- Coordinates: 63°39′1″N 144°2′34″W
- Country: United States
- State: Alaska
- Census Area: Southeast Fairbanks

Government
  - State senator: Click Bishop (R)
  - State rep.: Mike Cronk (R)

Area
  - Total: 4.37 sq mi (11.33 km^{2})
  - Land: 4.37 sq mi (11.33 km^{2})
  - Water: 0 sq mi (0.00 km^{2})

Population (2020)
  - Total: 23
  - Density: 5.3/sq mi (2.03/km^{2})
- Time zone: UTC-9 (Alaska (AKST))
  - Summer (DST): UTC-8 (AKDT)
- Area code: 907
- FIPS code: 02-19750

Dot Lake Village (Tanacross: Kelt’aaddh Menn’) is a census-designated place (CDP) in Southeast Fairbanks Census Area, Alaska, United States. As of the 2020 census, Dot Lake Village had a population of 23.

== Geography ==
Dot Lake Village is located at 63°39′1″N 144°2′34″W (63.650261, -144.042721).

According to the United States Census Bureau, the CDP has a total area of 3.6 square miles (9.3 km^{2}), all of it land.

== Demographics ==
Historical population
Census	Pop.	Note	%±
2000	38		—
2010	62		63.2%
2020	23		−62.9%
U.S. Decennial Census

Dot Lake Village first appeared on the 2000 U.S. Census as a census-designated place (CDP). It was subdivided from Dot Lake CDP, which surrounds Dot Lake Village, in order to establish a separate native village.

As of the census of 2000, there were 38 people, 15 households, and 10 families residing in the CDP. The population density was 10.5 inhabitants per square mile (4.1/km^{2}). There were 25 housing units at an average density of 6.9 units per square mile (2.7 units/km^{2}). The racial makeup of the CDP was 23.68% White, 57.89% Native American, and 18.42% from two or more races.

There were 15 households, out of which 53.3% had children under the age of 18 living with them, 33.3% were married couples living together, 13.3% had a female householder with no husband present, and 26.7% were non-families. 26.7% of all households were made up of individuals, and 13.3% had someone living alone who was 65 years of age or older. The average household size was 2.53 and the average family size was 3.00.

In the CDP, the population was spread out, with 34.2% under the age of 18, 7.9% from 18 to 24, 21.1% from 25 to 44, 26.3% from 45 to 64, and 10.5% who were 65 years of age or older. The median age was 32 years. For every 100 females, there were 171.4 males. For every 100 females age 18 and over, there were 127.3 males.

The median income for a household in the CDP was $16,250, and the median income for a family was $16,667. Males had a median income of $28,750 versus $0 for females. The per capita income for the CDP was $7,476. None of the families and 19.0% of the population were below the poverty line. None of those under the age of 18 or above the age of 65 were living below the poverty line.
