= Dot Lake, Alaska =

Dot Lake, Alaska Kelt’aaddh Menn’
- CDP
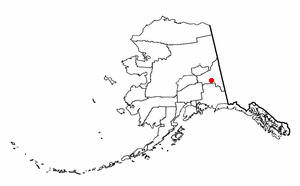
- Location of Dot Lake, Alaska
- Coordinates: 63°39′31″N 144°3′57″W
- Country: United States
- State: Alaska
- Census Area: Southeast Fairbanks

Government
  - State senator: Click Bishop (R)
  - State rep.: Mike Cronk (R)

Area
  - Total: 295.77 sq mi (766.03 km^{2})
  - Land: 294.99 sq mi (764.01 km^{2})
  - Water: 0.78 sq mi (2.03 km^{2})

Population (2020)
  - Total: 21
  - Density: 0.078/sq mi (0.03/km^{2})
- Time zone: UTC-9 (Alaska (AKST))
  - Summer (DST): UTC-8 (AKDT)
- Area code: 907
- FIPS code: 02-19720

Dot Lake (Tanacross: Kelt’aaddh Menn’) is a census-designated place (CDP) in Southeast Fairbanks Census Area, Alaska, United States. It is located on the Alaska Highway between Delta Junction and Tok. As of the 2020 census, Dot Lake had a population of 21.

== Geography ==
Dot Lake is located at 63°39′31″N 144°3′57″W (63.658742, -144.065816).

According to the United States Census Bureau, the CDP has a total area of 279.1 square miles (723 km^{2}), of which, 278.0 square miles (720 km^{2}) of it is land and 1.1 square miles (2.8 km^{2}) of it (0.38%) is water.

== Demographics ==
Historical population
Census	Pop.	Note	%±
1960	56		—
1970	42		−25.0%
1980	67		59.5%
1990	70		4.5%
2000	19		−72.9%
2010	13		−31.6%
2020	21		61.5%
U.S. Decennial Census

Dot Lake first appeared on the 1960 U.S. Census as an unincorporated village. It was made a census-designated place (CDP) in 1980. Dot Lake Village, a native (Alaskan Indian) village within the Dot Lake CDP, was carved off as a separate CDP in 2000, which accounted for the substantial drop in population.

As of the census of 2000, there were 19 people, 10 households, and 6 families residing in the CDP. The population density was 0.1 inhabitants per square mile (0.039/km^{2}). There were 19 housing units at an average density of 0.1 per square mile (0.039/km^{2}). The racial makeup of the CDP was 84.21% White, and 15.79% from two or more races.

There were 10 households, out of which 20.0% had children under the age of 18 living with them, 50.0% were married couples living together, 10.0% had a female householder with no husband present, and 40.0% were non-families. 40.0% of all households were made up of individuals, and 20.0% had someone living alone who was 65 years of age or older. The average household size was 1.90 and the average family size was 2.50.

In the CDP, the population was spread out, with 15.8% under the age of 18, 5.3% from 18 to 24, 26.3% from 25 to 44, 42.1% from 45 to 64, and 10.5% who were 65 years of age or older. The median age was 46 years. For every 100 females, there were 90.0 males. For every 100 females age 18 and over, there were 77.8 males.

The median income for a household in the CDP was $13,750, and the median income for a family was $62,500. Males had a median income of $46,250 versus $0 for females. The per capita income for the CDP was $19,406. There were no families and 5.6% of the population living below the poverty line, including no under eighteens and 33.3% of those over 64.

== Education ==
Dot Lake is part of the Alaska Gateway School District. Dot Lake School, a K-12 campus, serves community students.
