= Salcha River =

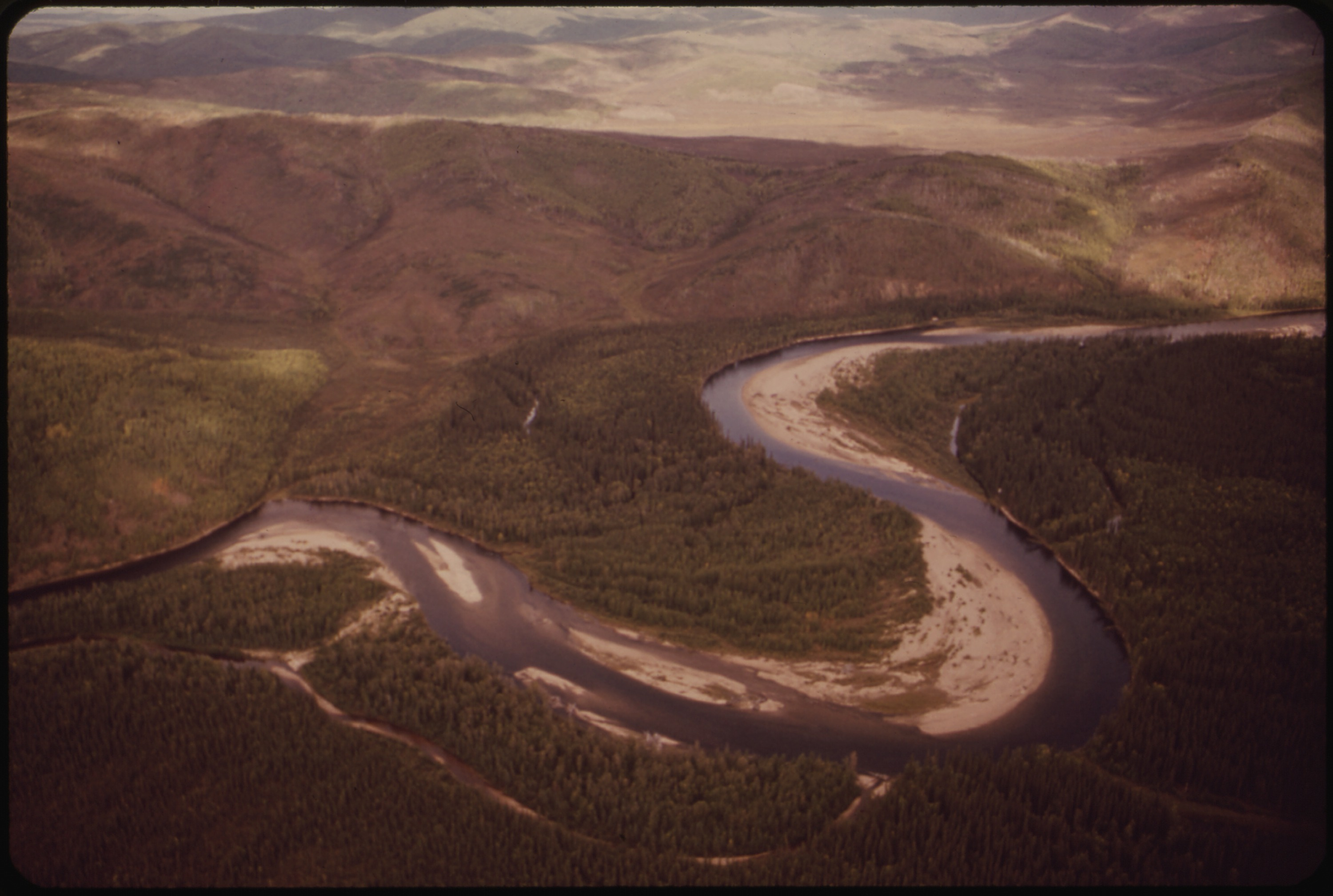
- Salcha River in 1973

- Location of the mouth of the Salcha River in Alaska
- Native name: Sołchaget (Lower Tanana)

Location
- Country: United States
- State: Alaska
- Borough: Fairbanks North Star

Physical characteristics
- Source: Tanana Hills
  - location: slightly south of Steese National Conservation Area, northeastern Fairbanks North Star Borough
  - coordinates: 65°04′23″N 143°54′58″W
  - elevation: 4,054 ft (1,236 m)
- Mouth: Tanana River
  - location: 33 miles (53 km) southeast of Fairbanks
  - coordinates: 64°28′00″N 146°58′44″W
  - elevation: 640 ft (200 m)
- Length: 125 mi (201 km)
- Basin size: 2,170 sq mi (5,600 km^{2})
- Discharge
  - location: 2 miles (3.2 km) from the mouth
  - average: 1,601 cu ft/s (45.3 m^{3}/s)
  - minimum: 60 cu ft/s (1.7 m^{3}/s)
  - maximum: 97,000 cu ft/s (2,700 m^{3}/s)

The Salcha River (Lower Tanana: Sołchaget) is a 125-mile (201 km) tributary of the Tanana River in the U.S. state of Alaska. Rising in the eastern part of the Fairbanks North Star Borough east of Fort Wainwright, it flows generally west-southwest to meet the larger river at Aurora Lodge, 33 miles (53 km) southeast of Fairbanks.

The Salcha drains an area of 2,170 square miles (5,620 km^{2}), making it the second-largest tributary of the Tanana. The Trans-Alaska Pipeline crosses under the Salcha approximately 12 miles (19 km) east of the mouth of the river.

== Recreation ==
Accessible by boat or on foot from the Richardson Highway, which crosses the lower river near the mouth, the Salcha River is a popular sports-fishing stream. The main species are king salmon, caught mostly near the mouth, and Arctic grayling, caught mostly further upstream.

Catch and release fishing for Chinook salmon averaging 20 to 25 pounds (9 to 11 kg) can be good on this river. Summer-run chum salmon and fall-run coho salmon also frequent the Salcha, as do smaller numbers of northern pike.

The Salcha River State Recreation Site is next to the Salcha River at milepost 323.3 of the Richardson Highway. The Alaska Division of Parks and Outdoor Recreation manages the 61-acre (25 ha) site, about 40 miles (64 km) southeast of Fairbanks. Amenities include six campsites, water, toilets, picnic sites, a boat launch, and a public-use cabin. Cross-country skiing and snowmobiling are among the possible winter activities near the site. The park is known to be crowded on holiday weekends.

== See also ==
- List of rivers of Alaska
- Salcha, Alaska
