= Healy Lake, Alaska =

Healy Lake, Alaska Mendees Cheeg (Tanacross)
- CDP
- Location within Alaska Location within North America Location within Earth
- Coordinates: 63°59′20″N 144°42′29″W
- Country: United States
- State: Alaska
- Census Area: Southeast Fairbanks

Government
  - State senator: Click Bishop (R)
  - State rep.: Mike Cronk (R)

Area
  - Total: 75.04 sq mi (194.36 km^{2})
  - Land: 66.76 sq mi (172.91 km^{2})
  - Water: 8.28 sq mi (21.45 km^{2})

Population (2020)
  - Total: 24
  - Density: 0.36/sq mi (0.14/km^{2})
- Time zone: UTC-9 (Alaska (AKST))
  - Summer (DST): UTC-8 (AKDT)
- ZIP code: 99737
- Area code: 907
- FIPS code: 02-32310

Healy Lake (Mendees Cheeg in the Healy Lake-Joseph Village dialect of Tanacross Athabascan, meaning "body of water, with an outlet") is a census-designated place (CDP) in Southeast Fairbanks Census Area, Alaska, United States. As of the 2020 census, Healy Lake had a population of 24.

== Geography ==
Healy Lake is located at 63°59′20″N 144°42′29″W (63.988835, -144.708173). The Healy Lake Village is located roughly 29 miles east of Delta Junction, Alaska.

According to the United States Census Bureau, the CDP has a total area of 74.3 square miles (192 km^{2}), of which, 66.2 square miles (171 km^{2}) of it is land and 8.1 square miles (21 km^{2}) of it (10.86%) is water. The lake is about 5 miles long.

== Demographics ==
Historical population
Census	Pop.	Note	%±
1980	33		—
1990	47		42.4%
2000	37		−21.3%
2010	13		−64.9%
2020	24		84.6%
U.S. Decennial Census

Healy Lake first appeared on the 1980 U.S. Census as a census-designated place (CDP).

As of the census of 2000, there were 37 people, 13 households, and 9 families residing in the CDP. The population density was 0.6 inhabitants per square mile (0.23/km^{2}). There were 21 housing units at an average density of 0.3 per square mile (0.12/km^{2}). The racial makeup of the CDP was 27.03% White and 72.97% Native American.

Of the 13 households, 53.8% had children under the age of 18 living with them, 38.5% were married couples living together, 7.7% had a female householder with no husband present, and 23.1% were non-families. 15.4% of all households were made up of individuals, and none had someone living alone who was 65 years of age or older. The average household size was 2.85 and the average family size was 3.10.

In the CDP, the population was spread out, with 35.1% under the age of 18, 10.8% from 18 to 24, 40.5% from 25 to 44, 13.5% from 45 to 64, . The median age was 26 years. For every 100 females, there were 164.3 males. For every 100 females age 18 and over, there were 200.0 males.

The median income for a household in the CDP was $51,250, and the median income for a family was $53,750. Males had a median income of $25,417 versus $38,750 for females. The per capita income for the CDP was $18,127. There were 12.5% of families and 9.1% of the population living below the poverty line, including 5.3% of under eighteens and none of those over 64.

== Archaeology ==
Coordinates: 64°N, 144°45'W

Healy Lake Village is a large historic and prehistoric site located on the NE shore of Healy Lake, ca 200 km SE of Fairbanks and 50 km E of Delta Junction, Alaska. It is located near Tanana River, and the Healy River. Ancient artifacts recovered in the area demonstrate human occupation spanning as much as 11,000 years.

== Transportation ==
Healy Lake is not on the road system. The main way in or out is by air.

Healy Lake Airport
- IATA: HKB; ICAO: none

Summary
- Serves: Healy Lake, Alaska

Map
- Location of airport in Alaska

Runways
Direction	Length		Surface
Direction	ft	m	Surface
	2,700	823

Healy Lake Airport (IATA: HKB) is an airport serving Healy Lake. Scheduled airline passenger service at this airport is subsidized by the United States Department of Transportation via the Essential Air Service program.

=== Airline and destinations ===
The following airline offers scheduled passenger service at this airport:

Airlines	Destinations
Wright Air Service	Fairbanks

=== Statistics ===
Carrier shares: January – December 2013
Carrier	Passengers (arriving and departing)
40-Mile Air	60(100%)

Top domestic destinations: Jan. – Dec. 2013
Rank	City	Airport name & IATA code	Passengers	
Rank	City	Airport name & IATA code	2013	2012
1	Tok, AK	Tok Airport (TKJ)	10	10
2	Fairbanks, Alaska	Fairbanks International (FAI)	10	10

== See also ==
- Healy River Airport in Healy, Alaska (Denali Borough) at coordinates 63°52′03″N 148°58′08″W
