= Lower Tanana language =

Endangered Athabaskan language of Alaska

Lower Tanana
- Menhti Kenaga
- Native to: United States
- Region: Alaska (middle Yukon River, Koyukuk River)
- Ethnicity: 400 Tanana (2007)
- Native speakers: 1 (2020)
- Language family: Na-Dené: Athabaskan; Northern Athabaskan; Lower Tanana
- Writing system: Latin (Northern Athabaskan alphabet)

Official status
- Official language in: Alaska

Language codes
- ISO 639-3: taa
- Glottolog: lowe1425
- ELP: (Lower) Tanana

Lower Tanana (also Tanana and/or Middle Tanana) is an endangered language spoken in Interior Alaska in the lower Tanana River villages of Minto and Nenana. Of about 380 Tanana people in the two villages, about 30 still speak the language. As of 2010, "Speakers who grew up with Lower Tanana as their first language can be found only in the 250-person village of Minto." It is one of the large family of Athabaskan languages, also known as Dené.

The Athabaskan (or Dené) bands who formerly occupied a territory between the Salcha and the Goodpaster rivers spoke a distinct language that linguists term the Middle Tanana language.

== Dialects ==
- Toklat area dialect (Tutlʼot)
- Minto Flats-Nenana River dialect: Minto (Menhti) and Nenana (Nina Noʼ)
- Chena River dialect: Chena Village (Chʼenoʼ)
- Salcha River dialect: Salcha (Sol Chaget)

== Phonology ==
=== Consonants ===
		Labial	Dental	Alveolar			Post- alveolar	Retroflex	Palatal	Velar	Glottal
		Labial	Dental	plain	sibilant	lateral	Post- alveolar	Retroflex	Palatal	Velar	Glottal
Plosive	plain	p	tθ	t	ts	tɬ	tʃ	tʂ		k	ʔ
Plosive	aspirated		tθʰ	tʰ	tsʰ	tɬʰ	tʃʰ	tʂʰ		kʰ	
Plosive	ejective		tθʼ	tʼ	tsʼ	tɬʼ	tʃʼ	tʂʼ		kʼ	
Fricative	voiceless		θ		s	ɬ	ʃ			x	h
Fricative	voiced		ð		z					ɣ	
Sonorant		w		n		l			j		

=== Vowels ===
Vowel sounds in Tanana are /a æ ɪ~i ʊ~u ə/.

	Front	Central	Back
Close	ɪ ~ i		ʊ ~ u
Mid		ə	
Open	æ	a	

== Vocabulary samples ==
- dena "man"
- trʼaxa "woman"
- setseya "my grandfather"
- setsu "my grandmother"
- xwtʼana "clan"
- ddheł "mountain"
- tu "black bear"
- tsonee "brown bear"
- bedzeyh "caribou"
- łiga "dog"
- beligaʼ "his/her dog"
- kʼwyʼ "willow"
- katreth "moccasin"
- trʼiyh "canoe"
- yoyekoyh "Northern Lights"
- tena "trail"
- khwnʼa "river"
- t’eede gaay "girl" (Middle Tanana)

== Songs ==
In a 2008–2009 project, linguist Siri Tuttle of the University of Alaska's Native Language Center "worked with elders to translate and document song lyrics, some on file at the language center and some recorded during the project."

"The Minto dialect of Tanana ... allows speakers to occasionally change the number of syllables in longer words."

== Bibliography ==
- Charlie, Teddy (1992). Ode Setl'oghwnh Da': Long After I Am Gone. Fairbanks: Alaska Native Language Center. ISBN 1-55500-045-2.
- Kari, James; Charlie, Isabel; John, Peter; Alexander, Evelyn (1991), Lower Tanana Athabaskan Listening and Writing Exercises, Fairbanks: Alaska Native Language Center
- Tuttle, Siri (1998). Metrical and Tonal Structures in Tanana Athabaskan (Ph.D. thesis). University of Washington.
- Tuttle, Siri (2003), Archival Phonetics: Tone and Stress in Tanana Athabaskan, University of Alaska Fairbanks
