= Tetlin, Alaska =

Tetlin, Alaska Teełąy
- CDP
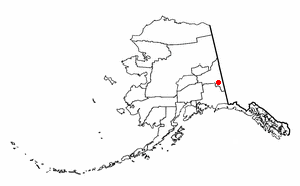
- Location of Tetlin, Alaska
- Coordinates: 63°8′16″N 142°31′28″W
- Country: United States
- State: Alaska
- Census Area: Southeast Fairbanks

Government
  - State senator: Click Bishop (R)
  - State rep.: Mike Cronk (R)

Area
  - Total: 69.13 sq mi (179.04 km^{2})
  - Land: 67.83 sq mi (175.68 km^{2})
  - Water: 1.30 sq mi (3.36 km^{2})

Population (2020)
  - Total: 126
  - Density: 1.9/sq mi (0.72/km^{2})
- Time zone: UTC-9 (Alaska (AKST))
  - Summer (DST): UTC-8 (AKDT)
- ZIP code: 99780
- Area code: 907
- FIPS code: 02-76590

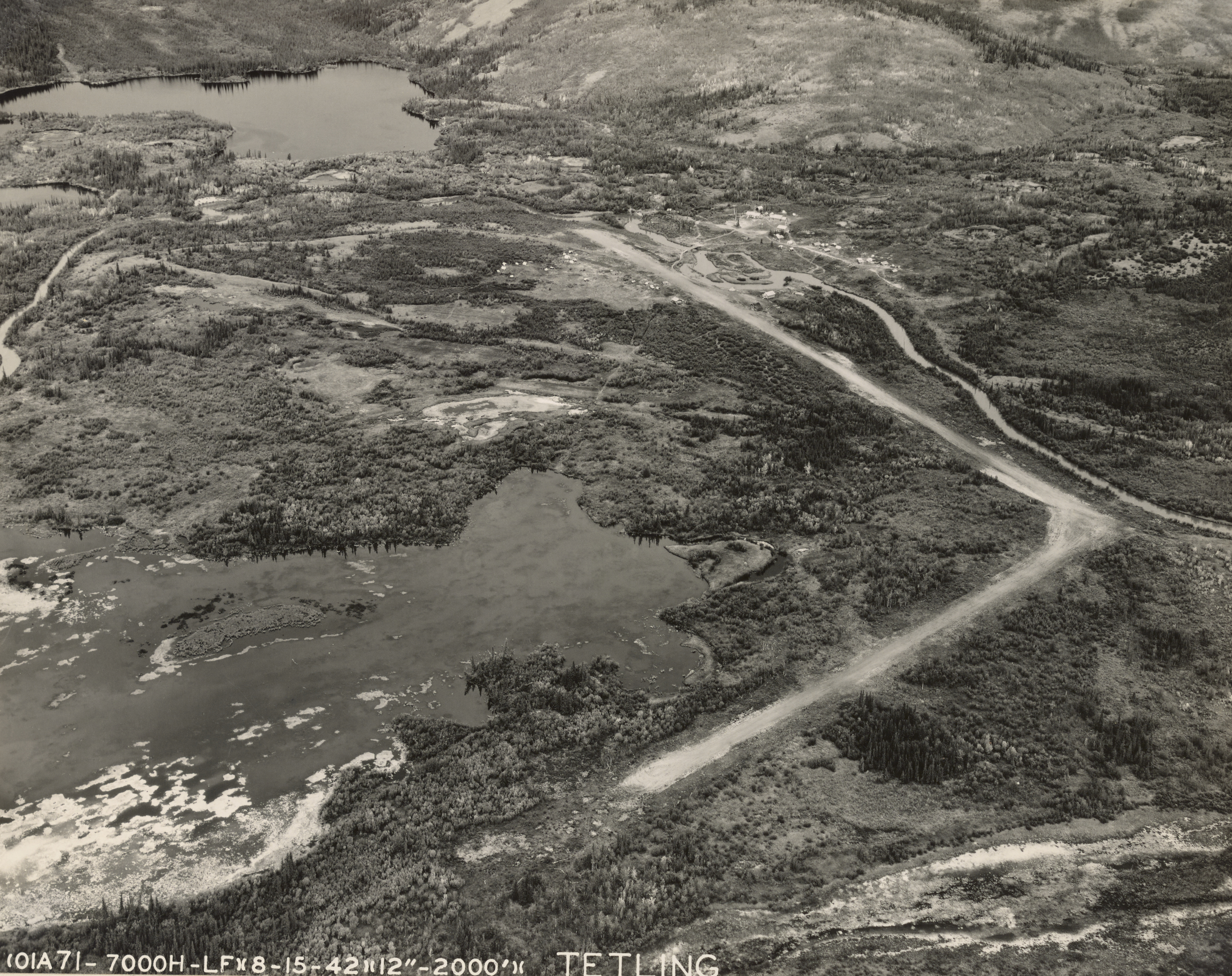
Tetlin in 1942

Tetlin (Upper Tanana: Teełąy) is a census-designated place (CDP) in Southeast Fairbanks Census Area, Alaska, United States. As of the 2020 census, Tetlin had a population of 126.

== Geography ==
Tetlin is located at 63°8′16″N 142°31′28″W (63.137840, -142.524451). Tetlin is located along the Tetlin River, between Tetlin Lake and the Tanana River, about 20 miles (32 km) southeast of Tok. It lies in the Tetlin National Wildlife Refuge. The village is connected by a dirt road to the Alaska Highway. The community is located in the Fairbanks Recording District.

According to the United States Census Bureau, the CDP has a total area of 72.0 square miles (186 km^{2}), of which, 70.4 square miles (182 km^{2}) of it is land and 1.5 square miles (3.9 km^{2}) of it (2.14%) is water.

== Tetlin National Wildlife Refuge ==
Tetlin National Wildlife Refuge was established in 1980 to conserve and manage habitat critical to migratory and resident wildlife for benefit of present and future generations. The Refuge 730,000 acres (3,000 km^{2}) includes snowcapped mountains and glacier-fed rivers, forests and treeless tundra, and an abundance of wetlands. Tetlin Wildlife Refuge produces up to 1,000,000 ducklings a year, and it is home to 186 or more species of birds. This upper Tanana Valley has been called the "Tetlin Passage" because it serves as a major migratory route for birds traveling to and from Canada, the Lower 48 and both Central and South America. Many of these birds breed and nest in the refuge. Migrants, including ducks, geese, swans, cranes, raptors, and songbirds begin arriving in the valley in early April and continue into early June.

Tetlin also supports a variety of large mammals. Dall Sheep dot the higher slopes while moose feed upon the tender new growth that springs up in the wake of frequent lightning-caused fires. Wolves, grizzly, black bears and many members of three different caribou herds range over the refuge.

Two of the six known humpback whitefish spawning areas of the Yukon River drainage are located within the refuge. Along with caribou and moose, these fish are important subsistence resources for area residents. Arctic Grayling, Northern Pike and burbot are also found in the refuge's many streams and lakes.

== History ==
The semi-nomadic Athabascan Indians have historically lived in this area, moving with the seasons between several hunting and fishing camps. In 1885, Lt. H.T. Allen found small groups of people living in Tetlin and Last Tetlin, to the south. The residents of Last Tetlin had made numerous to trading posts on the Yukon River. In 1912, the villagers from Tetlin would trade at the Tanana Crossing Trading Post. During the Chisana gold stampede in 1913, a trading post was established across the river from Tetlin. When two trading posts were opened in the village during the 1920s by John Hajdukovich and W.H. Newton, residents from Last Tetlin relocated to Tetlin. A school was constructed in 1929, and a post office was opened in 1932. The 786,000-acre (3,180 km^{2}) Tetlin Indian Reserve was established in 1930. An airstrip was constructed in 1946. When the Alaska Native Claims Settlement Act(ANCSA) was passed in 1971, the reserve was revoked. Tetlin opted for surface and subsurface title to the 743,000 acres (3,010 km^{2}) of land in the former Reserve.

== Demographics ==
Historical population
| Census | Pop. | Note | %± |
|---|---|---|---|
| 1940 | 66 | | — |
| 1950 | 73 | | 10.6% |
| 1960 | 122 | | 67.1% |
| 1970 | 114 | | −6.6% |
| 1980 | 107 | | −6.1% |
| 1990 | 87 | | −18.7% |
| 2000 | 117 | | 34.5% |
| 2010 | 127 | | 8.5% |
| 2020 | 126 | | −0.8% |
U.S. Decennial Census

Tetlin first appeared on the 1940 U.S. Census as an unincorporated village. It was made a census-designated place (CDP) in 1980.

As of the census of 2000, there were 117 people, 42 households, and 25 families residing in the CDP. The population density was 1.7 inhabitants per square mile (0.66/km^{2}). There were 55 housing units at an average density of 0.8 per square mile (0.31/km^{2}). The racial makeup of the CDP was 2.56% White, 94.87% Native American, and 2.56% from two or more races.

Of the 42 households, 26.2% had children under the age of 18 living with them, 19.0% were married couples living together, 23.8% had a female householder with no husband present, and 38.1% were non-families. 28.6% of all households were made up of individuals, and 4.8% had someone living alone who was 65 years of age or older. The average household size was 2.79 and the average family size was 3.46.

In the CDP, the age distribution of the population shows 27.4% under the age of 18, 15.4% from 18 to 24, 29.1% from 25 to 44, 19.7% from 45 to 64, and 8.5% who were 65 years of age or older. The median age was 30 years. For every 100 females, there were 178.6 males. For every 100 females age 18 and over, there were 203.6 males.

The median income for a household in the CDP was $12,250, and the median income for a family was $18,750. Males had a median income of $0 versus $0 for females. The per capita income for the CDP was $7,372. There were 40.0% of families and 48.4% of the population living below the poverty line, including 61.3% of under eighteens and 28.6% of those over 64.

== Education ==
Tetlin is part of the Alaska Gateway School District. Tetlin School, a K–12 campus, serves community students.
