= Indigenous peoples of the Subarctic =

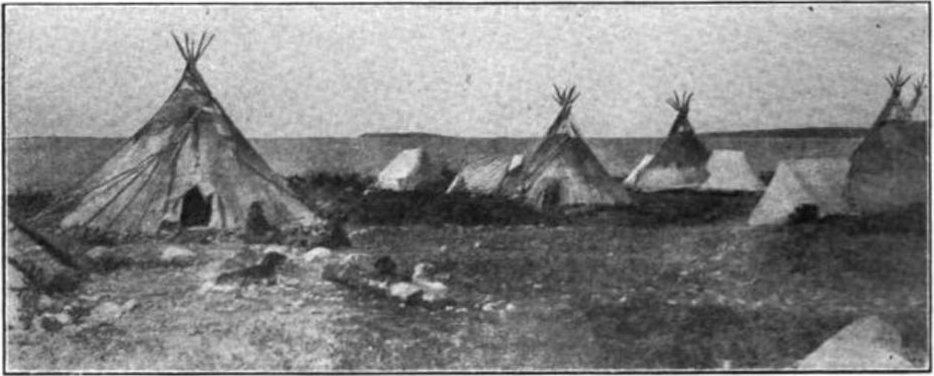
Tłı̨chǫ camp on the shore of Slave Lake at Fort Resolution, Northwest Territory, 1907

Indigenous peoples of the Subarctic are the aboriginal peoples the Subarctic regions of the Americas, located south of the true Arctic. This region includes the interior of Alaska, the Western Subarctic or western Canadian Shield and Mackenzie River drainage area, and the Eastern Subarctic or Eastern Canadian Shield.

== Languages ==
Native subarctic peoples have over 30 languages, falling into two major language families: Algonquian and Athapaskan. Algonquian peoples tend to live in the east, while Athapaskan peoples live more in the west.

== Arts and cultures ==
Caribou has traditionally played a central role in Subarctic culture. Besides providing food, caribou provides clothing, shelter, and tools, such as the babiche bag, made of caribou rawhide. Moosehair embroidery and porcupine quill embroidery are worked onto hides and birchbark. After introduction by Europeans, glass beads became popular and are sewn into floral designs. Additionally, some cultures practiced agriculture, alongside hunting-gathering.

== List of Indigenous peoples of the Subarctic ==
- Ahtna (Ahtena, Nabesna)
- Anishinaabe - see also Northeast Woodlands
  - Anisininew (Anishinini, Oji-Cree, Severn Ojibwa), Ontario, Manitoba
  - Ojibwa (Chippewa, Ojibwe), Ontario, Manitoba, Minnesota
  - Odawa (Ottawa)
- Atikamekw
- Chipewyan
- Cree
- Dakelh
  - Babine
  - Wet'suwet'en
- Deg Hit’an (Deg Xinag, Degexit’an, Kaiyuhkhotana)
- Dena’ina (Dialects: Outer Inlet, Upper Inlet, Iliama, Inland, Kachemak Bay, Kenai, Susitna River)
- Dane-zaa (Beaver)
- Gwich'in (Kutchin, Loucheaux)
- Hän
- Holikachuk
- Innu, Labrador and Quebec
  - Innu
  - Naskapi
- Kaska (Nahane)
- Kolchan (Upper Kuskokwim)
- Koyukon
- Naskapi
- Sahtu
- Sekani
- Slavey (Dialects: Hay River, Simpson Providence, Liard, Fort Nelson)
- Tagish
- Tahltan
- Tanana
  - Lower Tanana
  - Middle Tanana
  - Upper Tanana
  - Tanacross
- Tlicho
- Inland Tlingit
- Tsetsaut (extinct)
- Tsilhqot'in (Chilcotin)
- Northern Tutchone
- Southern Tutchone
- Yellowknives

== See also ==
- Alaska Native storytelling
- Alaska Natives
- Caribou
- Hudson's Bay Company
- Indigenous peoples in Canada
- Subarctic climate
