= Holikachuk (disambiguation) =

The Holikachuk are an Alaskan Native people. Holikachuk may also refer to:

- Holikachuk language, their language
- Holikachuk, Alaska, an abandoned village
