= Alaska Native languages =

Map showing the pre-colonisation distribution of indigenous languages on the peninsula. Eskimo–Aleut languages were spoken in the yellow maritime regions, while Na-Dene languages were spoken in the blue inland and southeast.

Alaska Natives are a group of indigenous people that live in the state of Alaska and trace their heritage back to the last two great migrations that occurred thousands of years ago. The Native community can be separated into six large tribes and a number of smaller tribes, including the Iñupiat, Yup'ik, Aleut, Tlingit, Haida, Tsimshian, and others. Even with just a small number of communities that make up the entire population, there were more than 300 different languages that the Natives used to communicate with one another.

However, by the time that Alaska joined the union in 1959, the number dwindled to only 20 spoken within the boundaries of the state. These can be divided into four separate families; the Eskimo–Aleut languages, Na-Dene, Haida, and Tsimshian. They all share similar characteristics, but have distinctive processes. Through the years after the colonization by the Russians, the importance of native languages subsided until the age of reformation occurred.

As stated by Michael E. Krauss, from the years 1960–1970, "Alaska Native Languages" went through "a transitional period of rebirth of interest in Alaska Native languages and a shift of developments in their favor". This resurrection has since taken off and there has been legislation that relates to the preservation and promotion of the native language.

== Effects of colonization ==
Sign in Siŋiaġruk, Selawik National Wildlife Refuge, in Iñupiaq

The Pledge of Allegiance in Central Alaskan Yupʼik, displayed in Gambell, Alaska

Prior to colonization by Russia, most Alaskan Native groups had their own unique languages, which were used for everyday communications. It was common for many individuals to be bilingual in order to facilitate business and rapports among different native groups. Upon contact with non-Native languages, the usage of native languages and the languages themselves have changed. As Russia was the first country to colonize Alaska, Russian words for goods or objects that were new to Native Alaskans were adopted into their native languages. For example, kofe (coffee) and chay (tea) are Russian words that have been added to the vocabularies of the Unangan (Aleut), Alutiiq (Sugpiaq), and Yup'ik. Intermarriages between Russians and Native Alaskans were frequent and gave rise to a new mixed population, increasing the number of Native Alaskans being able to speak both their native languages and Russian. Still, Native Alaskan languages remained the dominant languages spoken in Alaska.

It was only after American colonization when missionary, and later General Agent of Education of the Territory of Alaska, Sheldon Jackson, arrived in Alaska in 1877, did the use of native Alaska languages start to plummet. Jackson implemented an "English Only" policy within the school, legal, and political systems, and any violation of the rule was met with physical and mental punishments and abuse. This policy wasn't retracted until 2002. In 1924, the Alaska Voter's Literacy Act was passed, which demanded native Alaskan citizens to pass an English literacy test before earning the right to vote. This act further decreased the use of Native Alaska languages. Today, many of the Native Alaskan languages are either on the brink of extinction or already extinct.

== Language preservation ==
Alaska Native languages are being recorded and transcribed today in the hopes of having them revitalized through the use of these published dictionaries and grammar books. The languages are being recorded in their native tongue as speakers tell stories that are then written in both English and that language's alphabet. These alphabets are relatively new to the languages since they did not typically have a written version of the language before the influence of non-Native Alaskans.

About 20 native languages are being worked with by the Alaska Native Language Center (ANLC). In current time, the languages are being re-taught to the villagers through classes that are of help in the villages around Alaska and Canada. At the same time, people who are interested in Alaska Native languages can also learn through university campus classes at the University of Alaska Fairbanks. These languages are not limited solely to Alaska since their speakers were among northern North America before state and country borders were established. One of these Athabaskan languages is documented to be found in Southeast Alaska, along the interior and eastern border of Alaska, into Northern Canada, and then on into western Greenland.

In 2014, legislation passed in the state of Alaska to revise the official state language that formerly only included English. This law, effective as of 2015, recognizes Iñupiaq, Siberian Yupik, Central Alaskan Yup'ik, Alutiiq, Unangax, Dena'ina, Deg Xinag, Holikachuk, Koyukon, Upper Kuskokwim, Gwich'in, Tanana, Upper Tanana, Tanacross, Hän, Ahtna, Eyak, Tlingit, Haida, and Tsimshian as official state languages. However, this does not require the government to print documents or record other government actions in these languages. Additional legislation in relation to the preservation of Alaska's native languages is the House Concurrent Resolution 19 that recognizes the current status of native languages as a "linguistic emergency." While controversy over the use of "emergency" arose, the bill was eventually passed.

== Intersection of language and culture ==
Sign in Anchorage at a Black Lives Matter protest; in Iñupiaq, it means 'Black lives are important.'

Many Alaska Native languages are characterized within high context cultures. This means that the deliverance of messages is as much through nonverbal cues such as body language, silence, and eye contact. As a result, communication within Alaskan Native languages is not parallel to communication in the majority spoken English. This miscommunication lies in the use of context, as English within the Euro-American culture is considered to be low context, thus dependent on explicit deliverance of a message rather than contextually. A study on bilingual speakers in college settings notes the complications of Alaska Native speakers in predominantly English taught settings as a lack of understanding this cultural context. For instance, many Alaska Native languages determine silence to be a sign of respect and a demonstration that one is listening. However, in the Euro-American context, silence may be seen as a lack of understanding or lack of engagement.

Practice of Alaska Native languages often follows a didactic pattern, using stories and anecdotes to teach morals and lessons. For example, Tlingit culture follows this anecdotal pattern which emphasizes the role of the speaker and the listener. This is indicative of the importance of oral tradition in Tlingit culture, where information is passed down from elders to young learners.

== List of Alaska Native languages ==
- Inuit-Yupik-Unangan (Eskimo-Aleut)
  - Unangan (Aleut)
  - Alutiiq (Sugpiaq)
  - Central Alaskan Yup'ik (with Cup'ik and Cup'ig)
  - St. Lawrence Island Yupik
  - Iñupiaq
- Athabaskan-Eyak-Tlingit (Na-Dene)
  - Tlingit
  - Eyak
  - Athabaskan
    - Ahtna
    - Denaʼina
    - Deg Xinag
    - Holikachuk
    - Upper Kuskokwim
    - Koyukon
    - Lower Tanana
    - Tanacross
    - Upper Tanana
    - Gwich'in
    - Hän
- Haida
- Tsimshian

== Demographics ==
Language	Highly Proficient Speakers	Proficient Second-Language Speakers
Ahtna	~25	x
Aleut	40-80	x
Alutiiq/Sugpiaq	~80	x
Denaʼina	5	2-10
Deg Xinag	2	x
Eyak	0	1
Gwichʼin	200	x
Haida	5	2
Hän	2	x
Holikachuk	0	x
Iñupiaq	500-1,500	5-50
Koyukon	50-200	x
Tanana	1	x
Tanacross	5-10	x
Tlingit	~50	~20
Tsimshian	4	x
Upper Kuskokwim	40	x
Upper Tanana	10	25
Yup'ik	2,500-7,500	100-300
St. Lawrence Island Yupik	400-750	x

- Information in this table was retrieved from the Alaska Native Language Preservation & Advisory Council.
