= Belle Deacon =

American artist (1904–1995)

- Born: Belle Young; September 23, 1904; Anvik, Alaska, U.S.
- Died: November 7, 1995 (aged 91)
- Occupations: Elder, basketmaker, language, folklore expert
- Honours: National Heritage Fellowship (1992)

Belle Young Gochenauer Deacon (September 23, 1904 – November 7, 1995) was an American basketmaker and language and folklore expert. As an Alaska Native elder, she held and shared knowledge of the language and traditions of the Athabascan people. She received the National Heritage Fellowship in 1992.

== Early life ==
Young was born in an Athabascan community in Anvik, Alaska, the daughter of John Young and Ellen Young. Her grandmother Marcia was a basketmaker, and Deacon learned the art in childhood.

== Career ==
Deacon gathered, prepared and dyed a range of natural materials for weaving, and sold baskets and furs while she was a widow with young children. Her baskets were included in a Contemporary Native American Arts show that toured in Alaska in 1971. In 1984, she was an artist at the Smithsonian Folklife Festival in Washington, D.C. In 1992, she received the National Heritage Fellowship from the National Endowment for the Arts.

She told folktales in Deg Xinag to the Alaska Native Language Center at the University of Alaska Fairbanks, and nine of those tales was published, with translations and illustrations, as Engithidong Xugixudhoy: Their stories of long ago (1987). Her stories are valued not only for their narrative content, but as examples of Athabascan pedagogy and rhetoric.

== Personal life ==
Belle married twice. Her first husband was Henry Oliver Gochenauer, a white trader from Pennsylvania. They had three children together; he died before 1940. Her second husband was fur trapper John Deacon. They had at least four more children together in the 1940s, and lived in Grayling, Alaska. One of her daughters, Daisy Demientieff, became a noted basketmaker after her example. John Deacon died in 1984, and Belle Deacon died in 1995.
