= Deloy Ges =

Deg Xinag name for Anvik, Alaska, U.S.

Coordinates: 62.6555°N 160.2091°W

Deloy Ges is the Deg Xinag language name for the village of Anvik, Alaska, home to the Deg Hit'an people. More specifically, it refers to Anvik Hill, also called Hawk Bluff, the current site of the Anvik Airport.

Deloy Ges Inc. is also the name for the Deg Hit'an Native corporation. It translates literally as 'so-called mountain' or 'bum mountain'.

The traditional story, retold by elder Alta Jerue, says that one day, Yixgitsiy (also simply known as Raven) was walking along the Yukon River, when he saw a soil pile and decided to make a mountain. They say, every time he tried to climb it, the soil would slide down, bringing him along. After a short while, frustrated Yixgitsiy angrily hit at the pile with his walking stick, sending it all over. This is the reason, given in lore, for the many gulches on Anvik Hill, the so-called mountain.

The Deg Xinag word for 'raven' translates as 'your (plural) grandfather', as he is revered as the mythological village chief.
