= Doyon, Limited =

Alaska Native Regional Corporation

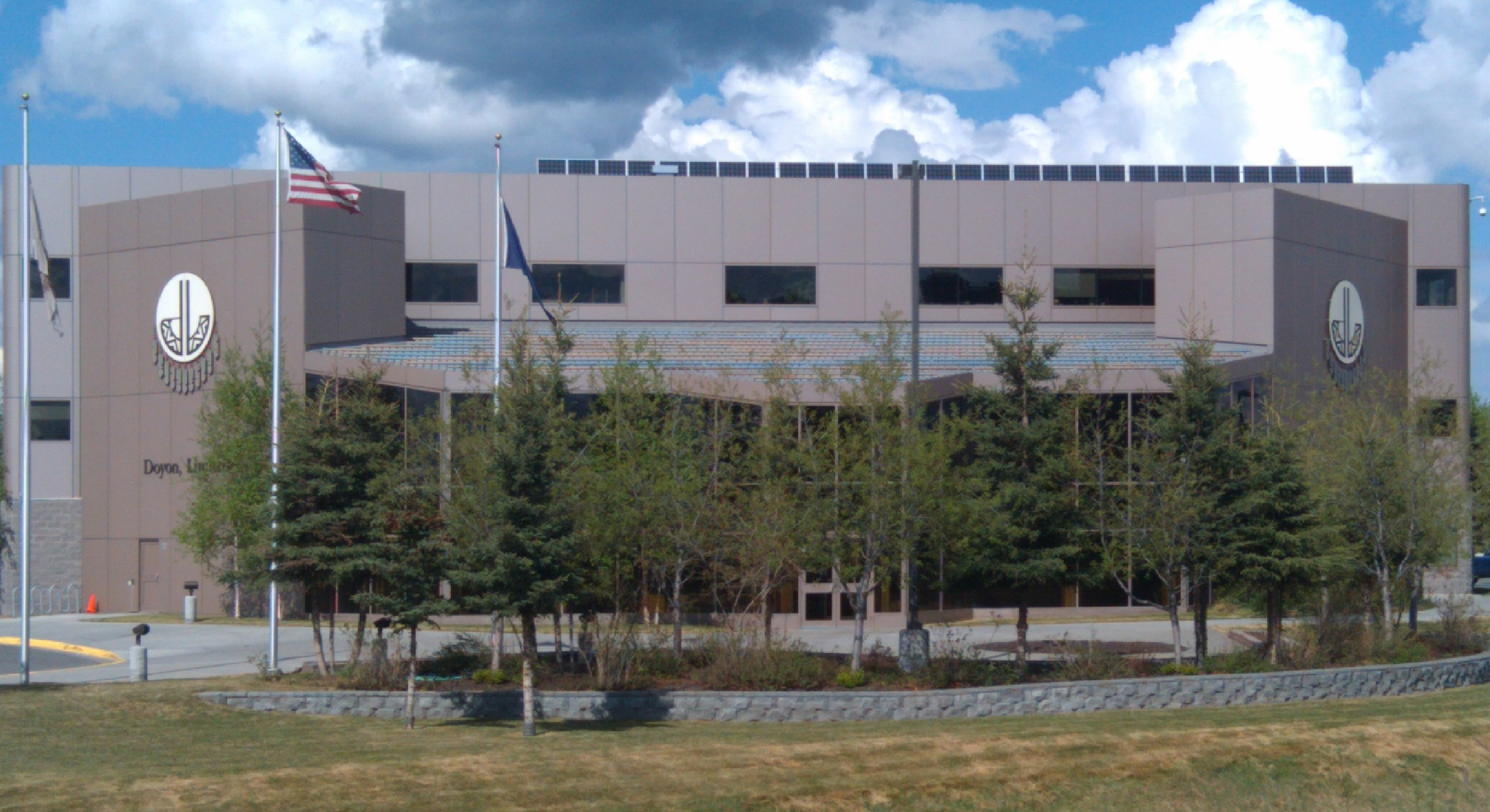

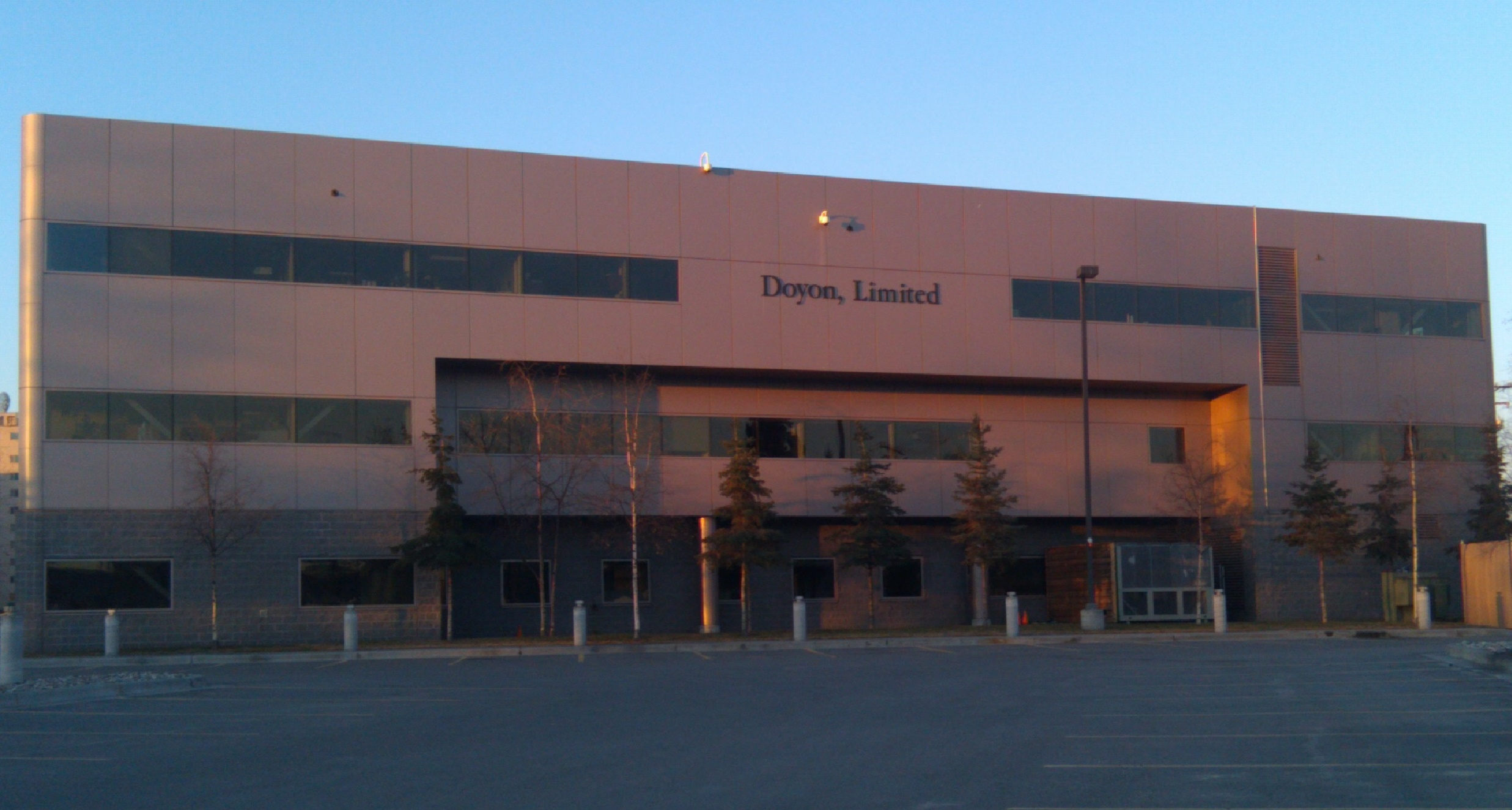
The front (top, facing southerly) and back (above, facing northerly) sides of Doyon's headquarters building in downtown Fairbanks

Doyon, Limited is one of thirteen Alaska Native Regional Corporations created under the Alaska Native Claims Settlement Act of 1971 (ANCSA) in settlement of aboriginal land claims. Doyon was incorporated in Alaska on June 26, 1972. Headquartered in Fairbanks, Alaska, Doyon is a for-profit corporation with about 20,000 Alaska Native shareholders primarily of Alaskan Athabaskan (excl. Denaʼina and Ahtna) descent.

== Etymology ==
The word doyon is a loanword from (Russian: тойо́н, romanized: toyón) in the Russian colonial period. It was derived from Yakut Turkic, toyon (тойон), meaning "boss, lord, master": Deg Xinag doyon̥, Holikachuk dayon̥, Upper Kuskokwim doyon̥, Koyukon doyon̥, Lower Tanana doyon̥, Dena'ina duyuq, duyəq; duyun, Ahtna dayaan; Sugpiaq (Alutiiq) tuyuq, Yup'ik tuyuq.

== Officers and directors ==
A current listing of Doyon's officers and directors, as well as documents filed with the State of Alaska since Doyon's incorporation, are available online through the Corporations Database of the Division of Corporations, Business & Professional Licensing, Alaska Department of Commerce, Community and Economic Development.

== Shareholders ==
At incorporation, Doyon enrolled 9,061 Alaska Native shareholders, each of whom received 100 shares of Doyon stock. A 1989 amendment to ANCSA granted regional corporations the right to enroll qualified Natives born after 1971, and in March 1992 Doyon shareholders voted to give stock to Native children born between 1971 and 1992, adding 5,487 additional shareholders to Doyon's rolls, bringing the total number of shareholders to over 14,000. Shareholders at that time also voted to give an additional 100 shares of stock to 646 elders who had reached age 65 by December 1992.

At the 2007 annual shareholder meeting in March 2007, Doyon shareholders voted to extend enrollment to eligible descendants of original Doyon shareholders who were born after 1992, and also to give additional shares of stock to elders who turned age 65 after 1992. This will result in a potential additional enrollment of about 5,925 children by 2011; an estimated 1,227 elders who will turn age 65 by 2011 will also receive additional shares of Doyon stock.

As an ANCSA corporation, Doyon has no publicly traded stock, and its shares cannot legally be sold.

== Lands ==
Doyon's land entitlement under ANCSA is about 12.5 million acres (19,500 sq mi; 50,600 km^{2}), making Doyon the largest private landholder in Alaska and among the largest private landowners in North America. The Doyon region encompasses a vast region in Interior Alaska, from Brooks Range in the north to the Alaska Range, and from Alaska's border with Canada in the east extending westward nearly to the shores of Norton Sound. As of March 2007, about 9.8 million acres (15,000 sq mi; 40,000 km^{2}) have been conveyed, including 6.6 million acres (10,000 sq mi; 27,000 km^{2}) in surface and subsurface estate (fee Owned) and 3.2 million acres (5,000 sq mi; 13,000 km^{2}) of subsurface estate corresponding to surface estate owned by villages corporations in the Doyon region.

== Business enterprises ==
Under federal law, Doyon and its majority-owned subsidiaries, joint ventures and partnerships are deemed to be "minority and economically disadvantaged business enterprise[s]" (43 USC 1626(e)).

Doyon operates the Kantishna Roadhouse: Denali Backcountry lodge through its subsidiary Doyon Tourism, Inc. This lodge has a main lodge and dispersed cabins in the Kantishna hills region and is private property located deep inside the boundaries of Denali National Park and Preserve. It operates buses that can venture into the park into the restricted zone from mile 15 to 93, "flightseeing" tours that fly above Denali, guided hikes, dog mushing demonstrations, fly fishing, and sightseeing and other activities. It is one of a few lodges deep in the park that are private property and not concessionaires with the National Park Service. This region was an old gold mining region before the establishment of the park and has since been an area with various grandfathered private property within the park's boundary.

Doyon also operates a joint venture with Aramark Corporation to run the park concessions for Denali National Park and Preserve and this concession manages tour and transit buses into the park, interpretive services for Savage river cabin and Primrose rest area, the Morino grill, Riley Creek Mercantile and campground, Savage River campground, Igloo Creek campground, Sanctuary Campground, Teklanika Campground, and the Denali Bus Depot. It manages reservations for Wonder Lake campground. Along with Holland America Line, Princess Cruises, and the local coal mine, this joint venture has a significant impact on the local economy in and outside of Denali. The reservation system for this joint venture is separate from the Kantishna Roadhouse. This joint venture operates two buses that go to the Kantishna hills, the Kantishna Experience and the Kantishna transit, but these should not be confused with the Kantishna roadhouse shuttle. The buses in this operation do not go to this resort or have the same reservation system.

Doyon also operates an oil and natural gas drilling subsidiary called Doyon Drilling, which according to its website operates eight drilling rigs in the state of Alaska. In 1982 Doyon formed a joint venture with another drilling corporation called Nugget Alaska, LLC. This subsidiary is said to have around 300 employees. Doyon Drilling's headquarters is not in Fairbanks like the rest of Doyon, but in Anchorage.

== See also ==
- Alaska Native Claims Settlement Act
- Alaska Native Regional Corporations
- Morris Thompson
