= Iditarod River =

- Location of the mouth of the Iditarod River in Alaska

Location
- Country: United States
- State: Alaska
- Census Area: Bethel, Yukon–Koyukuk

Physical characteristics
- Source: north of the Russian Mountains
  - location: north of Chuathbaluk on the Kuskokwim River, Bethel Census Area
  - coordinates: 61°46′54″N 158°55′44″W
  - elevation: 1,103 ft (336 m)
- Mouth: Innoko River
  - location: 25 miles (40 km) northeast of Holikachuk, Yukon–Koyukuk Census Area
  - coordinates: 63°01′46″N 158°45′57″W
  - elevation: 56 ft (17 m)
- Length: 325 mi (523 km)

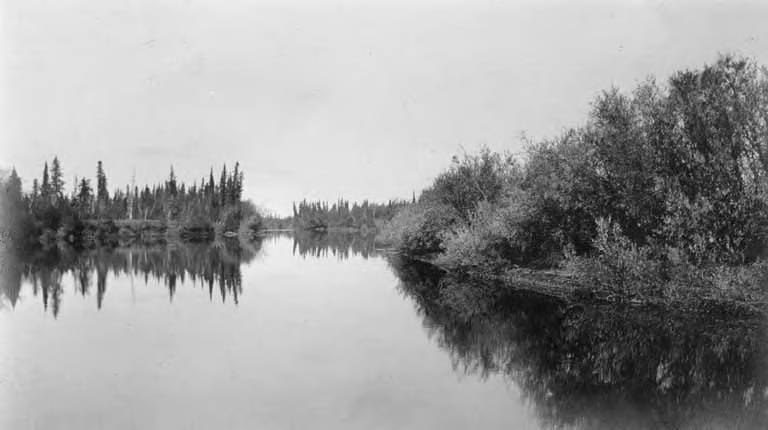

The Iditarod River is a 325-mile (523 km) tributary of the Innoko River in the U.S. state of Alaska. The river begins north of Chuathbaluk and the Russian Mountains and flows northeast and then west to meet the larger river near Holikachuk.

Iditarod is an Anglicization of the Deg Hit’an (Athabascan) name for the river, Haiditirod or Haidilatna, which is probably an English version of the name of a village on the river, that may have corresponded with the village called Iditarod in the 1900s.

== See also ==
- List of rivers of Alaska
