= Alaskan ice cream =

Alaska Native dessert

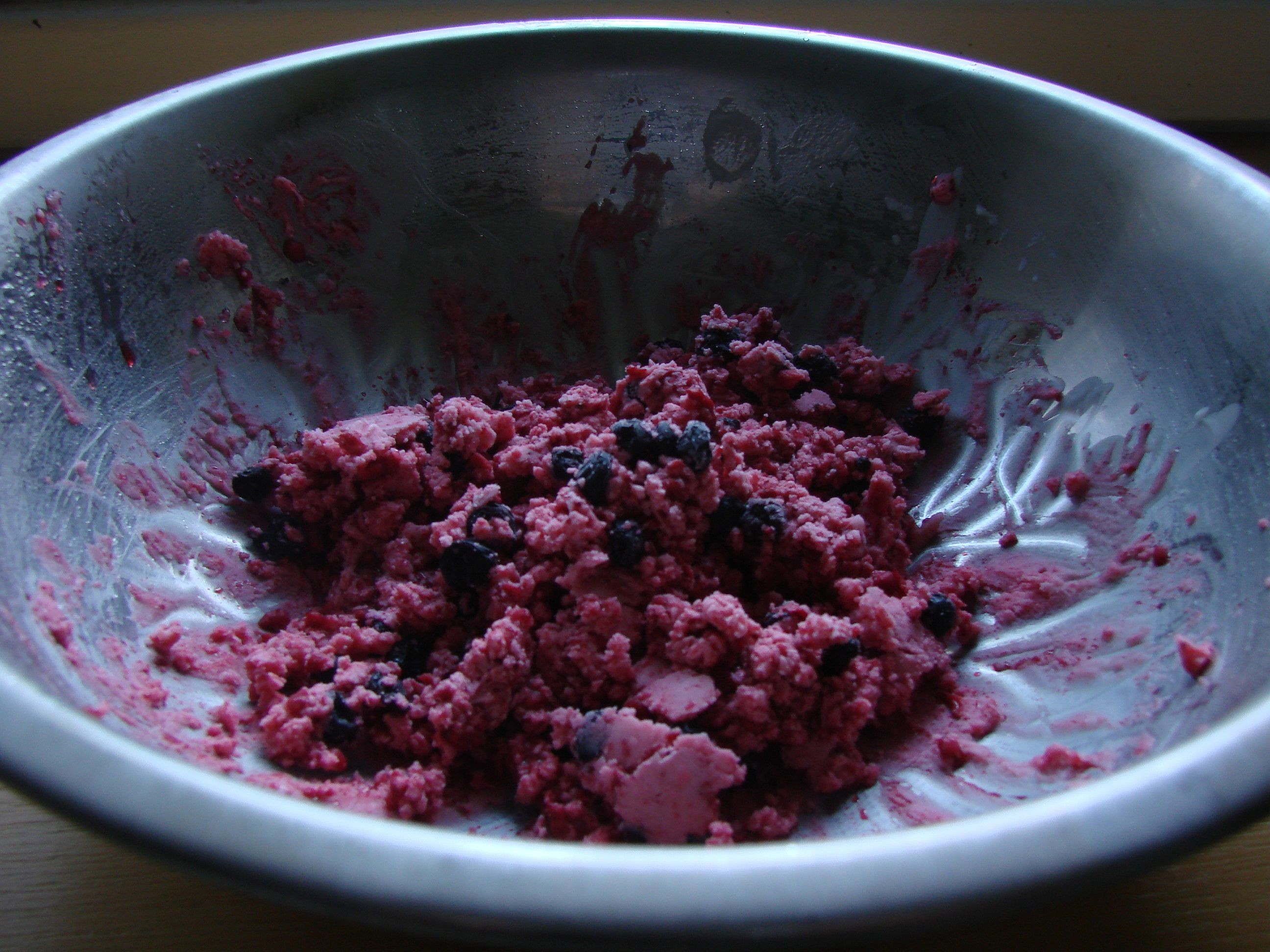
- Iced akutaq made from raspberries and blueberries and vegetable shortening
- Alternative names: Alaska Native ice cream, Alaskan Indian ice cream, Native ice cream, Indian ice cream, Akutaq/Akutuq, Eskimo ice cream
- Type: Dessert
- Place of origin: United States
- Region or state: Alaska
- Created by: Alaskan Athabaskans, Iñupiat, Yup'ik
- Main ingredients: dried fish or meat, fat, berries

Alaskan ice cream (also known as Alaska Native ice cream, Alaskan Indian ice cream, Native ice cream, or Indian ice cream, and Inuit-Yupik varieties of which are known as Inuit ice cream, akutaq/akutuq, or Eskimo ice cream) is a dessert made by the Alaska Native groups of Alaskan Athabaskans, Iñupiat, and Yup'ik.

It is traditionally made of whipped fat or tallow (e.g. caribou, moose, or walrus tallow, or seal oil) and meat (such as dried fish, especially pike, sheefish or inconnu, whitefish or cisco, or freshwater whitefishes, or dried moose or caribou) mixed with berries (especially cowberry, bilberry, Vaccinium oxycoccos or other cranberries, bearberry, crowberry, salmonberry, cloudberry or low-bush salmonberry, raspberry, blueberry, or prickly rose) or mild sweeteners such as roots of Indian potato or wild carrot, mixed and whipped with a whisk. It may also include tundra greens. There is also a kind of akutaq which is called snow akutaq. The most common recipes for Indian ice cream consist of dried and pulverized moose or caribou tenderloin that is blended with moose fat (traditionally in a birch bark container) until the mixture is light and fluffy. It may be eaten unfrozen or frozen, and in the latter case it somewhat resembles commercial ice cream.

"Ice cream songs" used to be sung during the preparation of Alaskan Athabascan Indian ice cream.

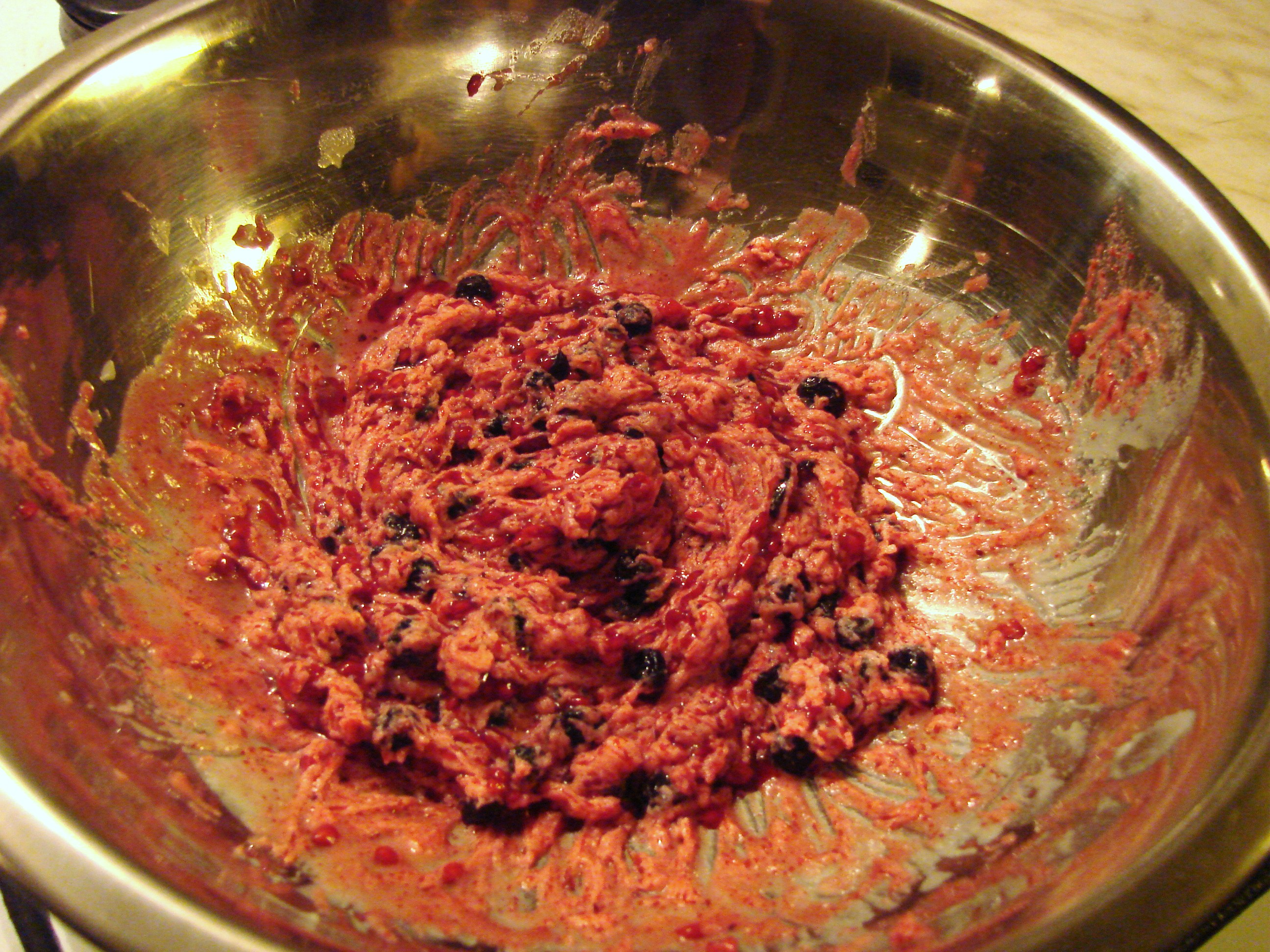
Akutaq made from raspberries, blueberries and vegetable shortening

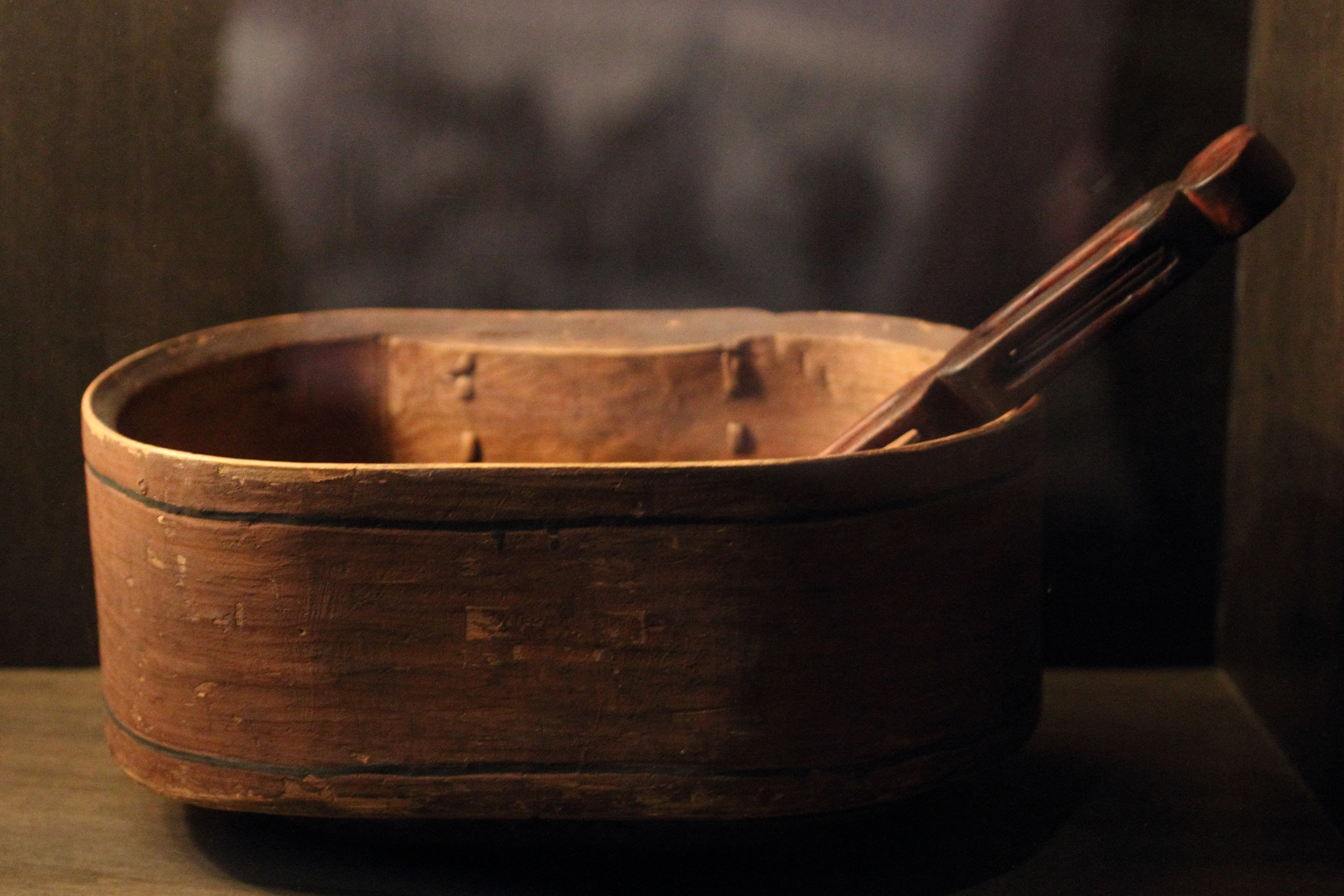
Tumnaq, a wooden bowl used to make akutaq

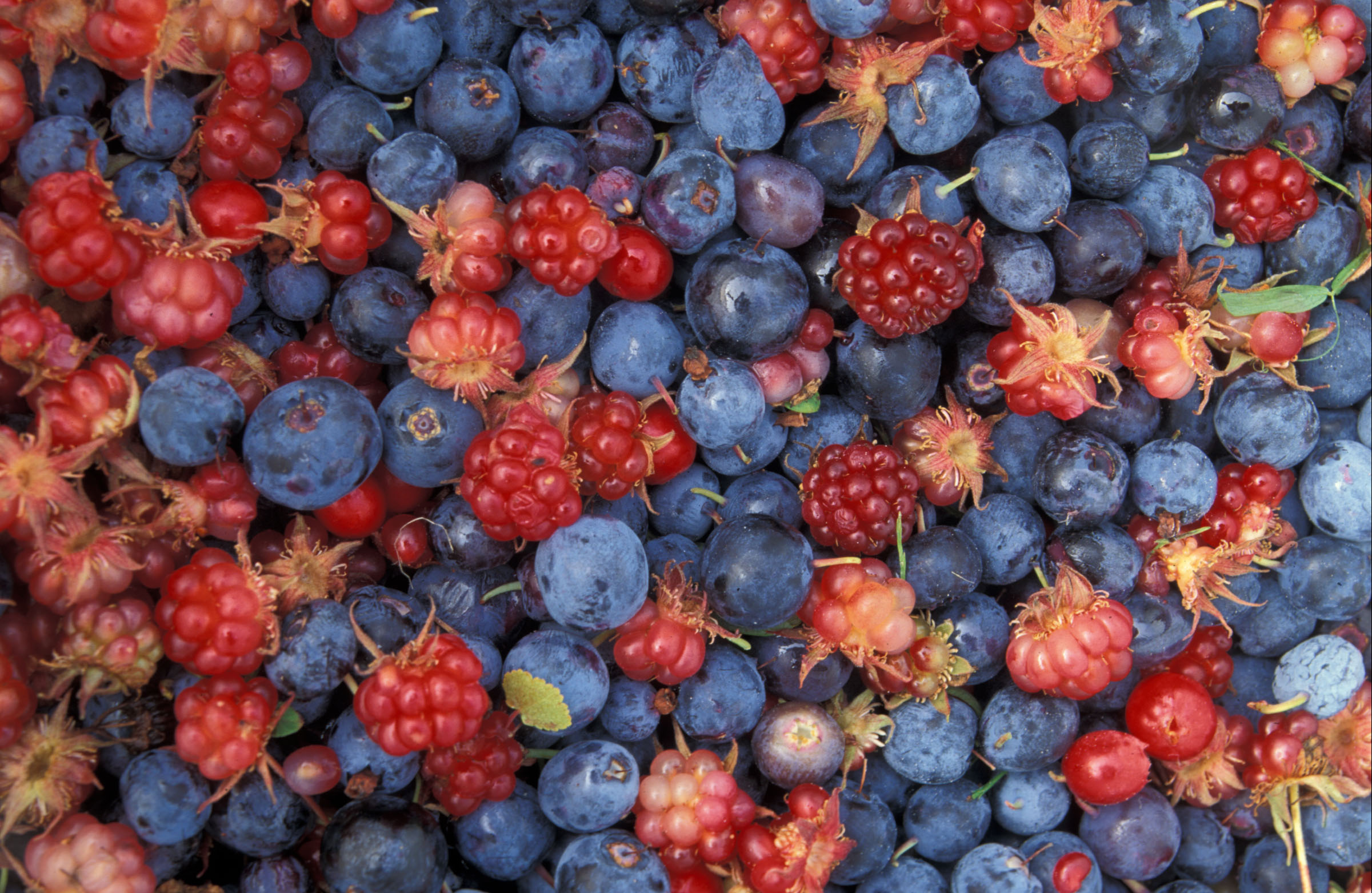
Wild berries from the Innoko National Wildlife Refuge: Vaccinium uliginosum (blue), V. vitis-idaea, and Rubus arcticus

== Native names ==
Athabaskan language	ice cream
Ahtna	?
Dena’ina	nivagi
Deg Xinag	vanhgiq
Holikachuk	nathdlod
Koyukon	nonaałdlode (lit. 'creamed one' or 'that which has been whipped up')
Upper Kuskokwim	nemaje
Lower Tanana	nonathdlodi
Tanacross	nanehdlaad
Upper Tanana	?
Gwich’in	it’suh
Hän	?
Inuit-Yupik language	ice cream
Inuktitut	akutuq (ᐊᑯᑐᖅ)
Iñupiaq (Northern)	akutuq (lit. 'mixed/stirred together')
Inupiaq (Bering Straits)	agutaq (lit. 'mixed/stirred together')
Yup'ik	akutaq (lit. 'mixed/stirred together')
Alutiiq (Northern)	akutaq, sisuq
Alutiiq (Southern)	akutaq, pirinaq

== See also ==
- List of desserts
- Pemmican
- Suorat
- Tolkusha
- Mincemeat
- Tavukgöğsü - another dessert made of chicken breast meat
