= Mary TallMountain =

American poet

- Born: Mary Demonski; June 19, 1918; Nulato, Alaska, U.S.
- Died: September 2, 1994 (aged 76); Petaluma, California, U.S.
- Occupations: Poet; Storyteller
- Known for: Tenderloin Women Writer's Workshop

Mary TallMountain (June 19, 1918 – September 2, 1994) was a poet and storyteller of mixed Scotch-Irish and Koyukon ancestry. Her works deal with the interplay of Christianity with indigenous beliefs and the difficulties of her own life. Before her mother died from tuberculosis she was adopted by a white couple where she faced prejudice among whites. Her experience with alcoholism and as a victim of prejudice and child abuse is expressed in the theme of struggle and healing in her work. She started her working career as a legal secretary and began writing around age 50 when she was a contributor to the Native American Renaissance. She eventually owned her own stenography business, which she lost while battling cancer. Her final years were spent in a poor, inner-city neighborhood in San Francisco, where she co-founded the Tenderloin Women Writers Workshop. She lived in San Francisco until her death in 1994.

== Early life ==
Mary TallMountain was born on June 19, 1918, in Nulato, Alaska, to a mother of Russian and Native American heritage, and a father of Irish-Scottish descent, who was an American soldier. She was born to the Athabascan tribe, which is believed to be one of the original tribes that came over to Alaska via land bridge from Asia. Mary also had a brother two years younger than her. Tallmountain's mother had Tuberculosis when she had both her children, and decided to give them both up for adoption, knowing she would inevitably die from TB; so that her children would hopefully have a future free from TB. Because of a decision by the village council, Tallmountain's younger brother stayed, and she was given to the government doctors white family, the Randles. She and her adoptive family moved to Oregon. This transition was very traumatic for Tallmountain as she was taken from her native land, people, language, and culture. Her adoptive father was abusive, and molested her. She was not allowed to speak her native tongue, and was bullied by the white school children she attended school with. When the Great Depression hit in the 1930s, she and her adoptive family became poor immigrant workers and moved to Portland, Oregon. And shortly after Tallmountain graduated high school, he died of heart failure. When Tallmountan was 19 she married Dal Roberts, who died after only three years of marriage. Later, her adoptive mother, in 1945, suffering from Parkinson's and Diabetes, committed suicide. Tallmountain then left Portland, Oregon, and went to Reno, Nevada, to pursue a career of a legal secretary.

== Career ==
After TallMountain moved to Reno, Nevada, and trained and worked as a legal secretary she began to drink to deal with her struggles in the past. After taking into account the damage all the alcohol was doing to her body she quit drinking and started her own stenography business. She was then diagnosed with cancer in 1968, while she overcame this, she lost her business. After losing her business she moved to the "Tenderloin", then a lower income neighborhood of San Francisco. She began to keep a journal, as her adoptive mother had her do when she was a child. After she started receiving a disability pension she was able to teach, write, do readings, and follow her true passion: writing. She published works such as "Nine Poems," and "Good Grease." Much of her work follows the themes of spirituality of Native and Christian though, and our connectedness to nature. TallMountain writes "Coyotes' Desert Lament," where the narrator becomes a coyote, exploring Native thought how all creatures and people are connected.

"Suddenly I am coyote too, Nose a wet black tremble. Hound and I bunch together Among warm grey bodies Calling our brother home."

She was diagnosed with cancer a second time in 1978, then when she went into remission she located her biological father. He was also battling cancer, living in Phoenix, Arizona, and spent the last few years of his life with her.

== Late life ==
TallMountain was located by an Alaskan poet and given a grant to travel and teach to local schools, communities, and prisons. Then in 1987 she co-founded the Tenderloin Women Writers Workshop, to support local women in expressing themselves through literature. She suffered a stroke in 1992, which left her with aphasia, the inability to express or understand language. She then stopped doing any readings or teaching, but continued to write until her death on September 2, 1994. Her work titled "Listen To The Night" was published in 1995 by Freedom Voices. After her death a memorial organization dedicated to preserving her literary works and advancing the causes she championed was created by the Tenderloin Reflection and Education Center (TREC) a non-profit organization with which she had a long association.

== Works ==
The Rasmussen Library at the University of Alaska in Fairbanks houses an archival collection of TallMountain's published and unpublished works.

Listen to the Night, Poems to the Animal Spirits of Mother Earth, SF Freedom Voices, 1995, Edited by Ben Clarke, Introduction by Kitty Costello, Illustrations by Inuk artist Kenojuak: collection of over 40 poems with animal themes.

A Quick Brush of Wings, SF, Freedom Voices/ Red Star, Black Rose, 1991: A collection of 23 poems and 3 chapters from unpublished novel in progress Doyon.

The Light on the Tent Wall, A Bridging, Los Angeles: UCLA Press, 1990: A collection of 52 poems.

Matrilineal Cycle, Oakland, CA, Red Star Black Rose Printing, 1990 (Reprinted from Open Heart Press publication, 1988): Poems: "The Figure in Clay", "Women in Old Parkas", "Grandmother's Dream", "Matmiya", "Where Banshee Wind Is", "The Light on the Tent Wall", "A Song for My Mother", "The Hands of Mary Joe", "Brother Wolverine", "My Wild Birds Flying".THE LAST WOLF

There Is No Word for Goodbye, Oakland, Red Star Black Rose Printing, 1990 (Reprinted from Open Heart Press publication, 1988): A collection of 19 poems.

Continuum, Marvin, SD: Blue Cloud Quarterly, 1988. Poems: "Chant to the Spirit", "Continuum", "Are", "Ashes Unto Eden", "Silence and Small Music", " Folks on the Line", "Is There Light Still Springing?", "In the Night Also", "Francesco: Il Poverello Il Troubadore", "Celebration at the Cross", "One Splendid Note", "Manna at Nazareth".

Green March Moons, Berkeley: New Seed Press, 1987 Story: "Green March Moons".

Nine Poems, San Francisco: Friars Press, 1977. A pamphlet including the poems "Birthing", "Smell of Rain", "I Send You Dulcimers", "Tissue Roses", "Out Where the Pavement Ends", "Girl Thinking of Striped Bass", "Somewhere Little Hawks", "Collage of Hours", "Or Green Tree Lizards".
