= Holikachuk =

Yupikized Alaska Native Athabaskan people

Holikachuk Doogh Hit’an
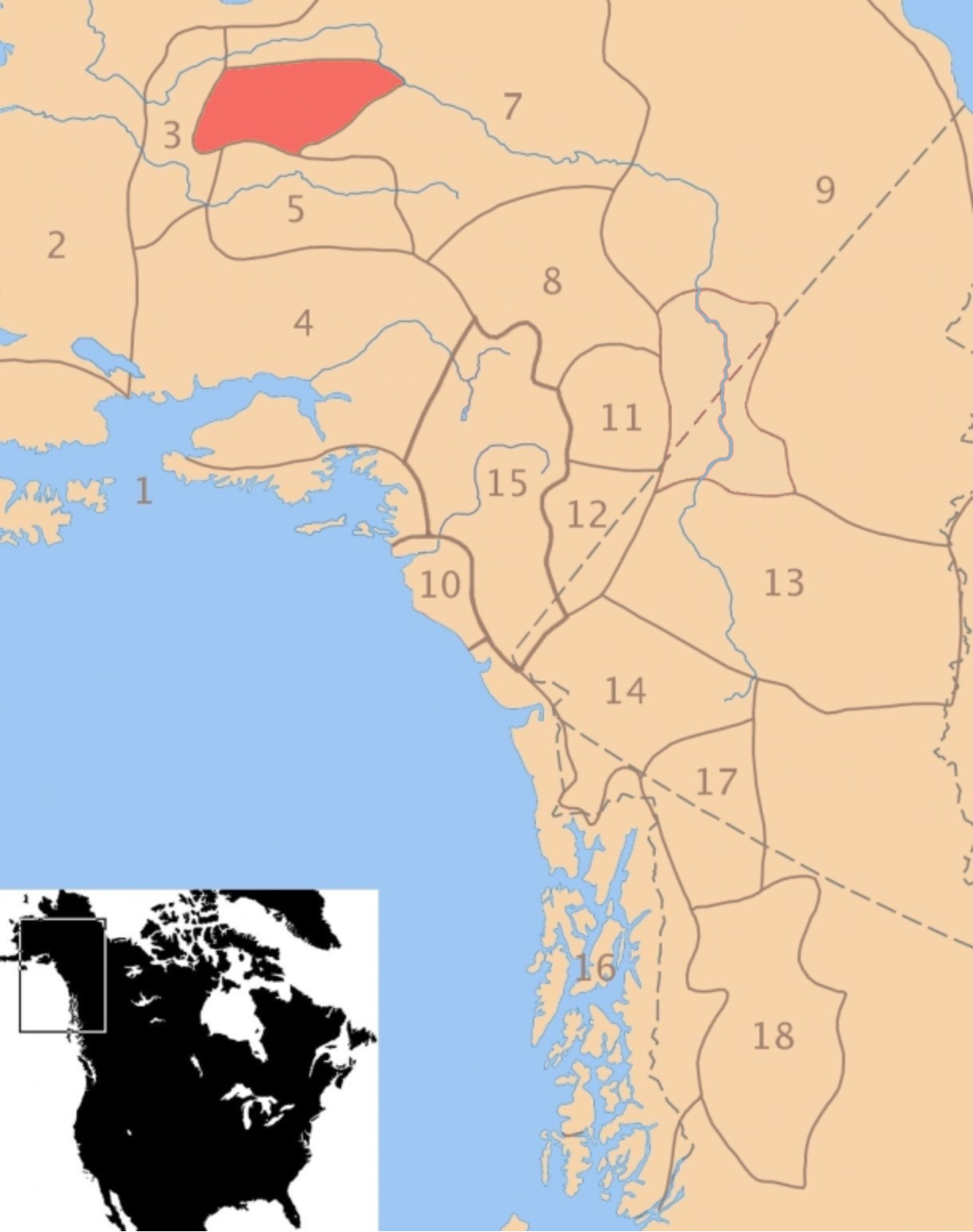
- Holikachuk-speaking area

Total population
- 180

Regions with significant populations
- United States (Alaska)

Languages
- Holikachuk, American Indian English (Alaskan variant)

Religion
- Shamanism ~ Animism (largely ex), Christianity

Related ethnic groups
- Other Alaskan Athabaskans; Especially Deg Xitʼan and Koyukon

Holikachuk (Holikachuk: Doogh Hit’an; also Innoko, Organized Village of Grayling, Innoka-khotana, Tlëgon-khotana) are a Yupikized Alaska Native Athabaskan people of the Athabaskan-speaking ethnolinguistic group to western Alaska. Their native territory includes the area surrounding the middle and upper Innoko River. Later in 1963 they moved to Grayling on the Yukon River.

The Holikachuk call themselves Doogh Hit’an (IPA: [toʁhətʼan]). The name Holikachuk is derived from the name (in the Holikachuk language) of a village in native Holikachuk territory.

The Holikachuk have been neglected by anthropologists, resulting in little documentation (both published and unpublished). In the past they have erroneously (or out of convenience) been grouped with the Koyukon.

The peoples neighboring the Holikachuk are in the north the Yup'ik and Koyukon, in the east the Koyukon, in the south the Upper Kuskokwim people, and in the west the Deg Hit'an.

Holikachuk culture is a relative to the Deg Hit'an culture.
