= Iditarod (disambiguation) =

Iditarod (/aɪˈdɪtərɒd/) may refer to:

- Iditarod, Alaska, an abandoned town in the Yukon–Koyukuk Census Area of Alaska
- Iditarod River, a river in western Alaska
- Iditarod Trail, a thousand-plus mile historic and contemporary trail system in Alaska
- Iditarod Trail Sled Dog Race, an annual sled dog team race across Alaska
