= Siobhan Wescott =

American Alaskan Athabaskan educator

- Born: Fairbanks, Alaska, US
- Citizenship: Alaskan Athabaskan and United States
- Education: Dartmouth College; University of California; Harvard College
- Scientific career
- Workplaces: University of North Dakota; Nebraska Medical Center

Siobhan Wescott is an American educator who is Professor of American Indian Health at the Nebraska Medical Center College of Public Health. She was previously Director of the Indians into Medicine program at the University of North Dakota, where she trained hundreds of Native American physicians. In 2022, she was included by Stat News on their definitive list of leaders in the life sciences.

== Early life and education ==
Wescott is Alaskan Athabaskan. She grew up in a 400 square foot cabin near Fairbanks, Alaska. She was inspired to become a physician after attending a public health conference in Anchorage, Alaska. She believed that the representation of Native Americans would strengthen medical research and practice. Wescott studied government at Dartmouth College. After completing her undergraduate degree, she started working for Tom Daschle, senator for South Dakota. She was appointed a Henry M. Jackson Leadership Fellow in the Senate Committee on Indian Affairs. Disenchanted by her time in Washington, D.C., Wescott returned to Alaska. She eventually moved to California, where she earned a master's degree in public health from the University of California. At the age of thirty five, Wescott earned her medical degree from the Harvard Medical School. She joined the faculty there and established the Four Directions Summer Research Program. The program looked to support Native American undergraduates find medical careers.

== Research and career ==
In 2019, Wescott joined the University of North Dakota at Director of the Indians into Medicine program. She became concerned above the shortage of Native American physicians. At the time it was estimated that medical faculty members who identify as Native American or Alaska Natives made up 0.1% of those nationwide. She trained Native American physicians. She worked with the American Medical Association and the Association of American Indian Physicians to organize an annual summit that looks to diversify those who consider careers in medicine.

Wescott was the first person appointed Director of American Indian Health at the Nebraska Medical Center College of Public Health in 2021, where she holds the Dr. Susan and Susette (Inshata Theumba) LaFlesche Professorship. The professorship is named after two La Flesche sisters from the Omaha Tribe who were public health advocates. In this role she looks to end health inequities and improve the trust of Native American in physicians. One of her first activities was to encourage Native Americans to create a memorial quilt to honor those in their communities who had lost their lives to COVID-19.

In 2022, Stat News included Wescott as one of the leaders in the life sciences on their definitive list.

== Selected publications ==
- Anna M Morenz; Siobhan Wescott; Arash Mostaghimi; Thomas D Sequist; Matthew Tobey (19 June 2019). "Evaluation of Barriers to Telehealth Programs and Dermatological Care for American Indian Individuals in Rural Communities". JAMA Dermatology. doi:10.1001/jamadermatol.2019.0872. ISSN 2168-6068. PMID 31215975. Wikidata Q92874767.
- Donald Warne; Siobhan Wescott (23 May 2019). "Social Determinants of American Indian Nutritional Health". Current Developments in Nutrition. 3 (Suppl 2): 12–18. doi:10.1093/cdn/nzz054. ISSN 2475-2991. PMC 6700461. PMID 31453425. Wikidata Q92894614.
- Kleinfeld, Judith; Wescott, Siobhan (2001). Fantastic Antone succeeds! : experiences in educating children with fetal alcohol syndrome. University of Alaska Press. ISBN 978-0-912006-65-9. OCLC 540329334.
