= Anvik, Alaska =

Anvik Gitr'ingith Chagg (Degexit'an)
- City
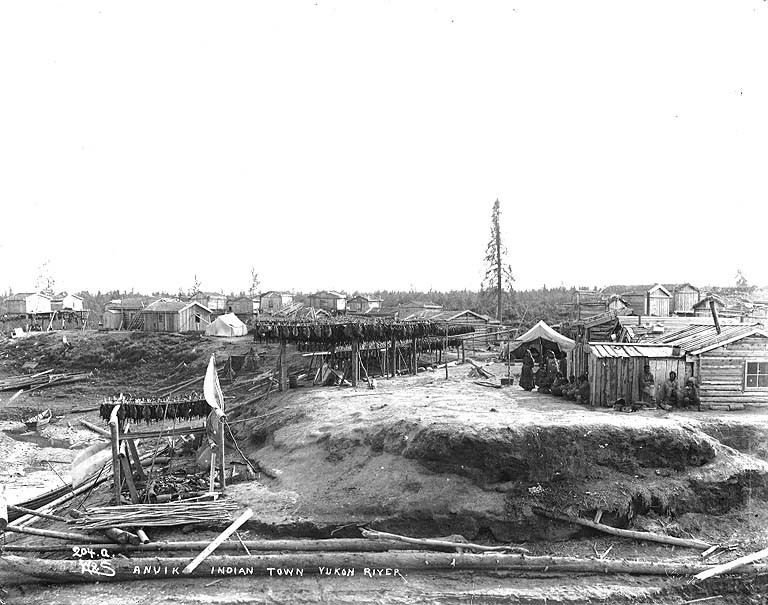
- Fish drying on racks in Anvik in 1901

- Location in Alaska
- Coordinates: 62°39′22″N 160°12′24″W
- Country: United States
- State: Alaska
- Census Area: Yukon-Koyukuk
- Incorporated: October 6, 1969

Government
  - Mayor: Jason Jones
  - State senator: Click Bishop (R)
  - State rep.: Mike Cronk (R)

Area
  - Total: 11.93 sq mi (30.89 km^{2})
  - Land: 9.49 sq mi (24.58 km^{2})
  - Water: 2.44 sq mi (6.31 km^{2})
- Elevation: 52 ft (16 m)

Population (2020)
  - Total: 70
  - Density: 7.4/sq mi (2.85/km^{2})
- Time zone: UTC-9 (Alaska (AKST))
  - Summer (DST): UTC-8 (AKDT)
- ZIP code: 99558
- Area code: 907
- FIPS code: 02-03880

Anvik (Deg Xinag: Gitr'ingith Chagg) is a city, home to the Deg Hit'an people, in the Yukon-Koyukuk Census Area, Alaska, United States. The name Anvik, meaning "exit" in the Central Alaskan Yup'ik language, became the common usage despite multiple names at the time, and may have come from early Russian explorers. The native name in the Deg Xinag language is Deloy Ges. As of the 2020 census, Anvik had a population of 70.

== Geography ==
Anvik is located west of the Yukon River at the mouth of the Anvik River. It is 34 miles (55 km) to the north of Holy Cross. There is a public Anvik Airport (ANV) with a 2,960-foot (900 m) gravel runway located one mile (1.6 km) southeast of downtown Anvik.

The Anvik Connector is a trail, designated a national side trail, which links the community to the Iditarod Trail 86 miles (138 km) to the east.

According to the United States Census Bureau, the city has a total area of 11.9 square miles (31 km^{2}), of which 9.5 square miles (25 km^{2}) is land and 2.4 square miles (6.2 km^{2}) (20.44%) is water. It is an incorporated place (FIPS 55-3 Class C6).

== Demographics ==
Historical population
Census	Pop.	Note	%±
1880	95		—
1890	191		101.1%
1900	166		−13.1%
1910	151		−9.0%
1920	140		−7.3%
1930	79		−43.6%
1940	110		39.2%
1950	99		−10.0%
1960	120		21.2%
1970	83		−30.8%
1980	114		37.3%
1990	82		−28.1%
2000	104		26.8%
2010	85		−18.3%
2020	70		−17.6%
U.S. Decennial Census

Anvik first appeared on the 1880 U.S. Census as Anvik Station and Village with 95 residents: 94 were members of the Tinneh tribe and 1 was White. It has returned as Anvik since 1890 (however, for the purpose of consolidation, Anvik's total population that year included both the Anvik Mission and Station, as well as the native (Tinneh) village and Kaltag). It incorporated in 1969.

=== 2020 census ===
As of the 2020 census, Anvik had a population of 70. The median age was 38.3 years. 28.6% of residents were under the age of 18 and 17.1% of residents were 65 years of age or older. For every 100 females there were 141.4 males, and for every 100 females age 18 and over there were 138.1 males age 18 and over.

0.0% of residents lived in urban areas, while 100.0% lived in rural areas.

There were 21 households in Anvik, of which 33.3% had children under the age of 18 living in them. Of all households, 23.8% were married-couple households, 47.6% were households with a male householder and no spouse or partner present, and 4.8% were households with a female householder and no spouse or partner present. About 33.3% of all households were made up of individuals and 23.8% had someone living alone who was 65 years of age or older.

There were 42 housing units, of which 50.0% were vacant. The homeowner vacancy rate was 4.8% and the rental vacancy rate was 66.7%.

Racial composition as of the 2020 census
Race	Number	Percent
White	3	4.3%
Black or African American	0	0.0%
American Indian and Alaska Native	62	88.6%
Asian	0	0.0%
Native Hawaiian and Other Pacific Islander	0	0.0%
Some other race	0	0.0%
Two or more races	5	7.1%
Hispanic or Latino (of any race)	0	0.0%

=== 2000 census ===
At the 2000 census, there were 104 people, 39 households and 23 families residing in the city. The population density was 10.9 inhabitants per square mile (4.2/km^{2}). There were 49 housing units at an average density of 5.2 units per square mile (2.0 units/km^{2}). The racial makeup of the city was 94 Native American, nine White, and one from other races. One also reported Hispanic or Latino ethnicity.

Of the 39 households, 41.0% had children under the age of 18 living with them, 30.8% were married couples living together, 25.6% had a female householder with no husband present, and 41.0% were non-families. 33.3% of all households were made up of individuals, and 7.7% had someone living alone who was 65 years of age or older. The average household size was 2.67 and the average family size was 3.43.

Age distribution was 34 under the age of 15, 6 from 16 to 18, 9 from 18 to 24, 28 from 25 to 44, 19 from 45 to 64, and 8 who were 65 years of age or older. The average age was 30.14 and the median age was 28.5 years, compared to 32.4 for the entire state. There were 57 males (35 over 18) and 47 females (29 over 18).

The annual median household income was $21,250, and the median family income was $18,125. Males had a median income of $0 versus $18,750 for females. The per capita income for the city was $8,081 (compare $21,587 nationally). Median rent was $263 and monthly housing and mortgage costs were $833. There were 40.0% of families and 44.2% of the population living below the poverty line, including 45.5% of under eighteens and 50.0% of those over 64.

== Education ==
The Iditarod Area School District operates the Blackwell School in Anvik.

== Notable people ==
- Deenaalee Chase-Hodgdon, commercial fisher, collective founder, and storyteller
