= Babiche =

Rawhide cord made by Native Americans

Babiche is a type of cord or lacing of rawhide or sinew traditionally made by Native Americans.

Babiche were used for all purposes for which Europeans would use string or rope, e.g. as webbing, in the manufacture of snowshoes, braided straps and tumplines, fishing and harpoon lines.

Babiche bags were flexible carrying bags made from netted rawhide thongs, used by the Indigenous peoples of the Subarctic into the 20th century, especially for carrying meat.

== Etymology ==
Babiche is the Canadian French adaptation of an Algonquian word derived from the Míkmaq ápapíj, itself derived from ápapi, meaning "cord" or "thread".
