= Holikachuk, Alaska =

Coordinates: 62°55′56″N 159°32′41″W

Holikachuk or Huligachagat (Xiyighelinghdi in Holikachuk language, Xiyeghelinghdi in Deg Xinag) is an abandoned village on the Innoko River in the U.S. state of Alaska.

A post office operated here from 1941 to 1964. The residents of Holikachuk relocated to Grayling in 1962. The name of the village is also the source for the name of the Holikachuk Athabaskan language.

== Geography ==
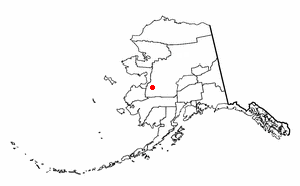
Location of Holikachuk Village, Alaska

Holikachuk Village is located in the Yukon-Koyukuk Census Area on the north bank of the Innoko River.

== Demographics ==
Historical population
Census	Pop.	Note	%±
1890	114		—
1940	77		—
1950	98		27.3%
1960	122		24.5%
U.S. Decennial Census

Holikachuk first appeared on the 1890 U.S. Census as the unincorporated community of "Holikitsak." It next appeared on the 1940 U.S. Census as "Holocachaket." In 1950 and 1960, it returned as Holikachuk. Owing to its abandonment in the 1960s, it has not appeared on the census since.
