= Anvik River =

- Location of the mouth of the Anvik River in Alaska
- Native name: Tuilnguq (Central Yupik)

Location
- Country: United States
- State: Alaska
- Census Area: Yukon–Koyukuk

Physical characteristics
- Source: Nulato Hills
  - coordinates: 63°39′26″N 160°07′26″W
  - elevation: 1,797 ft (548 m)
- Mouth: Yukon River
  - location: 1.5 miles (2.4 km) north of Anvik
  - coordinates: 62°40′50″N 160°12′11″W
  - elevation: 52 ft (16 m)
- Length: 140 mi (230 km)

The Anvik River (/ˈæn.vɪk/) (Yup'ik: Tuilnguq) is a 140-mile (230 km) tributary of the Yukon River in the U.S. state of Alaska. It flows southeast from the Nulato Hills to its mouth on the larger river 1.5 miles (2.4 km) north of Anvik.

The watershed is classified is characterized by seasonal flooding, high sediment loads, and permafrost influence. Geological surveys describe the Anvik-Andreafski region as dominated by schist, quartzite, and alluvial deposits, which contribute to the river's sediment load and seasonal flow variations. The river's annual discharge patterns significantly impact fish migration and habitat conditions, particularly salmon species.

The annual production of summer chum salmon (Oncorhynchus keta) along the Anvik River is thought to be the largest in the Yukon River basin. The river has excellent fishing for four species of salmon as well as northern pike, sheefish, Arctic char, rainbow trout, and grayling.

Rated Class 1 (easy) on the International Scale of River Difficulty, about 121 miles (195 km) of the Anvik is suitable for floating by open canoes, folding boats and kayaks, and inflatable canoes, kayaks, and rafts. Floatplanes, riverboats, and wheeled airplanes that can land on gravel bars can transport boaters as far as McDonald Creek, near the headwaters.

== Ecological Importance ==
=== Salmon Runs & Fisheries ===
The Alaska Department of Fish and Game (ADF&G) operates the Anvik River Sonar Project to monitor chum salmon population, with annual returns averaging between 400,000 and 800,000 fish.

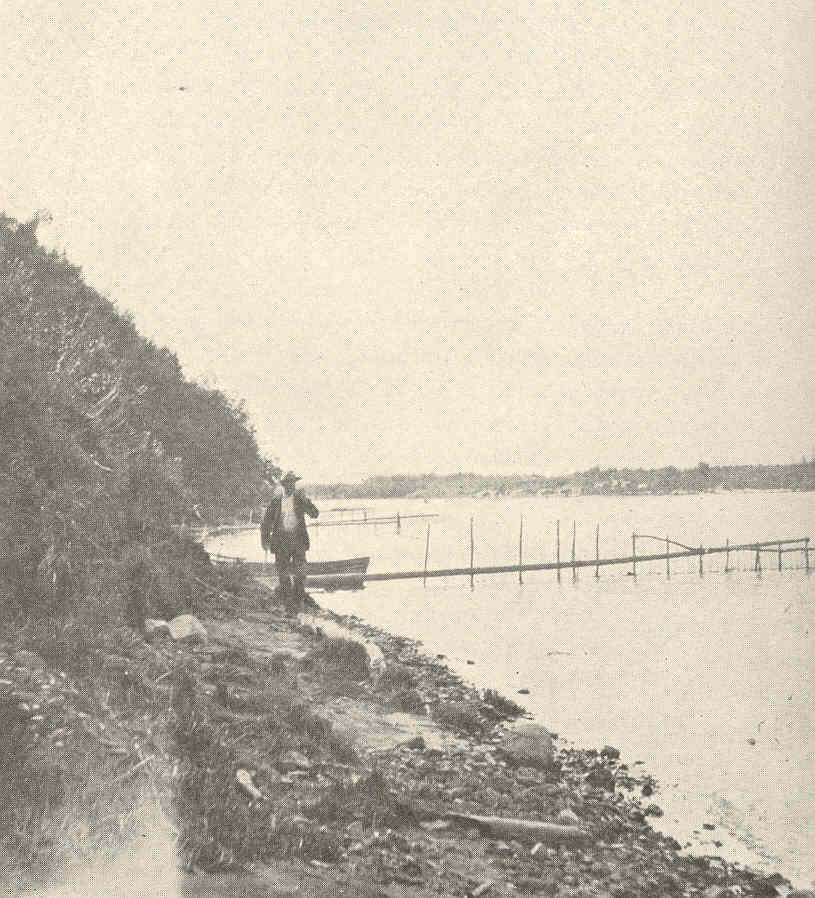
Native Fish Traps on the Anvik River. The town of Anvik is shown in the background.

Other important fish species in the river include:

- Chinook salmon (Oncorhynchus tshawytscha) – prized for their size and importance for subsistence and sport fishing.
- Coho salmon (Oncorhynchus kisutch) – commercially important for recreational and small-scale fishing.
- Whitefish species (Coregonus sp.) – a staple in Indigenous diets.
- Northern pike (Esox lucius) – a key predator in the ecosystem.
- Sheefish (Stenodus leucichthys) – valued for their large size and firm meat.
- Arctic grayling (Thymallus arcticus) – an indicator species for water quality.

Despite the river's productivity, climate change and commercial fishing pressures in the Bering Sea have contributed to salmon population declines, leading to conservation efforts to protect habitat and improve sustainability.

=== Wildlife & Habitat ===
The Anvik River's wetlands and riparian forests provide critical habitat for moose, black & grizzly bears, bald eagles, and beavers. The river's floodplains and oxbow lakes serve as spawning and nursery grounds for fish and migratory bird species.

The Innoko National Wildlife Refuge encompasses parts of the Anvik watershed, providing protection for these species that rely on the river for food and habitat.

== Cultural and Indigenous Significance ==
The Deg Hit'an Athabaskans, the Indigenous people of the lower Yukon River, have relied on the Anvik River for subsistence fishing, hunting, and seasonal camps for centuries.

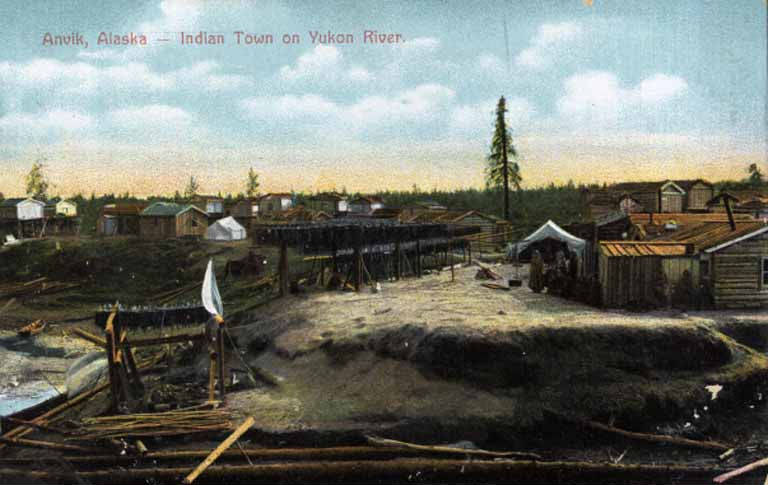
Ingalik Indian village of Anvik with fish drying racks, right bank of the Yukon River at the mouth of the Anvik River, circa 1901.

Fishing remains central to food security and cultural traditions in the region. According to oral histories, traditional ecological knowledge (TEK) has long informed Indigenous fishing practices, ensuring sustainable harvesting methods. The Deg Hit'an use fish traps, dipnets, and set nets, adapting to seasonal fish migrations. Whitefish, northern pike, and salmon are smoked or dried for long-term storage.

In modern times, subsistence fishing is regulated through state and federal management. However, declining salmon runs and climate-driven habitat shifts have raised concerns about the long-term sustainability of Indigenous food systems.

== Economic Impact ==
=== Subsistence Fishing ===
Subsistence fishing is the primary economic and cultural activity in Anvik and nearby villages. Most households rely on fish harvests rather than store-bought food, due to the region's remote nature and high transportation costs.

A 2005 study estimated that over 90% of households in Anvik engage in subsistence fishing, with salmon, whitefish, and pike being the most commonly harvested species.

=== Commercial & Sport Fisheries ===
Historically, commercial salmon fishing provided economic opportunities for rural communities along the Yukon River. However, global competition, declining fish stocks, and stricter regulations have led to a near-collapse of commercial fisheries in the Anvik region. Government relief programs, such as the Yukon River Salmon Disaster Relief Fund, have been implemented to support affected communities.

The Anvik River and nearby Innoko River drainage are popular destinations for sport fishing, particularly for northern pike and sheefish. Guided fishing trips attract anglers, bringing seasonal revenue to local businesses. However, the rise in tourism-related fishing activities has raised concerns about their impact on subsistence fisheries.

== Conservation & Environmental Challenges ==
=== Climate Change ===
Rising temperatures, permafrost thawing, and changing precipitation patterns have significantly altered streamflow, fish migration and ice breakup patterns. Warmer winters have resulted in reduced snowpack and earlier spring floods, disrupting salmon spawning cycles and reducing egg survival rates. Additionally, increasing water temperatures have negatively impacted oxygen levels, threatening juvenile salmon and other fish species.

=== Industrial Threats & Overfishing ===
The proposed Donlin Gold Mine, located upstream in the Yukon-Kuskokwim region, has raised concerns about potential water pollution from cyanide leaching and heavy metal runoff. If developed, this mine could impact salmon spawning habitat downstream.

Commercial fishing operations in the Bering Sea and lower Yukon River have contributed to declining salmon stocks. Bycatch, particularly from trawl fisheries, has had unintended consequences on Yukon River salmon runs, including those that migrate up the Anvik River. Conservation groups have advocated for stricter bycatch regulations and Indigenous-led fisheries management to mitigate these impacts.

=== Community-Led Conservation ===
Efforts to restore salmon populations and protect the river's ecosystem include habitat restoration initiatives led by the Innoko National Wildlife Refuge, which focuses on preserving riparian zones and spawning habitats for native fish species. Additionally, the Yukon River Salmon Final Draft Spend Plan incorporated funding to support salmon conservation research, including stock-specific distribution models to improve Yukon River chum salmon run forecasting and mapping changes in spawning tributaries. Indigenous co-management programs have played a crucial role in conservation efforts. The Tanana Chiefs Conference, ADF&G, and University of Alaska Fairbanks have worked together to document Indigenous fishing knowledge, map traditional harvest sites, and integrate TEK into fisheries management policies. ADF&G's sonar-based fish count project also continues to monitor population trends and inform sustainable fishing policies.

Local conservation organizations are advocating for state and federal policies that prioritize salmon conservation over commercial exploitation.

== See also ==
- List of rivers of Alaska
