= Kathleen Carlo-Kendall =

American painter

Kathleen Carlo-Kendall (born in Tanana, Alaska) is a Koyukon Athabaskan professional carver from Alaska.

== Background ==
Kathleen Carlo was born in Tanana, Alaska, the daughter of Poldine and William "Bill" Carlo. She moved to Fairbanks at the age of five where she lives today. She started making her artwork from the Native Arts Center in the University of Alaska, Fairbanks. Her teacher was Ronald Senungetuk. She has always loved artwork since her highschool years. Kathleen's artwork sometimes symbolizes an event or spirit, other times it is just what comes out of the shape of the wood. She received a Bachelor of Fine Arts in Metalsmithing, but she doesn't consider herself a metalsmith, but more of a woodworker.

== Art career ==
Kathleen received her Bachelor of Fine Arts degree in 1984 from the University of Alaska Fairbanks. She was one of only a few women to carve masks at that time. Besides mask making, Kathleen also enjoys working with panels of wood and metals, ice sculpting, and teaching. Since 1990, she has worked as a Native Arts Carving Instructor for the University of Alaska Summer Fine Arts Camp. She has won many awards for her work and twice has been chosen for Percent for Art Commissions. Her works are seen in the collections of the University of Alaska State Museum, Permanent Solo Exhibition Case; the Alaska State Council on the Arts, Contemporary Art Bank; the U.S. Department of the Interior, Indian Arts and Crafts Board; Anchorage Museum of History and Art; Doyon Limited, and numerous private collections in and outside Alaska.

== Style ==
She uses metal and wood together, the hardness of the metal and the softness of the wood, make for a beautiful combination. She considers herself a contemporary native artist as opposed to a traditional artist. As masks (denaanaan' edeetonee in Central Koyukon) were not used extensively by her people, she turned to the sculpture of the Yup'ik masks and other cultures for inspiration.
