= Poldine Carlo =

American author and Koyukon elder (1920–2018)

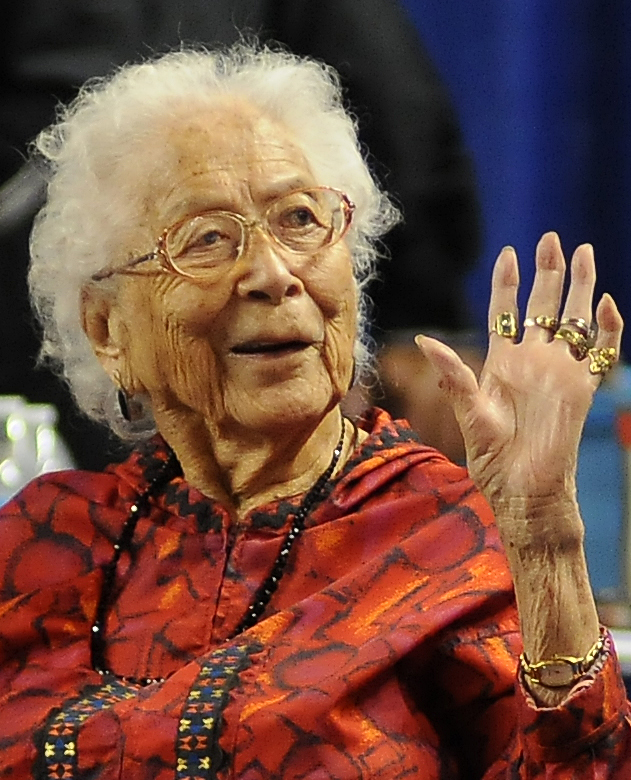
- Poldine Carlo greets a visitor during the 2014 World Eskimo Indian Olympics
- Born: Poldine Demoski; December 5, 1920; Nulato, Territory of Alaska, U.S.
- Died: May 9, 2018 (aged 97); Fairbanks, Alaska, U.S.
- Occupation: Author
- Spouse: William "Bill" Carlo (m. 1940)
- Children: 8 (including Kathleen Carlo)

Poldine Demoski Carlo (December 5, 1920 – May 9, 2018) was an American author and an elder of the Koyukon Alaskan Athabaskans, native people of Alaska.

Born in Nulato, Territory of Alaska, Carlo was a founding member of the Fairbanks Native Association (FNA) and also served for the Alaska Bicentennial Commission board, as well as a consultant for the Tanana Chiefs Conference (TCC). She was the author of Nulato: An Indian Life on the Yukon, which was dedicated in memory of her son, Stewart, who died in 1975 in an auto accident.

Carlo married William "Bill" Carlo in 1940. The marriage produced eight children: five sons (William Jr., Kenny, Walter, Glenn and Stewart), and three daughters (Dorothy, Lucy and Kathleen). She resided in Fairbanks, Alaska, where she died on May 9, 2018 at the age of 97.

A building in downtown Fairbanks owned by FNA was christened the Poldine Carlo Building in her honor.
