= Holikachuk language =

Extinct Athabaskan language of US

Holikachuk
- Doogh Qinag
- Native to: United States
- Region: Alaska (lower Yukon River, Innoko River)
- Ethnicity: Holikachuk
- Extinct: 2012, with the death of Wilson Deacon
- Language family: Na-Dené: Athabaskan; Northern Athabaskan; Holikachuk
- Writing system: Latin (Northern Athabaskan alphabet)

Official status
- Official language in: Alaska

Language codes
- ISO 639-3: hoi
- Glottolog: holi1241
- ELP: Holikachuk

Holikachuk (own name: Doogh Qinag) is a recently extinct Athabaskan language formerly spoken at the village of Holikachuk (Hiyeghelinhdi) on the Innoko River in central Alaska. In 1962, residents of Holikachuk relocated to Grayling on the lower Yukon River. Holikachuk is intermediate between the Deg Xinag and Koyukon languages, linguistically closer to Koyukon but socially much closer to Deg Xinag, which has influenced it. Though it was recognized by scholars as a distinct language as early as the 1840s, it was only definitively identified in the 1970s. Of about 180 Holikachuk people, only about 5 spoke the language in 2007. In March 2012, the last living fluent speaker of Holikachuk died in Alaska.

James Kari compiled a short dictionary of Holikachuk in 1978, but Holikachuk remains one of the least documented Alaska Native languages.

== Phonology ==
=== Consonants ===
Holikachuk consonants
		Labial	Dental	Alveolar			Palatal	Velar	Uvular	Glottal
		Labial	Dental	plain	sibilant	lateral	Palatal	Velar	Uvular	Glottal
Plosive/ Affricate	plain		tθ ⟨ddh⟩	t ⟨d⟩	ts ⟨dz⟩	tɬ ⟨dl⟩		k ⟨g⟩	q ⟨G⟩	ʔ ⟨ʼ⟩
Plosive/ Affricate	aspirated		tθʰ ⟨tth⟩	tʰ ⟨t⟩	tsʰ ⟨ts⟩	tɬʰ ⟨tł⟩		kʰ ⟨k⟩	qʰ ⟨q⟩	
Plosive/ Affricate	ejective		tθʼ ⟨tthʼ⟩	tʼ ⟨tʼ⟩	tsʼ ⟨tsʼ⟩	tɬʼ ⟨tłʼ⟩		kʼ ⟨kʼ⟩	qʼ ⟨qʼ⟩	
Fricative	voiceless		θ ⟨th⟩		s ⟨s⟩	ɬ ⟨ł⟩			χ ⟨x⟩	h ⟨h⟩
Fricative	voiced		ð ⟨dh⟩		z ⟨z⟩	ɮ ⟨l⟩			ʁ ⟨gh⟩	
Sonorant	voiced	m ⟨m⟩		n ⟨n⟩			j ⟨y⟩	ŋ ⟨ng⟩		
Sonorant	voiceless			n̥ ⟨nh⟩			j̊ ⟨yh⟩	ŋ̊ ⟨ngh⟩		

=== Vowels ===
Holikachuk vowels
	Front	Central	Back
Near-close	ɪ ⟨i⟩		ʊ ⟨u⟩
Close-mid	eː ⟨e⟩		oː ⟨oo⟩
Open-mid			ɔː ⟨o⟩
Open		aː ⟨a⟩	

== Orthography ==
Holikachuk alphabet
A a	D d	Ddh ddh	Dh dh	Dl dl	Dz dz	E e	G g
Gg gg	Gh gh	H h	I i	K k	K' k'	L l	Ł ł
M m	N n	ng	nh	O o	Oo oo	Q q	Q' q'
S s	T t	T' t'	Th th	Tl tl	Tl' tl'	Ts ts	Ts' ts'
Tth tth	Tth' tth'	U u	X x	Y y	yh	Z z	'

== Lexicon ==
Some Holikachuk words:

- łoogg fish
- łoogg dood mininh iligh November (literally: 'month when the eels come [swim]')
- giggootth scales
- q’oon’ fish eggs
- nathdlod Indian ice cream
