= Alaska Native storytelling =

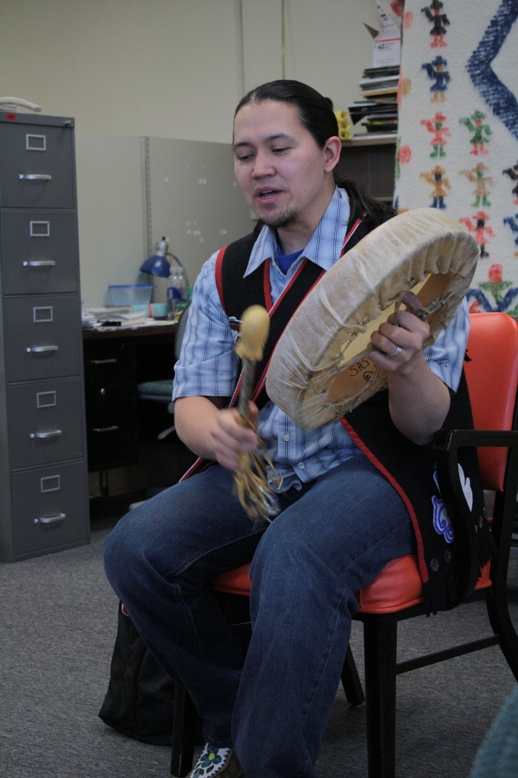
Lance Twitchell, a member of the Tlingit tribe, performing a traditional Tlingit song.

Alaska Native storytelling has been passed down through generations by means of oral presentation. The stories tell life lessons or serve as lessons in heritage. Many different aspects of Arctic life are incorporated into each story, mainly the various animals found in Alaska. Due to the decline in the number of speakers of native languages in Alaska and a change in lifestyle amongst many of the native peoples, oral storytelling has become less common. In recent years many of these stories have been written down, though many people argue that the telling of the story is just as important as the words within.

== History ==
The beginning of the decline of native speakers of Alaska Native languages can be traced back to the colonization of Alaska by the United States of America. At this time, many native people were separated from their traditional lifestyles and subsequently their native languages. Due to a new-found language barrier, new generations of Alaska Natives could not communicate with their elders and therefore could not inherit all of the traditional stories. New technology has also reinvigorated the art through various webcasts and other online mediums; however the amount of native speakers is still declining. Despite the rapid decline in spoken Alaska Native languages, the tradition of storytelling in Alaska remains alive.

== Storytellers ==
Storytellers pass down myths, legends, and traditions within their tribes. They use inflection in their voices, hand gestures and movement to tell the stories. When performing, tellers wear traditional clothing and other garments. They also bring objects such as carvings, rugs, and pottery to represent the teller's tribe. Tellers do not censor the stories; the children hear exactly the same stories older generations have listened to.

Short tales are often told by anyone who has memorized the story. It may also be told at any time. The stories are retold to the youth to promote proper behavior in their culture; storytellers learn the stories through repeated tellings. Tellers are allowed to change and add to a short story and sometimes seek suggestions from fellow storytellers on what they can correct or add to their tellings.

Tribes are more strict with traditional tales, which are usually told by the Elders. Storytellers learn long, complicated stories by being apprenticed with Elders. The tellers are required to recite the stories accurately before delivering it to an audience. The stories do not have to be told the same way, but each retelling must include all the elements.

Before telling a story, the storyteller begins with a formatted introduction. The introduction includes the storyteller’s English and Native names, hometown, family background, and how they learned the story. If the story does not belong to them, they must also honor the owner or credit the source. Part of storytelling is the interaction between the storyteller and the audience. The audience and their response to the story influence how the story is told. The teller reads the audience’s body language and determines how to continue with the story; depending on the response, tellers may choose to speed up, slow down, or finish a story. Storytellers also encourage audience participation to keep the listeners interested in the story. Storytellers do not tell the audience the moral or point of the story; it is up to them to figure it out on their own. During a telling, the audience generates mental images of what is happening and they create different versions of the story. In the end, each audience member leaves the performance with his or her own understanding of the story.

== Nature ==
Nature is a huge part of the lives of Alaska Natives and it has an influence on their story-telling. Alaska Natives tell stories where nature plays a main role. Nature is a great influence in the story-telling because native people have respect for it.

The seasons play a large role in Alaska Native storytelling. When the events in a story involve the seasons, the relating elements are used. There are bodies of water, forests, mountains and tundra mentioned in a story when the events in a story are based on seasons other than winter. The spring, summer and fall play a smaller part in Native stories, but when these seasons are used, the story usually involves people hiking in the wild. When the events are based in a season other than the winter, aspects of an Alaskan summer, like longer days and sunshine, are involved.

The majority of stories are set in winter. Winter is usually described as cruel and harsh, with extremely cold temperatures, heavy snowfall, and biting winds. When the story is centered during winter, the story-tellers will use the forces in nature such as the snow, wind storms, blizzards, and the ice. A massive part of Alaska’s region is covered by glaciers and it influences the storytelling.

Plants do not have as vital of a part in the storytelling as seasons have. Some plants and trees are described in the stories that are found in Alaska’s wilds: birch (regular and dwarf), spruce, wild roses, as well as different kinds of bushes. The ice pack and the mountains are often described in story-telling because a large part of Alaska’s country is covered with them, making them a large influence on the Alaska Native peoples.

== Animals ==
Storytelling in Alaska Native culture is heavily influenced by animals that are a part of the tribes’ everyday lives. Animals are given the star roles in the stories, both the actor and the main theme. The animals symbolize many things such as their beliefs or taboos of a tribe or clan. The stories are told about the marking of seasons, when the salmon come into the streams or when the moose lose their antlers. Animals in story-telling can provide a joyful and humorous experience for the tribe during the winter months.

Animals can play the roles of tricksters in the stories. Common trickster figures in Native American mythology include the rabbit in the Eastern regions, the coyote and spider in the Plains and the Southwest regions, and the raven in the Pacific Northwest. Numerous animals appear in myths and legends and they rarely have purely animal characteristics. The animals are gifted with the power of speech and human attributes. The animals in the stories interact with people and frequently change between human and animal form. The stories and themes are constructed around one main animal, like for example the badger, loon, and or beaver. These animals are not as popular as the Raven or Crow. The raven and or crow are the most popular characters in native folklore.

Amongst the many tribes in Alaska, the raven shares the same meanings, such as the trickster, always getting into trouble, events such as bringing light into the world . The raven symbolizes helping the people and shaping the world. These stories about helping and shaping the world are: "How Raven brought light to the World," a Haida legend, "Raven Steals the Sun," an Eyak story, “Raven Steals the Light,” an Athabascan legend, "Raven and His Grandmother," an Aleut story, "The origin of light," an Eskimo legend, "Raven" a Tlingit story, "Raven becomes voracious," a Tsimshain legend. These stories all have a main thread running through them about the raven, he is a trickster, but ends up helping the people.

== Life lessons ==
Many different aspects are incorporated into the composition of a traditional Alaska Native story narrative. There are tales written with the specific purpose of passing history itself on from one generation to the next. In others, pieces of nature that are incorporated can take on a life of their own. Animals can be deified and worshipped or be cast in the part of a trickster such as the raven or coyote. As with any culture, there are stories told to explain a broad spectrum of life‘s aspects, and others are created to express humor alone. Found within many of the stories that have been recorded, some still told today, are a set of valuable life lessons that are handed down through the relationship of the storyteller and the avid listener.

Woven into a great adventure or a fantastic tale various ideals can be easily recognized within many Alaska Native stories. These ideals are painted directly into the heart of the story making it a great lesson for the avid listener. Such stories are told to teach the young, or to remind someone that has forgotten one of these important principles. Respecting nature, honoring family and tribe, having faith and trust, or getting along with their fellow men are several that are characteristic and thought important enough to pass on.

Guidance is another prevalent aspect found accompanying the ideals within many Alaska Native stories. This guidance offers warnings against apparent evils such as pride, envy, poor decision making, or committing sins. In one classic Tlingit tale retold by S.E. Schlosser and entitled “How selfishness was rewarded”, a woman uses a magical combination of words to summon fish from the ocean late at night. She then cooks and consumes this fish while her family sleeps keeping all of the catch for herself. Eventually she is caught by her family and is punished for her selfish ways. She is magically transformed into an owl, not by her family but, by the magic she had come so accustomed to. The tale ends with, "To this day, the plaintive hoot of the owl may be heard in the wilds of Alaska, reminding those who hear it of the price a young girl once paid for her selfishness. "

The different types of lessons on guidance along with the virtues that are shared and passed along through the tribe’s generations are an important element of the ancient and rich Alaska Native culture and they stories they create.

== See also ==
- Salishan oral narratives
