= Deg Xitʼan =

Ethnic group

Deg Hitʼan
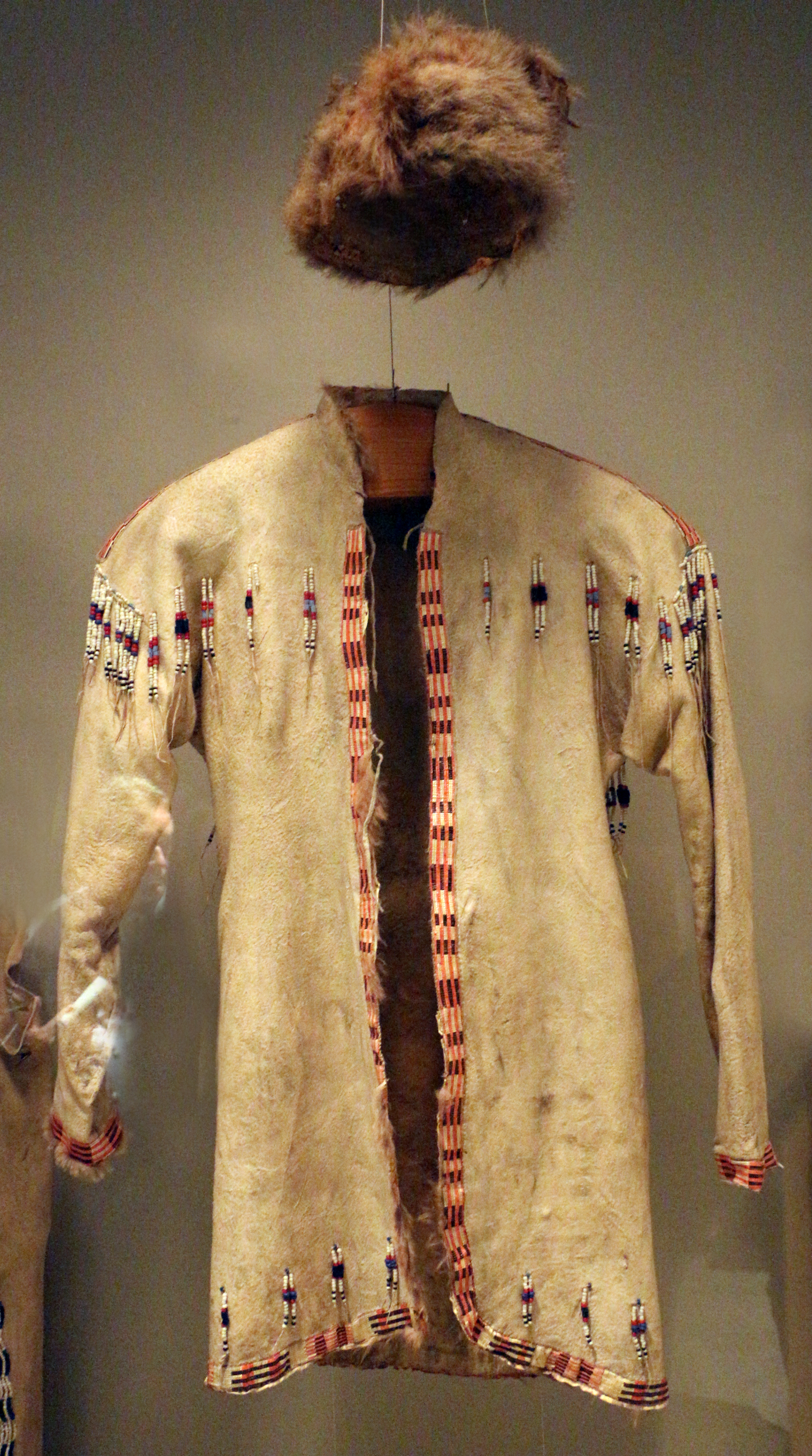
- Traditional Deg Xit'an clothing in the Field Museum of Natural History

Total population
- 250 (speakers of language only)

Regions with significant populations
- USA (Alaska)

Languages
- English, Deg Xinag

Religion
- Christianity

Related ethnic groups
- Yup'ik, Koyukon, Holikachuk, Dena'ina

Deg Xitʼan (Degexit'an pronunciation: [tek χitʼan]) (also Deg Hitʼan, Deg Hitan, Degexitʼan, Kaiyuhkhotana, Russian: Дег-хитан) is a group of Athabaskan peoples in Alaska. Their native language is called Deg Xinag. They reside in Alaska along the Anvik River in Anvik, along the Innoko River in Shageluk, and at Holy Cross along the lower Yukon River.

The Deg Hitʼan are members of the federally recognized Alaska Native tribes of Anvik Village, Shageluk Native Village, and Holy Cross Village. The Iditarod Trail's antecedents were the native trails of the Dena'ina and Deg Hitʼan Athabaskan Indians and the Inupiaq Eskimos.

Their neighbors are other Athabaskan-speaking and Yupik Eskimo peoples: Yup'ik (west and south), Holikachuk (north), Upper Kuskokwim (north and east), and Dena'ina (south).

== Name ==
The autonyms used by this group of Athabaskan people are: Deg Xitʼan (local people) and Deg Xinag (local language). Sometimes the Deg Xitʼan or Deg Hitʼan is used for the language in English. There is no contrast between /χ/ and /h/ in the verb prefixes of Deg Xinag, and acoustic evidence indicates that the normative pronunciation in that context is [χ] rather than [h].

The most common older name is Ingalik (from Yup'ik Ingqiliq «traditionally Athabaskan; now also any other Indian», literally «having louse's eggs» < ingqiq «nit, louse nit, egg of louse» + a postbase -liq «one who is V; one who Vs; one having V; one similar to N») and its derivatives are offensive to the Deg Hitʼan. In the old literature, the name Anvik-Shageluk Ingalik (also Kuskokwim Ingalik and Yukon Ingalik) is used for Deg Hitʼan, and the name McGrath Ingalik is used for Upper Kuskokwim people.

== Notable members ==
- * Deenaalee Chase-Hodgdon, commercial fisher, collective founder, and storyteller
