= Koyukon =

Ethnic group native to Alaska, United States

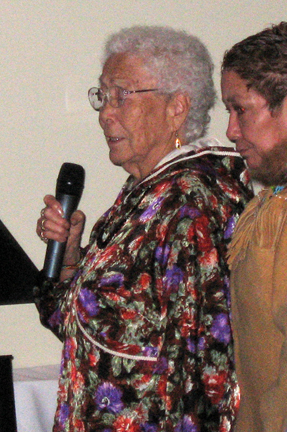
- Poldine Carlo, Koyukon author, 2007

Regions with significant populations
- United States (Alaska): 2,300

Languages
- American Indian English, Koyukon, Russian (historically)

Religion
- Christianity, Animism

Related ethnic groups
- Deg Hit'an, Holikachuk, Gwich'in, other Northern Athabaskan peoples

The Koyukon, Dinaa, or Denaa (Denaakk'e: Tl’eeyegge Hut’aane) are an Alaska Native Athabascan people of the Athabascan-speaking ethnolinguistic group. Their traditional territory is along the Koyukuk and Yukon rivers where they subsisted for thousands of years by hunting and trapping. Many Koyukon live in a similar manner today.

The Koyukon language belongs to a large family called Athabascan, which in turn is a branch of the larger Na-Dené languages traditionally spoken by numerous groups of native people throughout northwestern North America. In addition, ancient migrations of related peoples led to other Na-Dené languages, such as Navajo and Apachean languages, being spoken in the American Southwest and in Mexico.

== History ==
The first Europeans to enter Koyukon territory were Russians, who came up the Yukon River to Nulato in 1838. When they arrived, they found that items such as iron pots, glass beads, cloth apparel, and tobacco had already reached the people through their trade with coastal Eskimos, who had long traded with Russians. An epidemic of smallpox had preceded them, causing high fatalities in the village. In subsequent years, European infectious diseases drastically reduced the Koyukon population, who had no immunity to these new diseases.

Relative isolation persisted along the Koyukuk until 1898, when the Yukon Gold Rush brought more than a thousand men to the river. They found little gold, and most left the following winter.

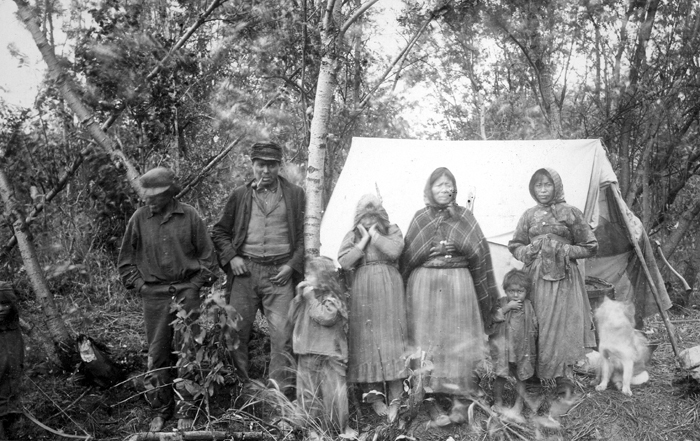
Koyukon people on left bank of Koyukuk River, 195 miles above its mouth, September 6, 1898.

Archaeological evidence suggests that the Koyukon people have inhabited their region for at least 1,000 years, with cultural roots there that stretch back thousands of years earlier.

== Ethnobotany ==
The Koyukon freeze lingonberries for winter use.

== Notable Koyukon ==
- Nikoosh Carlo, PhD, scientist and policy advisor. Dr. Carlo served as Senior Advisor, Climate & Arctic Policy to the Governor of Alaska (2017–18), Senior Advisor, U.S. Department of State for the U.S. Chairmanship of the Arctic Council (2015–2017), Public Voices Fellow at the Yale Program on Climate Change Communication and as executive director, Alaska Arctic Policy Commission (2013–2015).
- Poldine Carlo, writer and elder
- Kathleen Carlo-Kendall, professional carver artist
- Mary Jane Fate, activist and leader
- Walter Harper, first man known to reach the summit of Denali (Mount McKinley), in June 1913
- Emil Notti, American engineer, Indigenous activist and Democratic politician
- Michael J. Stickman, First Chief of the Nuwato Tribal Council
- Morris Thompson, businessman and leader
