= Alaskan Athabaskans =

Athabaskan-speaking Alaska Native group

Alaskan Athabascans
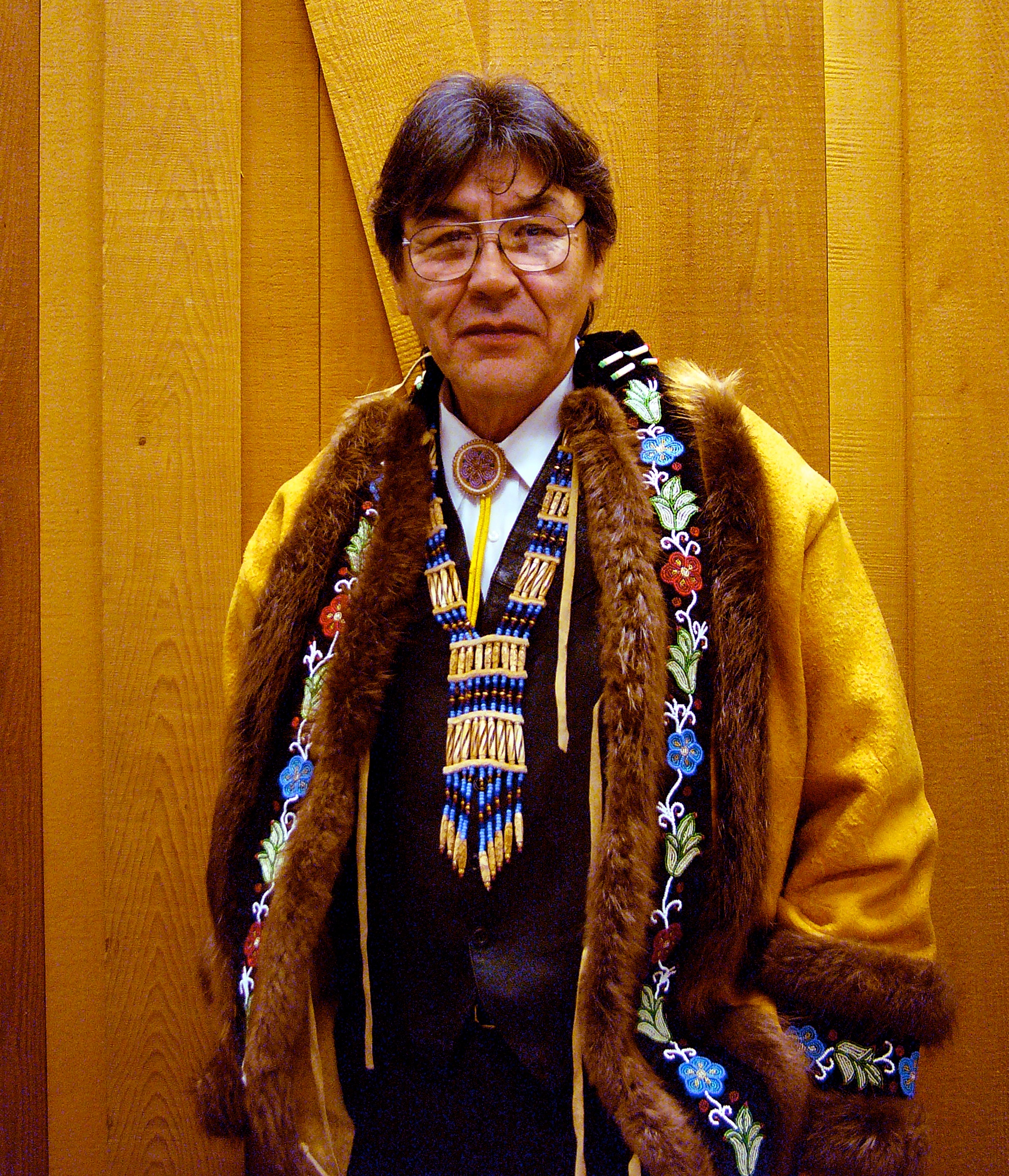
- Former Gwichʼin grand chief Clarence Alexander in 2004

Total population
- 6,400

Regions with significant populations
- Alaska

Languages
- Northern Athabaskan languages, American Indian English (Alaskan variant), Russian (historically)

Religion
- Shamanism (largely ex), Christianity

The Alaskan Athabascans, Alaskan Athapascans or Dena (Russian: атабаски Аляски, атапаски Аляски) are Alaska Native peoples of the Athabaskan-speaking ethnolinguistic group. They are considered the descendants of the original inhabitants of the interior of Alaska.

Formerly they identified as a people by the word Tinneh (nowadays Dena; cf. Dene for Canadian Athabaskans). Taken from their own language, it means simply "men" or "people".

== Subgroups ==
In Alaska, where they are the oldest, there are eleven groups identified by the languages they speak. These are:

- Dena’ina or Tanaina (Ht’ana)
- Ahtna or Copper River Athabascan (Hwt’aene)
- Deg Hit’an or Ingalik (Hitʼan)
- Holikachuk (Hitʼan)
- Koyukon (Hut’aane)
- Upper Kuskokwim or Kolchan (Hwt’ana)
- Tanana or Lower Tanana (Kokht’ana)
- Tanacross or Tanana Crossing (Koxt’een)
- Upper Tanana (Kohtʼiin)
- Gwich'in or Kutchin (Gwich’in)
- Hän (Hwëch’in).

== Life and culture ==
The Alaskan Athabascan culture is an inland creek and river fishing (also coastal fishing by only Dena'ina of Cook Inlet) and hunter-gatherer culture. The Alaskan Athabascans have a matrilineal system in which children belong to the mother's clan, with the exception of the Yupikized Athabaskans (Holikachuk and Deg Hit'an).

The Athabascan people hold potlatches which have religious, social and economic significance.

Dogs were their only domesticated animal, but were and are an integral element in their culture for the Athabascan population in North America.

== History ==
Athabascans are descended from Asian hunter-gatherers, likely originally native to Mongolia, who crossed the Bering Strait and settled in North America.

== Notable Alaskan Athabascans ==
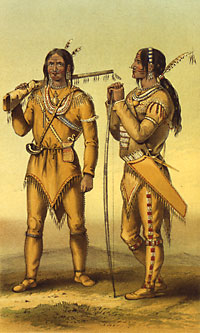
1847 illustration of Gwich'in hunters

- George Attla (August 8, 1933 – February 15, 2015) was a champion sprint dog musher.
- Poldine Carlo (December 5, 1920 – May 9, 2018) was an American author and Athabascan elder.
- Kathleen Carlo-Kendall is a professional sculptor.
- Quinn Christopherson is an American singer-songwriter. He won the 2019 Tiny Desk Contest with his entry "Erase Me," a song describing his experience with male privilege and erasure as a transgender man.
- Peter Kalifornsky is an author and oral storyteller.
- Emil Notti is an American engineer, indigenous activist and democratic politician who was key in the development of the Alaska Native Claims Settlement Act.
- John Sackett (1944–2021) served in the Alaska House of Representatives from 1967 to 1971 and in the Alaska Senate from 1973 to 1987.
- Michael Stickman is the First Chief of the Nulato Tribal Council.
- Mary TallMountain (June 19, 1918 – September 2, 1994) was a poet and storyteller of mixed Scotch-Irish and Koyukon ancestry.
- F. Kay Wallis (born c. 1944) is traditional healer and member of Alaska House of Representatives.
- Siobhan Wescott, physician and public health advocate; she has served as director of the American Indian Health Program and is a professor of American Indian health at the University of Nebraska.

== See also ==
- Tanana Chiefs Conference (all Alaskan Athabaskans' [excl. Ahtna and Dena'ina] a territorial-level organization)
- Doyon, Limited
- Alaska Native Language Center
- Alaska Federation of Natives
- Indian ice cream (Alaska)
- Athabascan fiddle
