= Hän language =

Northern Athabaskan language

Hän
- Häł gołan
- Pronunciation: [hɑɬ goɬæn]
- Native to: Canada, United States
- Region: Alaska (United States), Yukon (Canada)
- Ethnicity: Hän people
- Native speakers: 5 in Alaska, none in Yukon (2020)
- Language family: Na-Dené: Athabaskan; Northern Athabaskan; Hän
- Writing system: Latin (Dené alphabet)

Official status
- Official language in: Alaska

Language codes
- ISO 639-3: haa
- Glottolog: hann1241
- ELP: Han
- Han is classified as Critically Endangered by the UNESCO Atlas of the World's Languages in Danger.

Hän (alternatively spelled as Haen) (also known as Han-Kutchin) is a Northern Athabaskan language spoken by the Hän Hwëch'in (translated to people who live along the river, sometimes anglicized as Hankutchin). The Hän language is spoken and supported by the Hän nation across localized communities who, since time immemorial, have lived in what is today called the Upper Yukon region; The village of Eagle, Alaska, in the United States; the town of Dawson City, Yukon Territory, in Canada; as well as Fairbanks and Tanacross in Alaska.

== Dialects ==
Hän is today considered to have two dialects; the Eagle Dialect, named for its use in Eagle Village, and the Moosehide dialect, named for Moosehide, a traditional village of the Trʼondëk Hwëchʼin First Nation in the Yukon.

== Classification ==
Hän is in the Northern Athabaskan subgrouping of the Na-Dené language family. It is most closely related to Gwich'in and Upper Tanana. Hän is sometimes referred to as a ʼHead Waters Athabaskanʼ language, an informal grouping that includes Hän, Gwichʼin, Northern Tutchone, Southern Tutchone, and Upper Tanana.

== History ==
The decline of the Hän language is due in large part to a mass migration of 100,000 prospectors to the Klondike region of the Yukon (the Klondike Gold Rush) in 1898 and immense precarity and violence endured by its communities that is perpetuated today through colonial occupation by Canada and the United States. On April 6, 2024, the last fluent speaker of Hän in Yukon, elder Percy Henry, estimated to be about 96, died.

== Revitalization ==
There are fewer than a dozen first language speakers of Hän, all of whom are elderly though there is a growing second-language speaker community.

The Trʼondëk Hwëchʼin (formerly known as the Dawson First Nation) in the Yukon Territory support the revitalization of Hän, and there are current efforts to revive the language locally. There is an effort to promote traditional skills and finding a balance between the way of the newcomers which further promotes the development and revitalization of the language.

Since 1991, the Robert Service School in Dawson City has hosted the Hän Language program, and the Trʼondëk Hwëchʼin supports adult language classes and bi-annual cultural gatherings.

There are many other resources used to learn Hän, particularly online ones such as, FirstVoices and Yukon Native Learning Centre. These online learning language tools teach the tradition, culture, history, and the language of Hän.

== Phonology ==
=== Consonants ===
The consonants of Hän are listed below with IPA notation on the left, the Moosehide dialect orthography in ⟨brackets⟩:

Consonants
		Labial	Inter- dental	Alveolar			Post- alveolar	Retroflex	Velar	Glottal
		Labial	Inter- dental	median	sibilant	lateral	Post- alveolar	Retroflex	Velar	Glottal
Plosive/ Affricate	plain	p ⟨b⟩	tθ ⟨ddh⟩	t ⟨d⟩	ts ⟨dz⟩	tɬ ⟨dl⟩	tʃ ⟨j⟩	ʈʂ ⟨dr⟩	k ⟨g⟩	ʔ ⟨ʼ⟩
Plosive/ Affricate	aspirated	(pʰ ⟨p⟩)	tθʰ ⟨tth⟩	tʰ ⟨t⟩	tsʰ ⟨ts⟩	tɬʰ ⟨tl⟩	tʃʰ ⟨ch⟩	ʈʂʰ ⟨tr⟩	kʰ ⟨k⟩	
Plosive/ Affricate	ejective		tθʼ ⟨tth’⟩	tʼ ⟨t’⟩	tsʼ ⟨ts’⟩	tɬʼ ⟨tl’⟩	tʃʼ ⟨ch’⟩	ʈʂʼ ⟨tr’⟩	kʼ ⟨k’⟩	
Plosive/ Affricate	prenasalized	ᵐb ⟨mb⟩		ⁿd ⟨nd⟩			ⁿdʒ ⟨nj⟩			
Fricative	voiceless		θ ⟨th⟩		s ⟨s⟩	ɬ ⟨ł⟩	ʃ ⟨sh⟩	ʂ ⟨sr⟩	x ⟨kh⟩	h ⟨h⟩
Fricative	voiced		ð ⟨dh⟩		z ⟨z⟩	ɮ ⟨l⟩	ʒ ⟨zh⟩	ʐ ⟨zr⟩	ɣ ⟨gh⟩	
Sonorant	voiced	m ⟨m⟩		n ⟨n⟩		l ⟨l⟩	j ⟨y⟩	ɻ ⟨r⟩	w ⟨w⟩	
Sonorant	voiceless			n̥ ⟨nh⟩			j̊ ⟨yh⟩	ɻ̥ ⟨rh⟩	w̥ ⟨wh⟩	

=== Vowels ===
Vowels
	Front		Central		Back	
	short	long	short	long	short	long
Close	i ⟨i⟩	iː ⟨ii⟩			u ⟨u⟩	uː ⟨uu⟩
Close-mid	e ⟨e⟩	eː ⟨ee⟩			o ⟨o⟩	oː ⟨oo⟩
Mid			ə ⟨ë⟩	əː ⟨ëë⟩		
Open	æ ⟨a⟩	æː ⟨aa⟩			ɑ ⟨ä⟩	ɑː ⟨ää⟩
Diphthongs	æu ⟨aw⟩ æi ⟨ay⟩ ɑu ⟨äw⟩ eu ⟨ew⟩ ei ⟨ey⟩ iu ⟨iw⟩ oi ⟨oy⟩					

Nasal vowels are marked orthographically in Hän, and all of the monophthong vowels can be either oral or nasal. Nasal vowels are written with a small tail (akin to the Polish ogonek) at the bottom of the vowel, so, for instance, nasal /ẽ/ is written as ⟨ę⟩.
