= Northern Athabaskan languages =

Languages spoken in northwest North America

Northern Athabaskan
- Geographic distribution: Alaska, Yukon
- Ethnicity: Dene
- Linguistic classification: Na-Dené: Athabaskan–Eyak; Athabaskan; Northern Athabaskan
- Subdivisions: Southern Alaskan; Central Alaska–Yukon; Northwestern Canada; Tsetsaut †; Central British Columbia; Tsuutʼina; Kwalhioqua–Clatskanie †

Language codes
- Glottolog: None

Northern Athabaskan is a geographic sub-grouping of the Athabaskan language family spoken by indigenous peoples in the northern part of North America, particularly in Alaska (Alaskan Athabaskans), Yukon, and the Northwest Territories. The sprachraum of Northern Athabaskan languages spans the interior of Alaska to the Hudson Bay in Canada and from the Arctic Circle to the Canadian-American border. Languages in the group include Dane-zaa, Chipewyan, Babine-Witsuwitʼen, Carrier, and Slavey. The Northern Athabaskan languages consist of 31 languages that can be divided into seven geographic subgroups.

== Classification ==
- Northern Athabaskan
  - Southern Alaskan
    - Ahtna (also known as Atna, Ahtena, Copper River)
      - Central Copper River Ahtna
      - Lower Copper River Ahtna
      - Mentasta (also known as Upper Ahtna)
      - Western Ahtna
    - Dena’ina (also known as Tanaina)
      - Lower Inlet Dena’ina
        - Outer Inlet
        - Iliamna
        - Inland
      - Upper Inlet Dena’ina
  - Central Alaska–Yukon
    - Koyukon
      - Deg Xinag (also known as Deg Hit'an, Kaiyuhkhotana, Ingalik)
        - Lower Yukon River
        - Middle Kuskokwin
      - †Holikachuk (also known as Innoko, Innoka-khotana, Tlëgon-khotana)
      - Koyukon (also known as Ten’a, Co-Youkon, Co-yukon)
        - Lower Koyukon (also known as Lower Yukon Koyukon)
        - Central Koyukon (also known as Dinaakkanaaga Ts’inh Huyoza, Koyukuk River Koyukon)
        - Upper Koyukon (also known as Upper Yukon Koyukon)
      - Tanana
        - Lower Tanana (also known as Tanana, Minto, Dandey in, Dineh su, Tananatana)
          - Minto-Tolovana-Toklat-Nenana-Wood River
            - Minto-Tolovana
            - Toklat
            - Nenana
            - Wood River
          - Chena
          - Salcha-Goodpastor (also known as Middle Tanana)
        - Tanacross (also known as Tanana, Dandey in, Dineh su, Tananatana)
        - Upper Tanana (also known as Tanana, Dandey in, Dineh su, Tananatana)
          - Nabesna
          - Tetlin
          - Northway
          - Scottie Creek
          - Canadian Upper Tanana
        - Upper Kuskokwim (also known as Kolchan, Goltsan)
      - Tutchone (also known as Gens de Bois, Gunana, Nahane, Nahani, Tutchonekutchin)
        - Southern Tutchone (sometimes considered to be just a dialect)
        - Northern Tutchone (also known as Mayo) (sometimes considered to be just a dialect)
    - Kutchin–Han
      - Gwich’in (also known as Gwitch’in, Kutchin, Kootchin, Loucheux, Loucheaux, Takudh, Tukudh, "Quarrelers")
        - Alaskan Gwich’in (also known as Western Gwich’in)
        - Canadian Gwich’in (also known as Eastern Gwich’in)
      - Hän (also known as Han, Moosehide, Dawson, Gens du Fou, Han Gwich-in, Han-Kootchin, Hankutchin)
  - Northwestern Canada
    - Cordillera
      - Central Cordillera (also known as Tahltan-Tagish-Kaska)
        - †Tagish (also known as Gunana, Nahane, Nahani, Si-him-E-na, "Stick Indians", Tagisch, Tahgish, Tahkeesh, Tahk-heesh)
        - Tahltan (also known as Nahanni, Keyehotine, Nahane, Nahani, Tahl-tan, Tatltan, Ticaxhanoten, Toltan)
        - Kaska (also known as Nahanni, Nahane, Nahani, Cassiar)
      - Southeastern Cordillera
        - Sekani
        - Danezaa (also known as Beaver, Tsattine, Dunne-za, Deneza, Gens de Castor)
    - Mackenzie
      - Slavey–Hare (v Slave)
        - Slavey (also known as Slavey proper, South Slavey, Southern Slavey, Dene Tha, Esclave, Nahane, Nahani, Slave)
        - Mountain (also known as Montagnards, Nahane, Nahani, Sih gotine, Sihta gotine)
        - Bearlake (also known as Satudine, Sahtu gotine, Bear Lake)
        - Hare (also known as Kawchottine, Ka so gotine, Kancho, Kawchodinneh, Rabbitskins, Ta-na-tin-ne)
      - Dogrib (also known as Tli Cho, Tłįchǫ or Thlingchadine)
    - Chipewyan
      - Dene Suline (also known as Chipewyan, Dëne Sųłiné, Dene, Yellowknife, Montagnais, "Northern Indians", Copper Indians, Coppermine Indians, Mithcocoman, Red Knife, T’atsan ottine, Tatsotine, Yellow Knife)
  - †Tsetsaut (also known as Ts’ets’aut, Nahane, Nahani, Portland Canal, Wetalth)
  - Central British Columbia
    - Babine-Witsuwit'en (also known as North Carrier, Babine Carrier, Northern Carrier, Bulkley Valley, Lakes District, Western Carrier)
      - Babine (also known as Nadot’en, Nedut’en, Nat’oot’en)
      - Takla
      - Witsuwit’en (also known as Wetsuwet’en, Wets’uwet’en, Wet’suwet’en)
      - Moricetown
      - Francois Lake
    - Dakelh (also known as Carrier, Dakelhne, Takelne, Takulli, Taculli, Takulie, Porteur, Nagailer)
      - Central Carrier (also known as Upper Carrier)
      - Southern Carrier (also known as Lower Carrier)
    - Tsilhqotʼin (also known as Chilcotin, Tinneh, Chilkhodins, Tsilkotin)
    - †Nicola (also known as Stuwix, Nicola-Similkameen)
  - Sarsi (also known as Sarcee, Tsuu T’ina, or Tsuut’ina)
  - Kwalhioqua–Tlatskanai
    - †Kwalhioqua-Clatskanie (also known as Kwalhioqua-Tlatskanie)
      - Willapa (also known as Willoopah)
      - Suwal-Clatskanie
        - Suwal
        - Clatskanie (also known as Tlatskanie)

== Phonology ==
In at least one Northern Athabaskan language, Slavey, a shift has occurred in the fricative /θ/ to /f/; this is the same sound change found in the Cockney dialect of English.
