= Grayling, Alaska =

Grayling Sixno' Xidakagg
- City
- Location in Alaska
- Coordinates: 62°54′38″N 160°4′2″W
- Country: United States
- State: Alaska
- Census Area: Yukon-Koyukuk
- Incorporated: June 9, 1969

Government
  - Mayor: Ivan Demientieff
  - State senator: Mike Cronk (R)
  - State rep.: Rebecca Schwanke (R)

Area
  - Total: 11.24 sq mi (29.10 km^{2})
  - Land: 11.23 sq mi (29.08 km^{2})
  - Water: 0.0077 sq mi (0.02 km^{2})
- Elevation: 69 ft (21 m)

Population (2020)
  - Total: 210
  - Density: 18.7/sq mi (7.22/km^{2})
- Time zone: UTC-9 (Alaska (AKST))
  - Summer (DST): UTC-8 (AKDT)
- ZIP code: 99590
- Area code: 907
- FIPS code: 02-30060
- GNIS feature ID: 1402921

Grayling (Sixno' Xidakagg in Holikachuk language) is a city in Yukon-Koyukuk Census Area, Alaska, United States. As of the 2020 census, Grayling had a population of 210. Since 1977, the Athabaskan village has seen a surge of interest on odd-numbered years, when it is the site of a checkpoint during the Iditarod Trail Sled Dog Race. It is situated after the checkpoint at Anvik and before Eagle Island.

== Geography ==
Grayling is located at 62°54′38″N 160°4′2″W (62.910472, -160.067250).

According to the United States Census Bureau, the city has a total area of 10.9 square miles (28 km^{2}), of which, 10.9 square miles (28 km^{2}) of it is land and 0.09% is water.

== Demographics ==
Historical population
Census	Pop.	Note	%±
1970	139		—
1980	209		50.4%
1990	208		−0.5%
2000	194		−6.7%
2010	194		0.0%
2020	210		8.2%
U.S. Decennial Census

Grayling first appeared on the 1970 U.S. Census as a city. It incorporated in 1969.

=== 2020 census ===
As of the 2020 census, Grayling had a population of 210. The median age was 27.0 years. 37.6% of residents were under the age of 18 and 9.5% of residents were 65 years of age or older. For every 100 females there were 118.8 males, and for every 100 females age 18 and over there were 118.3 males age 18 and over.

0.0% of residents lived in urban areas, while 100.0% lived in rural areas.

There were 71 households in Grayling, of which 45.1% had children under the age of 18 living in them. Of all households, 23.9% were married-couple households, 26.8% were households with a male householder and no spouse or partner present, and 29.6% were households with a female householder and no spouse or partner present. About 25.3% of all households were made up of individuals and 8.4% had someone living alone who was 65 years of age or older.

There were 73 housing units, of which 2.7% were vacant. The homeowner vacancy rate was 0.0% and the rental vacancy rate was 0.0%.

Racial composition as of the 2020 census
Race	Number	Percent
White	5	2.4%
Black or African American	0	0.0%
American Indian and Alaska Native	187	89.0%
Asian	0	0.0%
Native Hawaiian and Other Pacific Islander	0	0.0%
Some other race	0	0.0%
Two or more races	18	8.6%
Hispanic or Latino (of any race)	1	0.5%

=== 2000 census ===
As of the census of 2000, there were 194 people, 51 households, and 37 families residing in the city. The population density was 17.7 inhabitants per square mile (6.8/km^{2}). There were 63 housing units at an average density of 5.8 per square mile (2.2/km^{2}). The racial makeup of the city was 7.22% White, 88.14% Native American, 0.52% from other races, and 4.12% from two or more races. 1.03% of the population were Hispanic or Latino of any race.

Of the 51 households, 47.1% had children under the age of 18 living with them, 43.1% were married couples living together, 19.6% had a female householder with no husband present, and 25.5% were non-families. 21.6% of all households were made up of individuals, and 5.9% had someone living alone who was 65 years of age or older. The average household size was 3.80 and the average family size was 4.39.

In the city, the age distribution of the population shows 46.4% under the age of 18, 6.2% from 18 to 24, 22.7% from 25 to 44, 18.6% from 45 to 64, and 6.2% who were 65 years of age or older. The median age was 20 years. For every 100 females, there were 100.0 males. For every 100 females age 18 and over, there were 116.7 males.

The median income for a household in the city was $21,875, and the median income for a family was $18,750. Males had a median income of $21,250 versus $21,250 for females. The per capita income for the city was $7,049. About 62.1% of families and 64.5% of the population were below the poverty line, including 82.9% of those under the age of eighteen and none of those 65 or over.

== Education ==
The Iditarod Area School District operates the David Louis Memorial School in Grayling.
