= Holy Cross, Alaska =

City in Alaska

Holy Cross Deloy Chet (Degexit'an) Ingirraller (Central Yupik) Холи-Кросс (Russian)
- City
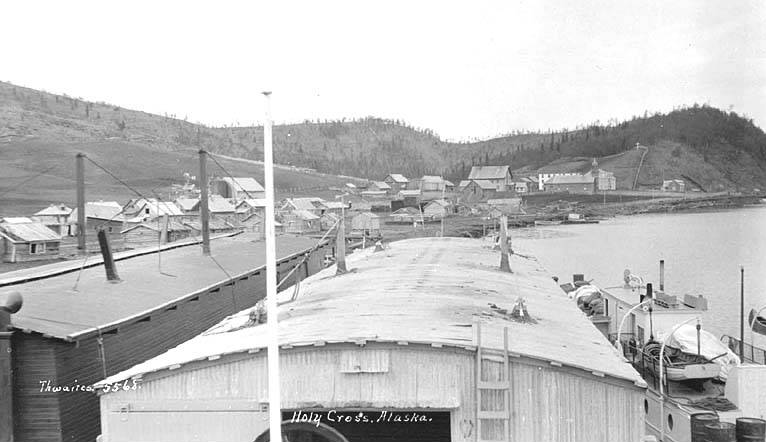
- Holy Cross in 1912

- Location in Alaska
- Coordinates: 62°11′53″N 159°46′24″W
- Country: United States
- State: Alaska
- Census Area: Yukon-Koyukuk
- Incorporated: April 20, 1968

Government
  - Mayor: Sandra Turner
  - State senator: Click Bishop (R)
  - State rep.: Mike Cronk (R)

Area
  - Total: 36.06 sq mi (93.40 km^{2})
  - Land: 28.83 sq mi (74.68 km^{2})
  - Water: 7.23 sq mi (18.72 km^{2})
- Elevation: 135 ft (41 m)

Population (2020)
  - Total: 176
  - Density: 6.1/sq mi (2.36/km^{2})
- Time zone: UTC-9 (Alaska (AKST))
  - Summer (DST): UTC-8 (AKDT)
- ZIP code: 99602
- Area code: 907
- FIPS code: 02-33030
- GNIS feature ID: 1403447

Holy Cross (Degexit'an: Deloy Chet; Central Yupik: Ingirraller) is a city in Yukon-Koyukuk Census Area, Alaska, United States. As of the 2020 census, Holy Cross had a population of 176.

== Geography ==
Holy Cross is located at 62°11′53″N 159°46′24″W (62.198048, -159.773418).

According to the United States Census Bureau, the city has a total area of 37.4 square miles (97 km^{2}), of which, 31.3 square miles (81 km^{2}) of it is land and 6.2 square miles (16 km^{2}) of it (16.51%) is water.

== Demographics ==
Historical population
Census	Pop.	Note	%±
1880	30		—
1890	131		336.7%
1900	135		3.1%
1910	231		71.1%
1930	337		—
1940	226		−32.9%
1950	157		−30.5%
1960	256		63.1%
1970	199		−22.3%
1980	241		21.1%
1990	277		14.9%
2000	227		−18.1%
2010	178		−21.6%
2020	176		−1.1%
2022 (est.)	172	▼	−2.3%
U.S. Decennial Census

Holy Cross first appeared on the 1880 U.S. Census as the unincorporated Inuit village of "Askhomute." In 1890, it was reported as "Kozerevsky." In 1900 and 1910, it was called "Koserefsky." It did not report on the 1920 U.S. Census. In 1930, it was then returned as Holy Cross for the first time. It was formally incorporated in 1968.

=== 2020 census ===
As of the 2020 census, Holy Cross had a population of 176. The median age was 36.5 years. 23.9% of residents were under the age of 18 and 15.9% of residents were 65 years of age or older. For every 100 females there were 131.6 males, and for every 100 females age 18 and over there were 131.0 males age 18 and over.

0.0% of residents lived in urban areas, while 100.0% lived in rural areas.

There were 72 households in Holy Cross, of which 36.1% had children under the age of 18 living in them. Of all households, 23.6% were married-couple households, 29.2% were households with a male householder and no spouse or partner present, and 22.2% were households with a female householder and no spouse or partner present. About 34.7% of all households were made up of individuals and 9.7% had someone living alone who was 65 years of age or older.

There were 87 housing units, of which 17.2% were vacant. The homeowner vacancy rate was 0.0% and the rental vacancy rate was 0.0%.

Racial composition as of the 2020 census
Race	Number	Percent
White	7	4.0%
Black or African American	0	0.0%
American Indian and Alaska Native	142	80.7%
Asian	0	0.0%
Native Hawaiian and Other Pacific Islander	0	0.0%
Some other race	0	0.0%
Two or more races	27	15.3%
Hispanic or Latino (of any race)	2	1.1%

=== 2000 census ===
As of the census of 2000, there were 227 people, 64 households, and 49 families residing in the city. The population density was 7.3 inhabitants per square mile (2.8/km^{2}). There were 81 housing units at an average density of 2.6 per square mile (1.0/km^{2}). The racial makeup of the city was 3.52% White and 96.48% Native American.

Of the 64 households, 43.8% had children under the age of 18 living with them, 46.9% were married couples living together, 15.6% had a female householder with no husband present, and 23.4% were non-families. 17.2% of all households were made up of individuals, and 3.1% had someone living alone who was 65 years of age or older. The average household size was 3.55 and the average family size was 4.00.

In the city, the age distribution of the population shows 38.8% under the age of 18, 7.9% from 18 to 24, 28.6% from 25 to 44, 17.2% from 45 to 64, and 7.5% who were 65 years of age or older. The median age was 27 years. For every 100 females, there were 136.5 males. For every 100 females age 18 and over, there were 127.9 males.

The median income for a household in the city was $21,875, and the median income for a family was $26,250. Males had a median income of $37,813 versus $16,250 for females. The per capita income for the city was $8,542. About 33.3% of families and 45.6% of the population were below the poverty line, including 45.2% of those under the age of eighteen and 47.1% of those 65 or over.

== Education ==
The Iditarod Area School District operates the Holy Cross School in Grayling.
