= Deg Xinag language =

Endangered Athabaskan language of Alaska

Deg Xinag
- Deg Hitʼan
- Native to: United States
- Region: Alaska (lower Yukon River, Anvik River, Innoko River)
- Ethnicity: 280 Deg Hitʼan (2007)
- Native speakers: 2 (2020)
- Language family: Na-Dené: Athabaskan; Northern Athabaskan; Deg Xinag
- Writing system: Latin (Northern Athabaskan alphabet)

Official status
- Official language in: Alaska

Language codes
- ISO 639-3: ing
- Glottolog: dege1248
- ELP: Deg Xinag

Deg Xinag (Deg Hitʼan) is a Northern Athabaskan language spoken by the Deg Xitʼan peoples of the GASH region. The GASH region consists of the villages of Grayling, Anvik, Shageluk, and Holy Cross along the lower Yukon River in Interior Alaska. The language is severely endangered; out of an ethnic population of approximately 250 people, only 2 people still speak the language.

The language was referred to as Ingalik by Osgood (1936). While this term sometimes still appears in the literature, it is today considered pejorative. The word "Ingalik" is from the Yupʼik word Ingqiliq, meaning "Indian".

Engithidong Xugixudhoy (Their Stories of Long Ago), a collection of traditional folk tales in Deg Xinag by the elder Belle Deacon, was published in 1987 by the Alaska Native Language Center. A literacy manual with accompanying audiotapes was published in 1993.

== Dialects ==
There are two main dialects: Yukon and Kuskokwim. The Yukon dialect (Yukon Deg Xinag, Yukon Ingalik) is the traditional language of the villages of the Lower Yukon River (Anvik, Shageluk and Holy Cross). As of 2009, there are no longer any speakers living in Anvik and Holy Cross. The other dialect (Kuskokwim Deg Xinag, Kuskokwim Ingalik) is the traditional language of the settlements of Middle Kuskokwim.

== Phonology ==
=== Consonants ===
Here is the list of consonant sounds in Deg Xinag, including their pronunciation in IPA and their representations in Deg Xinag orthography in brackets:

Consonants in Deg Xinag
		Labial	Dental	Alveolar			Post- alveolar	Retroflex	Palatal	Velar	Uvular	Glottal
		Labial	Dental	plain	sibilant	lateral	Post- alveolar	Retroflex	Palatal	Velar	Uvular	Glottal
Plosive/ Affricate	plain	p ⟨b⟩	tθ ⟨ddh⟩	t ⟨d⟩	ts ⟨dz⟩	tɬ ⟨dl⟩	tʃ ⟨j⟩	ʈʂ ⟨dr⟩		k ⟨g⟩	q ⟨G⟩	ʔ ⟨ʼ⟩
Plosive/ Affricate	aspirated	pʰ ⟨p⟩	tθʰ ⟨tth⟩	tʰ ⟨t⟩	tsʰ ⟨ts⟩	tɬʰ ⟨tł⟩	tʃʰ ⟨ch⟩	ʈʂʰ ⟨tr⟩		kʰ ⟨k⟩	qʰ ⟨q⟩	
Plosive/ Affricate	ejective		tθʼ ⟨tthʼ⟩	tʼ ⟨tʼ⟩	tsʼ ⟨tsʼ⟩	tɬʼ ⟨tłʼ⟩	tʃʼ ⟨chʼ⟩	ʈʂʼ ⟨trʼ⟩		kʼ ⟨kʼ⟩	qʼ ⟨qʼ⟩	
Fricative	voiceless		θ ⟨th⟩		s ⟨s⟩	ɬ ⟨ł⟩	ʃ ⟨sh⟩	ʂ ⟨sr⟩			χ ⟨x⟩	h ⟨h⟩
Fricative	voiced	v ⟨v⟩	ð ⟨dh⟩		z ⟨z⟩			ʐ ⟨zr⟩	ʝ ⟨yh⟩		ʁ ⟨gh⟩	
Sonorant	voiced	m ⟨m⟩		n ⟨n⟩		l ⟨l⟩			j ⟨y⟩	ŋ ⟨ng⟩		
Sonorant	voiceless	m̥ ⟨mh⟩		n̥ ⟨nh⟩						ŋ̊ ⟨ngh⟩		
Sonorant	glottalized	mˀ ⟨m'⟩		nˀ ⟨n'⟩					jˀ ⟨y'⟩	ŋˀ ⟨ng'⟩		

In final position, consonant sounds /t, tθ, ts, tɬ, ʈʂ, tʃ, k, q/ are voiced as [d, dð, dz, dɮ, ɖʐ, dʒ, ɡ, ɢ].

=== Vowels ===
Vowels in Deg Xinag are [a e ə o ʊ].

	Front	Central	Back
Close			ʊ
Close-mid	e		o
Mid		ə	
Open		a	

== Vocabulary ==
- qʼuntʼogh – airplane
- ggagg – animal
- ggagg chux – bear (lit. 'big animal')
- sraqay – children
- dran – day
- xikʼugiłʼanh – doctor, nurse
- łegg – fish
- łek – dog
- sileg – my dog
- vileg – her dog
- tso tlʼogh iy – mammoth
- dinaʼ kʼidz – doll (lit. 'little person')
- xidondiditey – door
- nganʼ ditʼanh – earthquake
- sitoʼ – my father
- vitoʼ – her father
- yix – house
- tinh – snow
- dangan – iron, metal
- deloy – mountain
- vanhgiq – Indian ice cream
- choghlugguy (in Anvik); niq'asrt'ay (in Shageluk) – fox
- vinixiłyiq – in the morning
- Ade' ndadz dengit'a – Hello, how are you?
- giłiq – one
- teqa – two
- togg – three
- denhchʼe – four
- niłqʼosnal giłiggi viqʼidz iy – eleven
