= Innoko River =

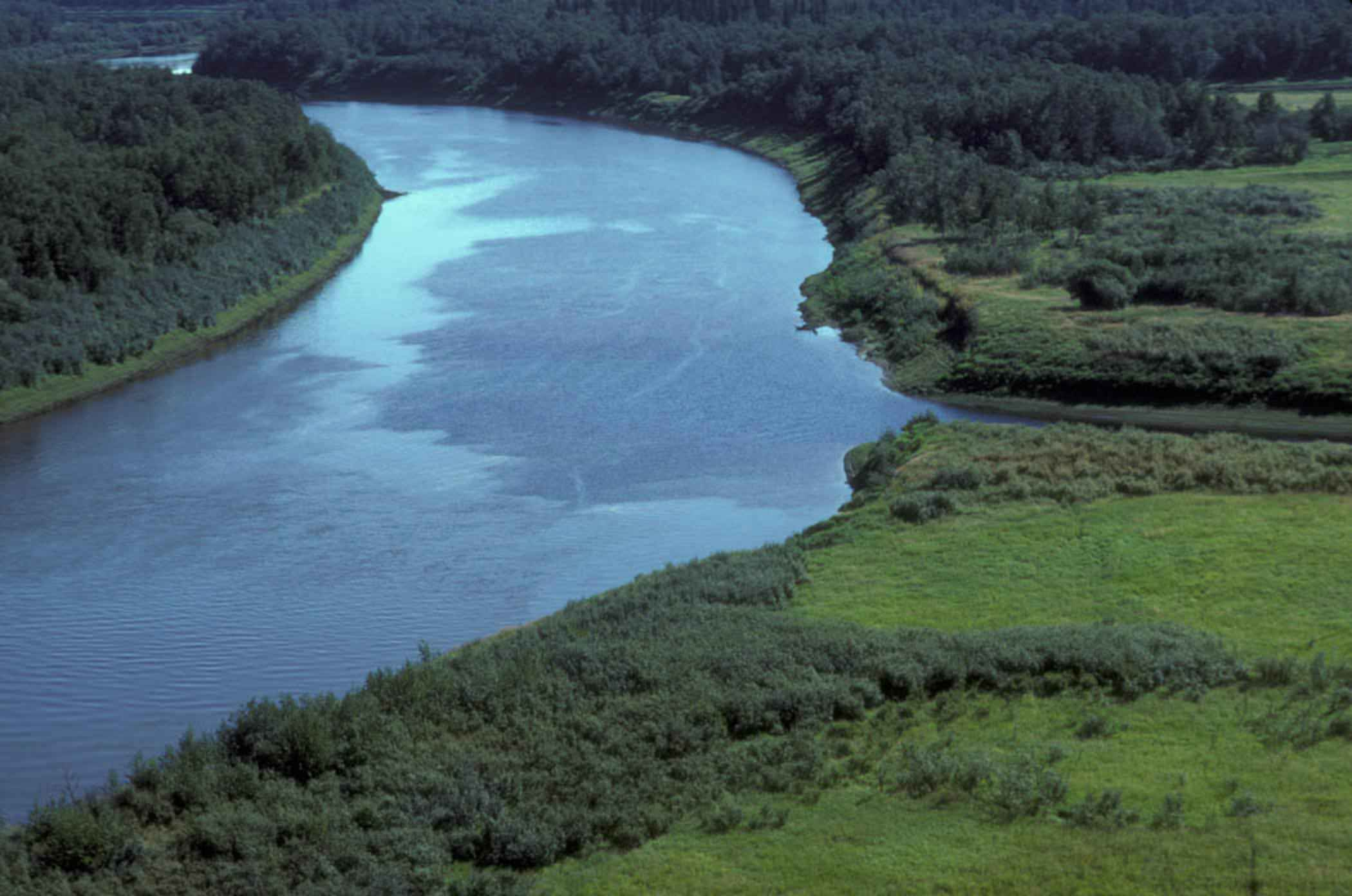
- Innoko River in summer

- Location of the mouth of the Innoko River in Alaska
- Native name: Yooniq (Degexit'an)

Location
- Country: United States
- State: Alaska
- Census Area: Yukon–Koyukuk

Physical characteristics
- Source: south of Cloudy Mountain
  - location: Innoko National Wildlife Refuge
  - coordinates: 63°08′55″N 156°01′30″W
  - elevation: 2,325 ft (709 m)
- Mouth: Yukon River
  - location: 1.5 miles (2.4 km) east of Holy Cross
  - coordinates: 62°11′45″N 159°43′15″W
  - elevation: 26 ft (7.9 m)
- Length: 805 km (500 mi)
- Basin size: 36,517 km^{2} (14,099 mi^{2}) 34,981.3 km^{2} (13,506.4 mi^{2})
- Discharge
  - location: Holy Cross (near mouth)
  - average: 335.467 m^{3}/s (11,846.9 cu ft/s)

The Innoko River (/ɪˈnoʊkoʊ/; Deg Xinag: Yooniq) is a 500-mile (800 km) tributary of the Yukon River in the U.S. state of Alaska. It flows north from its origin south of Cloudy Mountain in the Kuskokwim Mountains and then southwest to meet the larger river across from Holy Cross.

Most of its upper portion flows through the Innoko National Wildlife Refuge. The entire river is within the Yukon–Koyukuk Census Area.

Innoko is a Deg Hit’an name for the river. The Russian colonial administrators also called the river Shiltonotno, Legon or Tlegon, Chagelyuk or Shageluk and Ittege at various times in the 19th century.

== See also ==
- List of rivers of Alaska
