= Upper Kuskokwim people =

Upper Kuskokwim Athabaskans Dichinanek' Hwt'ana
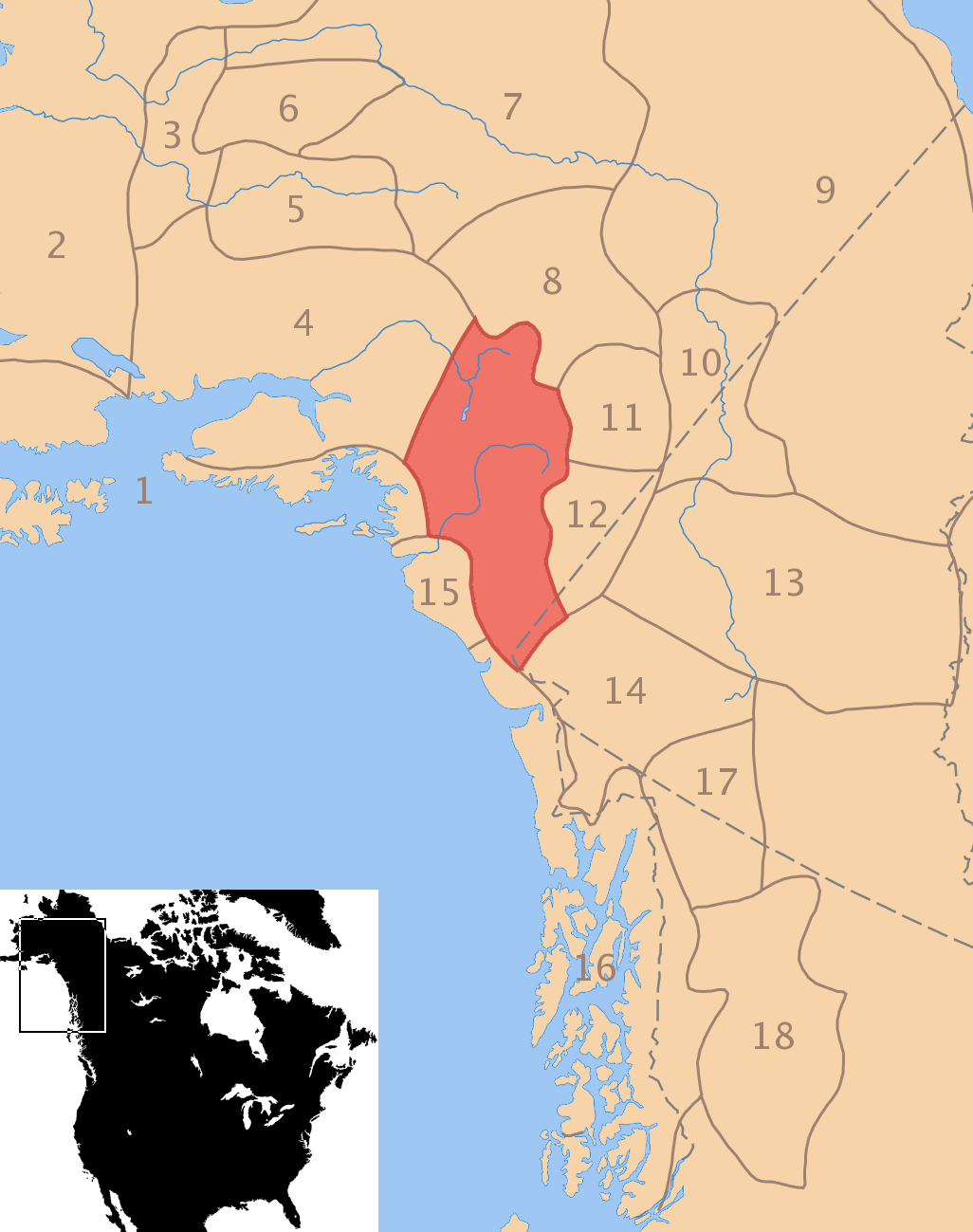
- Nr.5 Upper Kuskokwim homeland

Total population
- 100

Regions with significant populations
- United States (Alaska)

Languages
- Upper Kuskokwim, American Indian English (Alaskan variant)

Religion
- Shamanism (largely ex), Christianity

Related ethnic groups
- Other Alaskan Athabaskans; Especially Tanana Athabaskans

The Upper Kuskokwim people or Upper Kuskokwim Athabaskans, Upper Kuskokwim Athabascans (own native name Dichinanek' Hwt'ana), and historically Kolchan, Goltsan, Tundra Kolosh, and McGrath Ingalik are an Alaskan Athabaskan people of the Athabaskan-speaking ethnolinguistic group. First delineation of this ethnolinguistic group was described by anthropologist Edward Howard Hosley (who has specialized in the study of Alaskan Athabaskan cultures) in 1968, as Kolchan. According to Hosley, "Nevertheless, as a group possessing a history and a culture differing from those of its neighbours, the Kolchan deserve to be recognized as an independent group of Alaskan Athapaskans." They are the original inhabitants of the Upper Kuskokwim River villages of Nikolai, Telida, and McGrath, Alaska. About 25 of a total of 100 Upper Kuskokwim people still speak the language. They speak a distinct Athabaskan language (as Upper Kuskokwim language or Dinak'i) more closely related to Lower Tanana language than to Deg Xinag language (formerly Ingalik), spoken on the middle Kuskokwim. The term used by the Kolchan themselves is Dina'ena (lit. 'the people' as Tenaynah by Hosley), but this is too similar to the adjacent Tanana and Tanaina (today Dena'ina) for introduction into the literature. Nowadays, the term used by the Kolchan themselves is Dichinanek' Hwt'ana (lit. 'Timber River people'). Their neighbors also knew them by this name. In Tanaina they were Kenaniq' ht'an while the Koyukon people to the north referred to them as Dikinanek Hut'ana. The Upper Kuskokwim Athabaskan culture is a hunter-gatherer culture and have a matrilineal system. They were semi-nomadic and lived in semi-permanent settlements.

Their neighbors are other Athabaskan-speaking peoples: Koyukon (north and northeast), Holikachuk (northwest), Deg Hit'an (south and southwest), and Dena'ina (south and southeast).

== Bands and communities ==
From a total of 6 separate band groupings in the upper Kuskokwim River area in late prehistoric times, the Kolchan have coalesced into one community, Nikolai Village.

The Upper Kuskokwim regional bands:

- Telida band — along the McKinley Fork (Swift Fork) which frequently wintered at Telida.
- East Fork band — with winter villages at Slow Fork and Dennis Creek.
- South Fork band — with villages in the Farewell area or at the mouth of the Tonzona (Little Tonzona). The latter village moved twice and became Nikolai village during the contact period.
- Salmon River band — along the Salmon River and the Pitka and Middle Fork of the Kuskokwim.
- Big River band — which used Big River and the Middle Fork with winter villages at Farewell Landing and the mouth of Big River.
- nameless band — which ranged around Vinasale Mountain and had close ties with the former Tatlawiksuk and Takotna River bands.

The Upper Kuskokwim communities:

- McGrath was a seasonal Upper Kuskokwim Athabascan village
- Takotna had a mixed population of Ingalik Athabascans and Yupîk Eskimos
- Nikolai is an Upper Kuskokwim Athabascan village
- Telida is an Upper Kuskokwim Athabascan village

== History ==
The first written account of the early trade and contact was by Lavrenty Alekseyevich Zagoskin, a Russian naval officer, who was given the mission of exploring the Interior of Russian America for the Russian-American Company. In the 1830s the Russians established a series of trading posts within reach of the Upper Kuskokwim people. On the Kuskokwim River the Russian trading posts consisted of Kolmakof Redoubt and a small post at Vinasale. With the U.S. purchase of Alaska in 1867, control of trading stations and the fur trade passed to Americans.

== Hunting-gathering ==
The homeland of the Upper Kuskokwim Athabaskans is a part of Denali National Park and Preserve and located in the Tanana-Kuskokwim Lowlands ecoregion. The Upper Kuskokwim name of Denali mountain is Denaze /diˈnæzi/ (literally 'the tall one').

The Upper Kuskokwim Athabaskans were semi-nomadic hunter-gatherers who moved seasonally throughout the year within a reasonably well-defined territory to harvest fish, bird, mammal, berry and other renewable resources. The people of Nikolai and Telida hunted seasonally in the Alaska Range extensively for many generations, well into the 1900s.

The economy of Upper Kuskokwim Athabaskans is a mixed cash-subsistence system, like other modern foraging economies in Alaska. The subsistence economy is main non-monetary economy system. Cash is often a rare commodity in foraging economies, because of lack of employment opportunities or perceived conflicts in the demands of wage employment and subsistence harvesting activities. Wild resource use in many Athabaskan villages is overwhelmingly for domestic consumption.

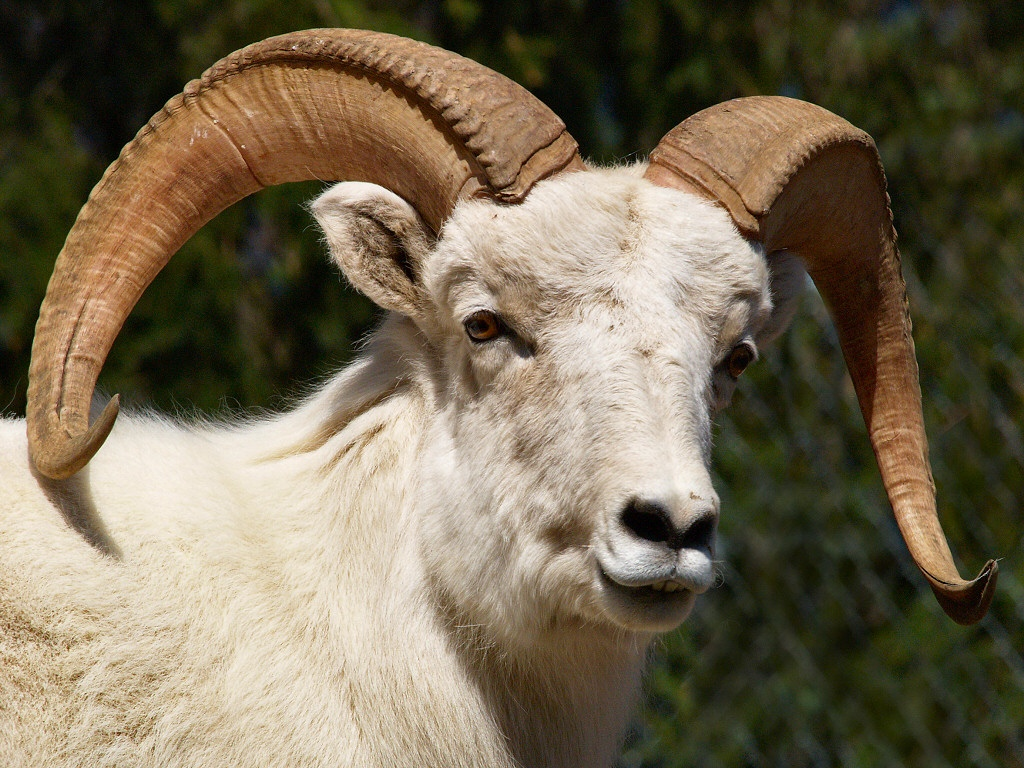
Dall sheep ram at the Alaska Zoo in Anchorage, Alaska

The large animals most harvested were Dall sheep (drodeya, drodiya), caribou (midzish), black bear (shisr) and grizzly bear (tsone, chone). Until the late 1800s and early 1900s moose (dineje) were absent in most of the area. Before moose started to appear in the late 19th century and gradually replaced caribou population in upper Kuskokwim regions, caribou were the main target species for native hunters. Caribou also spend much of the year in the mountains, moving down to the lowlands primarily during the winter. Traditionally, Dall sheep were a favorite meal for people in Upper Kuskokwim region. People used to travel to Alaska Range to hunt them in November. Grizzly and black bears are rarely hunted in Upper Kuskokwim region. A traditional method of winter bear hunting uses dogs to locate dens. Hare or rabbits (gwh) are one a small game species.

Small game species such as upland game birds (ptarmigans and grouse) were a valued source of fresh meat and are widely dispersed but their populations are cyclic and in some years they are very scarce. The spruce grouse (dish), sharp-tailed grouse (ch'iłtwle), ruffed grouse (trok'wda), willow ptarmigan (dilgima) and rock ptarmigan (dziłk'ola) were taken opportunistically throughout the year with bow and arrows or with snares and fence-snare arrangements. Migratory waterfowl (ducks and geese) pass through the area by the thousands in the spring when the headwaters of the rivers first open, but most move on to nest elsewhere. During the fall migration, when there is plenty of open water, most fly over the area without stopping except for a brief rest. Ducks and geese were easily captured when molting. Men in birchbark canoes quietly approached waterfowl in bays and coves and shot them with bow and arrows. Women and children then caught the birds and collected eggs from their nests.

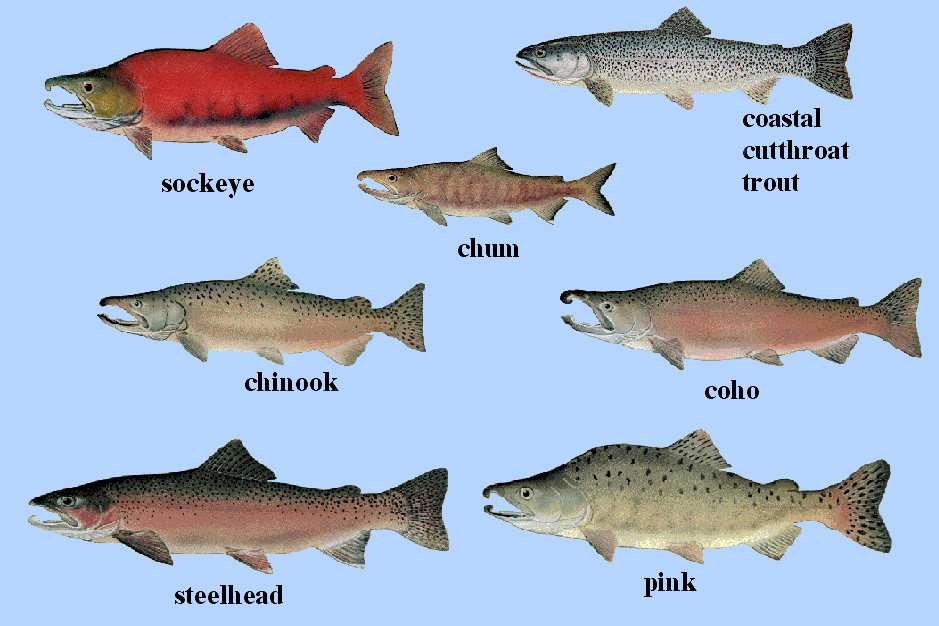
Alaskan economical salmonoid fish species

Fishing (creek and river) was done near the village sites, and the fish were stored in large subsurface caches and is domestic and most common. All band members except the very young children assisted in harvesting and processing the catch. Available fish species include chinook salmon, silver salmon, chum salmon, broad whitefish, humpback whitefish, round whitefish, least cisco, sheefish, grayling, Dolly Varden, burbot (loche), pike, sucker, eel, blackfish, lake trout, and one non-fish species, freshwater mussels. The main economical fish (łuk'a) species are mostly Pacific salmon species. In Upper Kuskokwim region, salmon have been an important food resource as well as in other places in the North. There are five species of Pacific salmon recognized in Alaska, but only three of them (king or chinook, dog or chum and silver or coho) regularly venture up to the Upper Kuskokwim region. Currently, king or chinook (gas) salmon occupies the majority of the harvest of salmonids in this region, followed by dog or chum (srughat'aye) and silver or coho (nosdlaghe) salmon. Whereas hundreds of thousands, and even millions, of salmon enter the Kuskokwim River, by the time they reach the headwaters only a few thousand or even a few hundred are left to spawn in any given stream. In the Upper Kuskokwim Athabascan language, August is nosdlagheno'o (lit. 'coho salmon month').

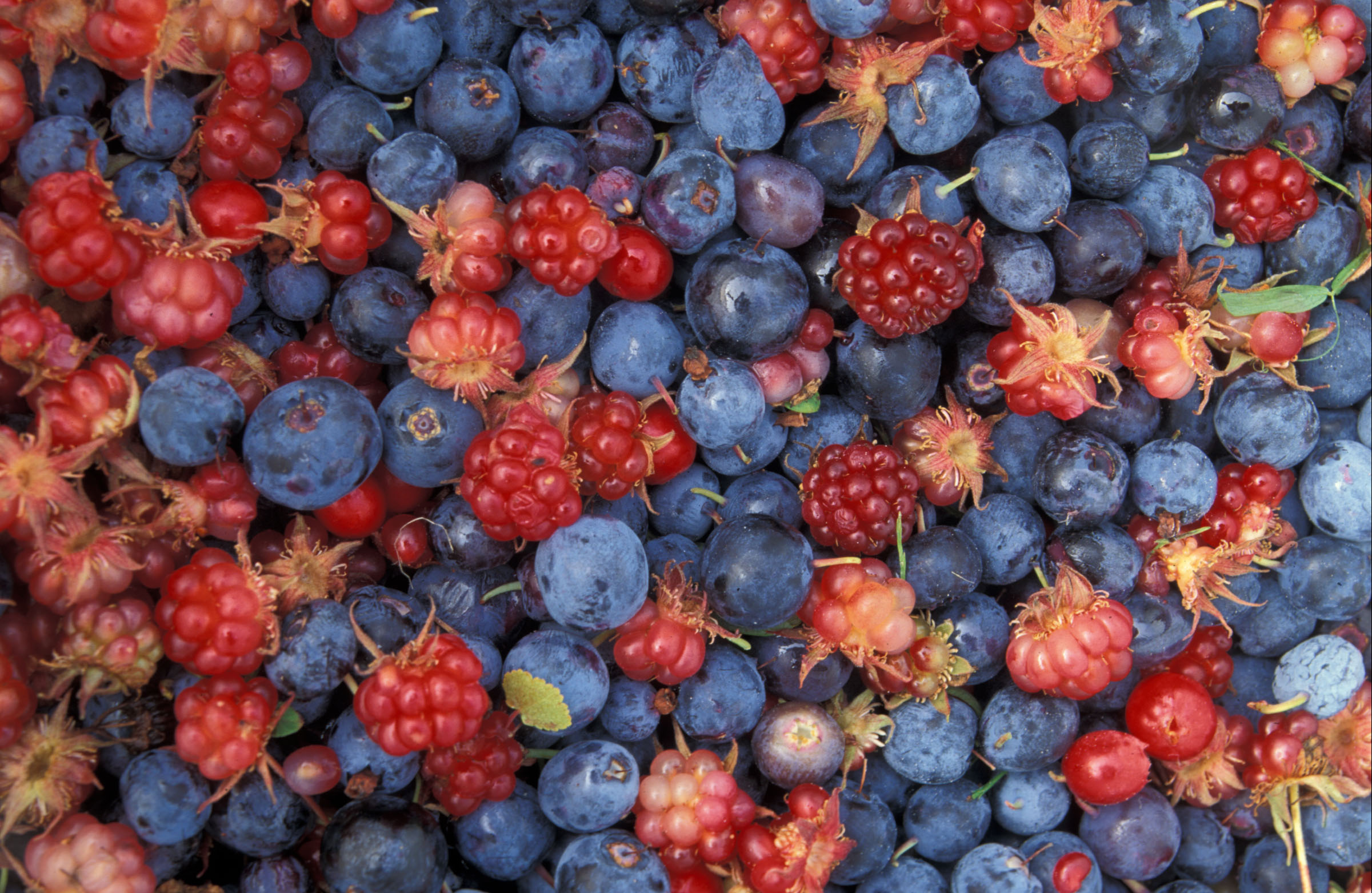
Alaska wild berries from the Innoko National Wildlife Refuge, a mixture of true berries (blue Vaccinium uliginosum and red Vaccinium vitis-idaea) and aggregate fruits (red Rubus arcticus)

Whitefish, northern pike, Arctic grayling, inconnu (sheefish), suckers, burbot (lingcod, lush) and a few resident Dolly Varden trout are present but these are also widely dispersed and not present in every stream. According to the people in the Upper Kuskokwim region, Dolly Varden trout (hoch'ilmoya) used to be much more common in the past, spawning in the area where salmon also spawn. However, it seems that their number has decreased recently. The round whitefish (hwstin'), lake whitefish or broad whitefish (tilaya, taghye), and humpback whitefish (sajila) are the most abundant group of fish north of the Alaska Range, inhabiting almost every type of river and freshwater habitat in this section of Alaska. Northern pike (ch'ighilduda, ch'ulkoy) are harvested by people of Upper Kuskokwim region in summer, fall and during freeze-up. In Upper Kuskokwim region, Arctic grayling (ts'idat'ana) are harvested in summer, fall and early winter, using rod and reel gear or nets. Sheefish (zidlaghe) are harvested in the Upper Kuskokwim drainage mainly in summer months between June and August and less frequently in September and October. Burbot or lingcod (ts’onya) used to be harvested with nets in Upper Kuskokwim region. Traditionally, people set up a fish trap made out of spruce to catch Alaska blackfish (hozrighe, tułnuna) beneath the ice in winter. Other fish species include the longnose sucker (donts'oda).

Beginning in late spring and continuing throughout the summer and early fall months, both adults and children gathered a variety of plants and vegetative materials. Fruit and berries such as blueberries (jija), salmonberries (tujija'), lowbush cranberries (netl'), highbush cranberries (tsaltsa, tsoltso), raspberries (dwhnikotl'), crowberries (dziłnołt'asr), kinnikinnick berries (dinish), timberberries, and wild rose hips (nichush, nitsush), edible roots such as Hedysarum alpinum (Indian potato, Alaska carrot or wild carrot, tsosr), and assorted plants were eaten fresh, preserved for later consumption, or used for medicinal purposes.

== Kinship ==
The Upper Kuskokwim kinship is based on what is formally known as an Iroquois kinship and reflects the matrilineal clan system and the importance of cross cousin marriage. The Upper Kuskokwim social system characterized by unilineal descent and a division into three named, matrilineal, common descent or clan-like groups. These groups were: St'chelayu (lit. 'fish people'), Tonay'tlil'tsitnah (lit. 'middle kind' or 'people in the middle'), and Medzisht'hut'anah (lit. 'caribou people').

== Culture ==
=== Religion ===
==== Animism and shamanism ====
Historically and traditionally, Upper Kuskokwim and other all Alaskan Athabaskans have practiced animism and shamanism.

==== Christianity ====
The Upper Kuskokwim people are today strongly Russian Orthodox in faith, the result of missionary influence from the lower Kuskokwim and Yukon rivers beginning in the mid-nineteenth century. Churches were built in Nikolai and Telida in the early 1900s.

=== Cuisine ===
The Alaskan Athabaskan Indian ice cream (nemaje) is dessert-like berries, Indian potato, and fish (whitefish, sheefish) mixed with fat (commonly Crisco now, but bear fat is occasionally used) and different from the Canadian Indian ice cream of First Nations in British Columbia.

== Modern tribal unions ==
=== Tribal entities ===
Alaska Native tribal entities for Upper Kuskokwim Athabaskans are recognized by the United States Bureau of Indian Affairs:

Tribal entities	Location (native name)
McGrath Native Village	McGrath (Tochak')
Nikolai Village	Nikolai (Nikolai)
Takotna Village	Takotna (Tochotno')
Telida Village	Telida (Tilaydi)

=== ANCSA ===
The Alaska Native Regional Corporations of Upper Kuskokwim Athabaskans were established in 1971 when the United States Congress passed the Alaska Native Claims Settlement Act (ANCSA).

Native Village Corporation	Community	Alaska Native Reg. Corp.
Medfra Native Council Inc.	Medfra	Doyon, Limited
MTNT Limited	McGrath	Doyon, Limited
MTNT Limited	Nikolai	Doyon, Limited
MTNT Limited	Takotna	Doyon, Limited
MTNT Limited	Telida	Doyon, Limited

=== Tanana Chiefs Conference ===
The Tanana Chiefs Conference is a traditional tribal consortium of the all Central Alaskan Athabaskans, with the exception of the Southern Alaskan Athabaskans Dena'ina and Ahtna).

- Upper Kuskokwim Subregion
  - McGrath Traditional Council, McGrath, members are Upper Kuskokwim Athabaskans
  - Medfra Traditional Council, Medfra, members are Upper Kuskokwim Athabaskans
  - Edzeno Native Council, Nikolai, members are Upper Kuskokwim Athabaskans
  - Takotna Traditional Council, Takotna, members are Upper Kuskokwim Athabaskans and Central Alaskan Yup'ik people
  - Telida Native Village Council, Telida, members are Upper Kuskokwim Athabaskans
