= Takotna Airport =

- IATA: TCT; ICAO: PPCT; FAA LID: TCT

Summary
- Airport type: Public
- Owner: State of Alaska DOT&PF - Central Region
- Serves: Takotna, Alaska
- Elevation AMSL: 422 ft / 129 m
- Coordinates: 62°59′37″N 156°01′41″W

Map
- Location of airport in Alaska

Runways
| Direction | Length | | Surface |
| Direction | ft | m | Surface |
|---|---|---|---|
| 4/22 | 4,000 | 1,219 | Gravel |
- Source: Federal Aviation Administration

Takotna Airport (IATA: TCT, FAA LID: TCT) is a state-owned public-use airport located one nautical mile (2 km) north of Takotna, in the Yukon-Koyukuk Census Area of the U.S. state of Alaska.

As per the Federal Aviation Administration, this airport had 206 passenger boardings (enplanements) in calendar year 2008, 128 in 2009, and 190 in 2010. The National Plan of Integrated Airport Systems for 2011–2015 categorized it as a general aviation facility.

== Facilities ==
Takotna Airport covers an area of 7 acres (3 ha) at an elevation of 422 feet (129 m) above mean sea level. It has one runway designated 4/22 with a gravel surface measuring 4,000 by 75 feet (1,219 x 23 m).

== Airlines and destinations ==
| Airlines | Destinations |
|---|---|
| Tanana Air Service | McGrath |

== Statistics ==
Carrier shares: January – December 2013
| Carrier | Passengers (arriving and departing) |
|---|---|
| Tanana Air Service | 90(100%) |

Top domestic destinations: Jan. – Dec. 2013
| Rank | Destination | Airport | Passengers | |
| Rank | Destination | Airport | 2013 | 2012 |
|---|---|---|---|---|
| 1 | McGrath, AK | McGrath Airport (MCG) | 60 | 40 |
| 2 | Nikolai, AK | Nikolai Airport (NIB) | <10 | <10 |

== See also ==
- List of airports in Alaska
