= Telida, Alaska =

Unincorporated community in the state of Alaska, United States

Telida
- Unincorporated community village
- Tilaya-di, Tilayadi’
- Location within the state of Alaska
- Coordinates: 63°38′N 153°28′W
- Country: United States
- State: Alaska
- Census area: Yukon-Koyukuk

Government
  - State senator: Lyman Hoffman (D)
  - State rep.: Bryce Edgmon (D)
- Elevation: 617 ft (188 m)

Population (2010)
  - Total: 3
- Time zone: UTC-9 (Alaska (AKST))
  - Summer (DST): UTC-8 (AKDT)
- FIPS code: 02-75800
- GNIS ID: 1410727

Telida (Tilaya-di or Tilayadi’ in Upper Kuskokwim) is an unincorporated community located in the Yukon-Koyukuk Census Area in the U.S. state of Alaska. At the 2010 census the population was 3, unchanged from 2000.

== Geography ==
Telida is located at 63.3832623N, 153.2803835W, on the south side of the Swift Fork (McKinley Fork) of the Kuskokwim River, about 40 km (25 mi) by air northeast of McGrath.

The word Telida means 'whitefish' in the Upper Kuskokwim Athabaskan language.

== History ==
Athabascan folklore says that Telida's residents are descended from two sisters, survivors of an attack by another Athabascan group, who fled from the McKinley area to Telida Lake where they discovered whitefish at its outlet. The women were later discovered by stragglers from the attacking party, who married the women and settled at the lake. The village of Telida is named after the lake.

The village has been located in three different places. The first village was located about 2 km (1.2 mi) upstream from present-day Telida. It was first visited by United States army explorers in 1899. When the Swift Fork changed course, the village was moved what is now called "Old Telida." In 1916, some residents moved to the present day site, "New Telida," about 7 km (4.3 mi) downstream from Old Telida. A Russian Orthodox church, St. Basil the Great, was built in Old Telida in 1918. A roadhouse was also built during this period. In 1920-21, Old Telida was a stopping point on the trail between McGrath and Nenana and hundreds of people used the roadhouse. In 1935, Old Telida flooded and the remaining residents relocated to New Telida.

In 1958, a fire burned an area in which the villagers constructed an airstrip. Many families moved to Takotna during the school year and lived in Telida only during summer months. A school was built in Telida in the 1970s, but the population has declined to almost nothing since.

== Demographics ==
Historical population
Census	Pop.	Note	%±
1980	33		—
1990	11		−66.7%
2000	3		−72.7%
2010	3		0.0%
U.S. Decennial Census

Telida first appeared on the 1980 U.S. Census as a census-designated place (CDP). In 1990, it lost that designation and was reclassified as an unincorporated Alaskan Native Village Statistical Area (ANVSA).

== Transportation ==
Telida Airport (IATA: TLF, FAA: 2K5) is a public use airport serving Telida.

== Education ==
It was previously served by the Telida School of the Iditarod Area School District.

The Telida Current began publication after the school received a copy machine. It was later published using the Quill, software for literacy
