= McGrath Airport =

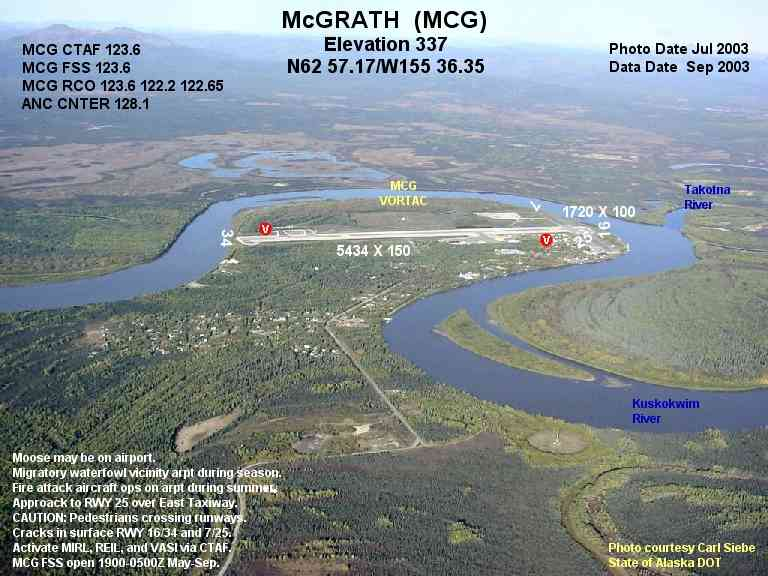
- IATA: MCG; ICAO: PAMC; FAA LID: MCG

Summary
- Airport type: Public
- Owner: State of Alaska DOT&PF - Central Region
- Serves: McGrath, Alaska
- Elevation AMSL: 341 ft / 104 m
- Coordinates: 62°57′10″N 155°36′25″W

Map
- Location of airport in Alaska

Runways
| Direction | Length | | Surface |
| Direction | ft | m | Surface |
|---|---|---|---|
| 16/34 | 5,936 | 1,809 | Asphalt |
| 5/23 | 2,000 | 610 | Gravel |

Statistics (2012)
- Aircraft operations: 11,000
- Based aircraft: 10
- Source: Federal Aviation Administration

McGrath Airport (IATA: MCG, ICAO: PAMC, FAA LID: MCG) is a state-owned public-use airport serving McGrath, a city in the Yukon-Koyukuk Census Area of the U.S. state of Alaska.

Formerly, the facility operated as McGrath Army Airbase.

As per the Federal Aviation Administration, the airport had 5,278 passenger boardings (enplanements) in calendar year 2008, 4,893 in 2009, and 5,242 in 2010. The National Plan of Integrated Airport Systems for 2011–2015 categorized it as a non-primary commercial service airport.

== Facilities and aircraft ==
The facility covers an area of 641 acres (259 ha) at an elevation of 341 feet (104 m) above mean sea level. It has two runways: 16/34 is 5,936 by 100 feet (1,809 x 30 m) with an asphalt surface and 5/23 is 2,000 by 60 feet (610 x 18 m) with a gravel surface.

For the 12-month period ending July 31, 2012, the airport had 11,000 aircraft operations, an average of 30 per day: 82% air taxi and 18% general aviation. At that time there were 10 aircraft based at this airport, all single-engine.

== Airline and destinations ==
Airlines offering scheduled passenger service:

| Airlines | Destinations |
|---|---|
| Alaska Air Transit | Anchorage–Merrill |
| Tanana Air Service | Nikolai, Takotna |

=== Statistics ===
Carrier shares: January – December 2013
| Carrier | Passengers (arriving and departing) |
|---|---|
| Peninsula | 4,940(96.22%) |
| Tanana | 190(3.60%) |
| Hageland | 10(0.18%) |

Top domestic destinations: Jan. – Dec. 2013
| Rank | Destination | Airport | Passengers | |
| Rank | Destination | Airport | 2013 | 2012 |
|---|---|---|---|---|
| 1 | Anchorage, AK | Ted Stevens Anchorage International (ANC) | 2,440 | 3,210 |
| 2 | Nikolai, AK | Nikolai Airport (NIB) | 40 | 40 |
| 3 | Takotna, AK | Takotna Airport (TCT) | 30 | 20 |
| 4 | Unalakleet, AK | Unalakleet Airport (UNK) | 20 | 10 |
| 5 | Tatalina, AK | Tatalina Airport (TLJ) | <10 | 10 |
| 6 | Anvik, AK | Anvik Airport (ANV) | <10 | <10 |
| 7 | Ophir, AK | Ophir Airport (OPH) | <10 | <10 |
| 8 | St. Mary's, AK | St. Mary's Airport (KSM) | <10 | <10 |

== Incidents ==
- On July 3, 1970, Douglas C-47 N154R of Reeder Flying Service crashed on take-off on a domestic passenger flight to Galena Airport, Alaska. Seven of the 27 people on board were killed.

== See also ==
- List of airports in Alaska
