= Kuskokwim Mountains =

Mountain range in Alaska, U.S.

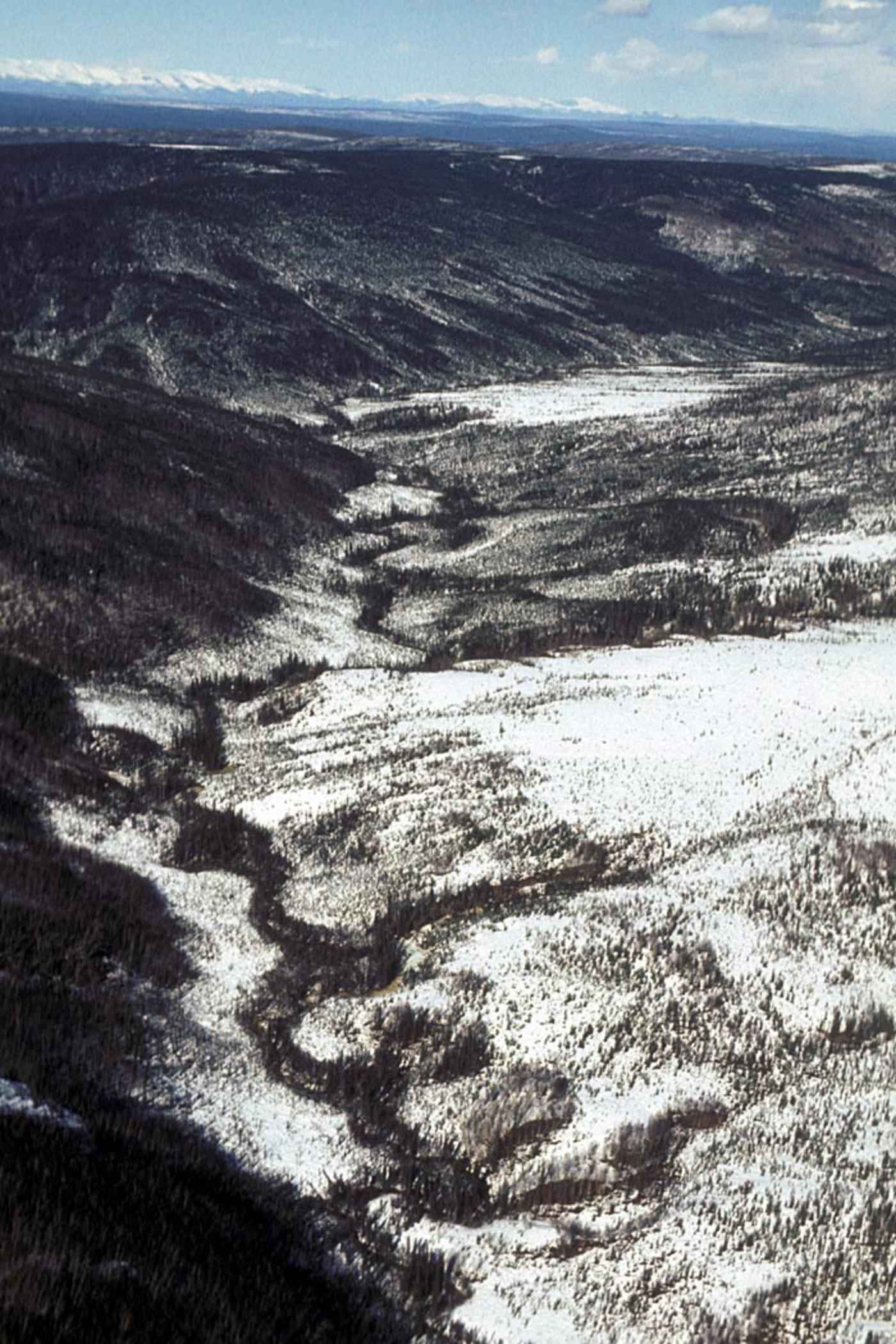
- Nowitna River in Kuskokwim Mountains.

Highest point
- Peak: Dillingham High Point
- Elevation: 5,250 ft (1,600 m)
- Coordinates: 60°06′57″N 159°19′27″W

Geography
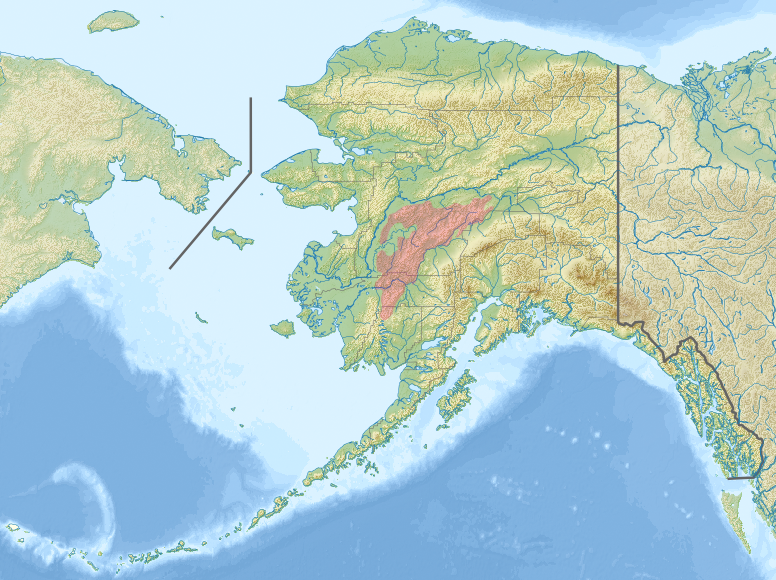
- Country: United States
- State: Alaska
- Range coordinates: 63°00′00″N 156°30′00″W
- Borders on: Pacific Coast Ranges

The Kuskokwim Mountains is a range of mountains in the Yukon-Koyukuk Census Area, Alaska, United States, west of the Alaska Range and southeast of the Yukon River. The Kuskokwim Mountains begin in the interior west of Fairbanks. The mountain range extends from Canyon Creek and Chikuminuk Lake in the southwest over a distance of about 400 km (250 mi) long to the Tanana River in the northeast and reach a width of up to 80 km (50 mi).

The southeast flank of the Kuskokwim Mountains borders the rivers Kantishna, Kuskokwim, Holitna and Kogrukluk. In the northwest lie the Kaiyuh, Russian and Kilbuck Mountains as well as the rivers Innoko, Dishna and Iditarod.

The range takes its name from the Kuskokwim River, which flows through the mountains, as well as Aniak and Nowitna rivers.

Reported and defined in 1898 by Josiah Edward Spurr of the USGS. Spurr applied the name "Tanana Hills" to the low mountains at the northeast end of what are now the Kuskokwim Mountains.

== Sub-ranges ==
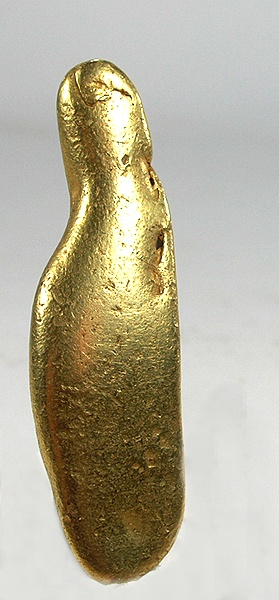
Water-worn gold nugget from the Kuskokwim Mountains. Weight: 2.16 troy ounces / 67 grams.

- Ahklun Mountains
- Eek Mountains
- Wood River Mountains
- Russian Mountains
- Kilbuck Mountains
