= 2K5 =

2K5 may refer to:

- the year 2005
- the FAA location identifier for Telida Airport, American airport in Alaska
- the GRAU designation for the BM-25 Soviet multiple rocket launcher
- ESPN College Hoops 2K5, 2004 video game
- ESPN NBA 2K5, 2004 video game
- ESPN NFL 2K5, 2004 video game
- ESPN NHL 2K5, 2004 video game
- Major League Baseball 2K5, 2005 video game
- Shake, Rattle & Roll 2k5, 2005 film
