= IASD =

IASD may refer to:

- International Association for the Study of Dreams
- Inter-Allied Services Department of the Services Reconnaissance Department
- Iditarod Area School District
