= Aniak =

Aniak may refer to:

- Aniak, Alaska, a city in the Bethel Census Area
- Aniak River, located in Alaska
- Aniak (crater), a small crater on Mars
