= Russian Mountains (disambiguation) =

Russian Mountains may refer to:

- Roller coasters, whose earlier forms were known as the "Russian Mountains".
- Russian Mountains, a subrange of the Salmon Mountains in the Russian Wilderness, California, U.S.
- Russian Mountains (Alaska), a mountain range in Alaska, U.S.
- List of mountains and hills of Russia
