= Florence Robinson Weber =

American geologist and pilot (1921–2018)

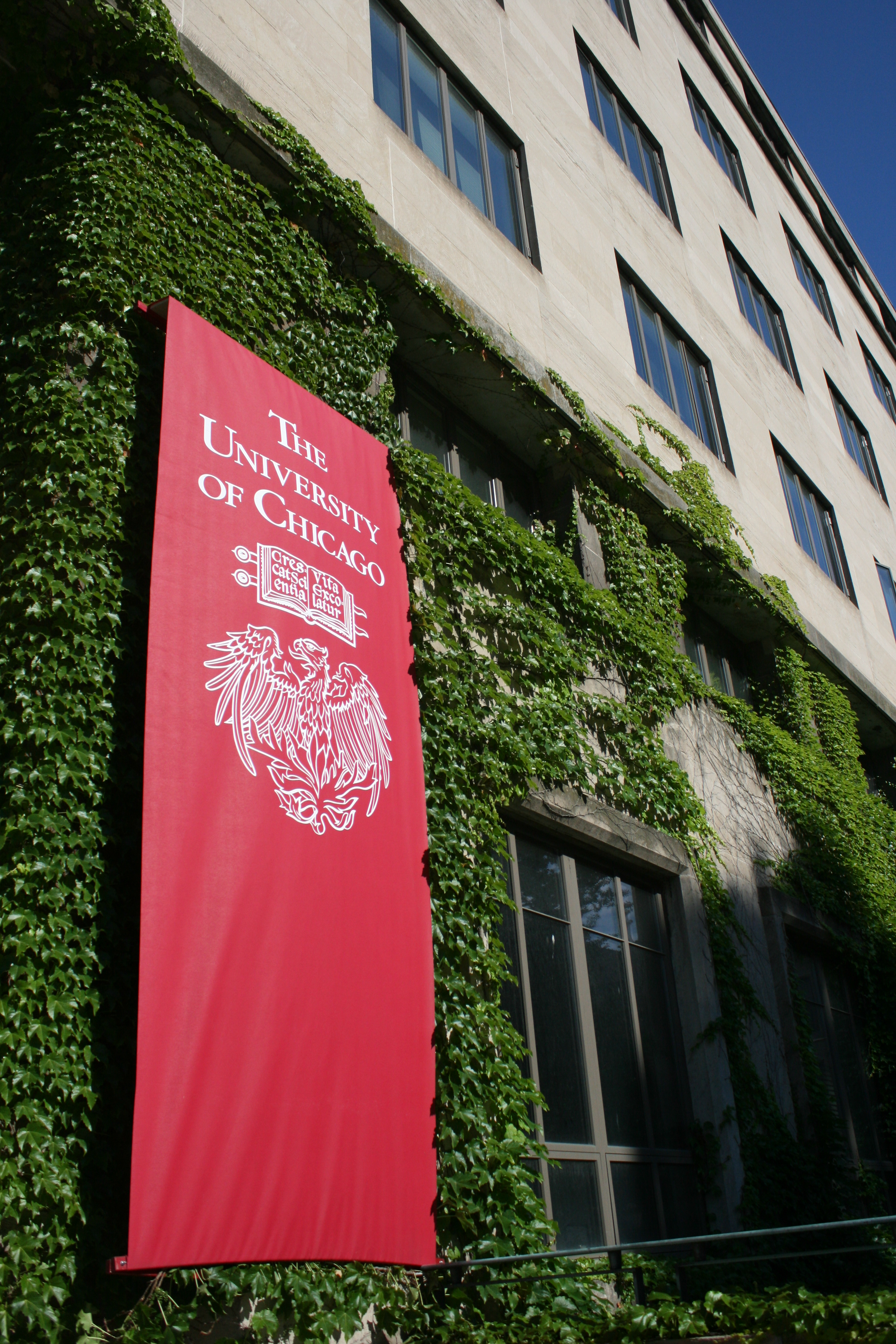
Florence Robinson Weber attended the University of Chicago. She obtained an Undergraduate degree in geology in 1943. Afterwards, she went back to University of Chicago and obtained a master's degree in geology in 1948.

Florence Robinson Weber (August 26, 1921 – January 18, 2018) was an American geologist, pilot, and adventurer, and worked to contribute to Alaskan geology. Weber co-authored the first geologic map of the Fairbanks Quadrangle, and the Preliminary engineering geologic maps of the Trans-Alaska pipeline route in 1971. She worked for the United States Geologic Survey for much of her professional career and is often referenced in many geologic reports on the Tanana-Yukon area.

== Early life ==
Weber was born in Milwaukee, Wisconsin, the only child of a couple who originated from England and Germany. In school Florence met lifelong friend, Florence (Rucker) Collins, who accompanied her on every adventure, including getting their pilots' and automobile licenses and heading to Alaska together in 1948.

Weber graduated from high school and attended the University of Chicago (UC) where she graduated with an undergraduate degree in geology in 1943. After graduating Weber started a temporary job with Shell Oil in Houston. It was during this time that Weber decided to pursue obtaining a pilot's license after being inspired by an exhibit of US warplanes. After the war, she returned to continue her studies at UC and graduated with a master's degree in geology in 1948. Shortly after graduating, she secured a position in Alaska with the Naval Oil Unit of the US Geological Survey. Florence explored Alaska thoroughly, taking part in multiple long river trips in the Arctic, and using her pilot's license to observe Alaska from bird's eye view.

== Career ==
Weber spent much of her early career in Alaska studying the structure and stratigraphy of the test wells in the Naval Petroleum Reserve No. 4 (NPR-4). The NPR-4 consisted of mostly oil and petroleum reserves and was established in 1923 by the United States federal government as a way to secure fuel in the event of war. Weber then accepted a temporary job for Shell Oil in Houston prior to accepting a job with the US Geological Survey in 1949, which was posted in Alaska. Weber continued to work in Alaska until 1954 when the Survey moved their office to Washington D.C. Florence proceeded to work in the office, writing reports for 2 years. In order to return to fieldwork, she made use of her Pilots license and offered the Survey a special service of access to the interior of Alaska via seaplane.

Upon Weber's return to Alaska in 1956 she proceeded to land her seaplane on many undiscovered lakes subsequently naming many of her discoveries. Weber was featured in a National Geographic article in 1957, in which she was one of six women and one man who travelled down the Yukon River from Whitehorse to Eagle by Folboat.

Florence had obtained excellent skills as a HAM radio operator (her call sign KL7AZ). In the 1950s she developed a radio pal communication with Al Weber (his call sign KL7AG), who lived in Anchorage. This direct line of communication became more than just a radio connection. She became a member of the Geological Society of America in 1950 and was elected a Fellow in 1967.

Florence was a co-author to preliminary geologic maps of the Livengood quadrangle that was published in 1971. She also published with Troy Pé a series of maps of the Fairbanks area in 1976. In 1986, she became a project leader for the Alaska Mineral Resource Assessment Program (AMRAP) in the Livengood area. Her contributions led to recognition that glaciers that were originating offshore had a significant role on the Alaska Peninsula. She continued to work on the Alaska Peninsula, with her guidance and assistance a geologic map was that incorporated mapping of the glacial deposits of Cold Bay and False Pass quadrangle was produced. This had a major impact on the way the stream-sediment geochemistry was interpreted and the assessment of associated resources.

== Retirement and death ==
Florence continued to contribute Alaska geology as much as she possible can until her retirement. She won many awards and had over 100 publications on Alaska geology in her long lasting career. After her retirement, as long as she and her husband were physically capable, they led an active lifestyle that included, but was not limited to, skiing, canoeing, kayaking, and traveling the world. Weber spent the last nine years of her life in the Pioneer's home where she died on January 18, 2018, at the age of 96.

== Awards and honors ==
- Weber joined the Geological Society of America in 1950
  - Elected a fellow of the society in 1967
- 1987 - Honorary Doctor of Science (University of Alaska Fairbanks)
- Mid- 1990's - U.S. Department of the Interior Meritorious Service Award
- 2009 - Alaska Geological Society (AGS) Honorary Membership And Distinguished Service Award

== Selected publications ==
The following are some of Weber's most important papers.

- Cady, J., & Weber, F. (1983). Aeromagnetic map and interpretation of magnetic and gravity data, Circle Quadrangle, Alaska [Abstract]. Open-File Report. doi:10.3133/ofr83170c
- Péwé, T. L., Wahraftig, C., & Weber, F. R. (1966). Geologic map of the Fairbanks quadrangle, Alaska (No. 455).
- Weber, F. R., & Geological Survey (U.S.). (1988). Geology and mineral resources of the White Mountains National Recreation Area, East-central Alaska. Denver, Colo.?: Dept. of the Interior, U.S. Geological Survey.
- Geological Survey (U.S.), Weber, F. R., & Péwé, T. L. (1970). Surficial and engineering geology of the central part of the Yukon-Koyukuk lowland, Alaska. Washington, D.C: U.S. Geological Survey.
- Weber, F. R., American Association of Petroleum Geologists., Society of Economic Paleontologists and Mineralogists., Society of Exploration Geophysicists., & Alaska Geological Society. (1985). Geologic guide to the Fairbanks-Livengood area, East-central Alaska. Anchorage: Alaska Geological Society.
- Newberry, Rainer & Bundtzen, T.K. & Mortensen, James & Weber, F.R.. (1998). Petrology, geochemistry, age, and significance of two foliated intrusions in the Fairbanks District, Alaska. US Geological Survey Professional Paper. 117–129.
- Weber, F. R., Blodgett, R. B., Harris, A. G., & Dutro Jr, J. T. (1994). "Paleontology of the Livengood quadrangle, Alaska." US Geological Survey Open-File Report, 94, 1-24.
- Campbell, D. L., Fisher, M., Fuis, G. S., Weber, F. R., Stone, D. B., & Mull, G. (1989). Alaskan Geological and Geophysical Transect.
