= Florence Rucker Collins =

American aviator

Florence Rucker Collins (May 1921 – November 4, 2015) was an American aviator, geologist, researcher and conservationist.

Florence was one of the major founders of the Northern Alaska Environmental Center (NAEC), she also chaired the Subsistence Resource Commission (SRC) for over 2 decades; leading them to promote harmony between the users and the preservation of the Denali National Park. Collins was also honored by the National Park Service for her work.

Collins died aged 94.

== Early life ==
Florence Rucker Collins, (nee Florence Parks Rucker) was born in May 1921 in New Haven, Connecticut as the only child to Florence Harriet Dickey and Benjamin Parks Rucker. Her family resided in Brooklyn until the age of 6. She graduated high school in Atlanta, Georgia in 1939. Collins was obligated to defer her acceptance to the University of Chicago after she fell ill before the fall term. Undeterred, Collins read textbooks on first-year courses on Geology in order to start her university career as a sophomore instead. She successfully completed comprehension exams on all her subjects, allowing her entry to the geology program. Collins became close friends with Florence Robinson, another undergraduate in her program. Over extended summer school trips both women developed a love for traveling. Shortly after graduation in June 1943, Collins and Robinson started working at Shell Oil Company in Houston, Texas. However, the pair disliked Texas’ climate and topography and started to formulate an alternative plan. They decided they would spend the next four years working and saving money to travel for the following two summers and spending the winters studying for their master’s degrees. In 1945 this plan changed as the two became fascinated in the idea of becoming aircraft pilots after visiting a WWII fighter aircraft exhibit. They returned to the University of Chicago for graduate school after resigning from Shell in 1947, and received their Masters in Geology in 1949.

Shortly after, they found employment with the United States Geological Survey (USGS) in Fairbanks, Alaska. After the project, both were transferred to the USGS office in Washington, D.C. Collins was envious of the in-field experience that her male counterparts were receiving so she decided to buy a SuperCub with Florence Robinson and tour Alaska themselves. In 1956 the girls purchased a SuperCub with floats so they could truly see the entirety of Alaska. During Collins' time in Alaska, she published many of her own works for the U.S. government's geology research. Along with her own works, Collins began her soon-to-be two-decade-long chair position with the Denali’s SRC (Subsistence Resource Commission). Collins and Robinsons soon bought a shoreline property on Lake Minchumina and made the choice that Alaska was going to be home.

== Family ==
Florence Collins purchased a part-interest property on the shore of Lake Minchumina. Here, she met Richard (Dick) Collins and his wife Leanne. She married Dick on April 13, 1957, in Christiansburg, Virginia. Shortly after, the couple had their first son Ray Rucker Collins, born May 2, 1958, and twin girls Julie Hubbard Collins and Florence (Miki) Dickey Collins, born September 22, 1959.

At this time Dick was working as a pilot at Civil Aeronautics Administration (CAA). The two lived in a cabin there where they home-schooled their children. Their lifestyle included traveling by dog-sled, hunting for fish and meat, as well as collecting berries. She also worked to understand the local geological history better, and would later publish an article in 1985 about the vegetated sand dunes in the area.

== Career and Research ==
After graduating from the University of Chicago, Collins and Robinson began working for the United States Geological Survey which brought them to Fairbanks, Florence began her research, with her partner and friend Florence Robinson, by microscopically studying rock formations brought from nearby oil fields. After purchasing some property at Lake Minchumina, Florence and her partner were moved to Washington, D.C., requested by the USGS. After spending some time in Washington, they received a grant to study in Alaska. Upon return to Alaska, the two studied prehistoric sand dunes and while doing so they named multiple lakes, some of which are Dune lake, Totek and Big Spectacle lake. Collins then had to take some time away from her research as she began a family. Once her family was old enough she began working as a liaison for Denali park, where she was then voted president and remained in that position for two decades.

Between 1944 and 1953, Collins' research was primarily focused on exploring the National Petroleum Reserve–Alaska, formerly National Petroleum Reserve No.4. Her team's research focused on drilling holes and studying where oil may be abundant. The test results indicated which regions held a significant amount of petroleum, and provided information about the rock layers in the location. More specifically, the results showed that the rocks on the Topagoruk test 1 area ranged from the Cretaceous to the Devonian geologic periods. Among the rocks found by this drilling are: siltstone, sandstone, short conglomerate and shale - a small amount of oil was found in this location as well. However, the rocks found in the East Topagoruk area were formed in the Lower and Upper Cretaceous geological period, and the group of rocks in this location is also known as the Nanushuk group - shale can be found in the lower beds of this geological formation, and sandstone can be found on its upper beds.

After many holes had been drilled around a specific area, the team would compile findings to establish stratigraphic data. They would also use seismic and gravity surveys in the drilled areas to establish the structure of the area.

== Accomplishments ==
Collins was a co-founder of the Northern Alaska Environmental Center (NAEC). They present the Florence Collins Award each year to an individual for a "significant contribution to conservation in Alaska".

Florence Collins was also an author. Florence published a total of 5 books. “Test Wells, Topagoruk Area, Alaska” published 1958. “Test Wells Umiat Area Alaska” was published in 1958. “Test wells, Meade and Kaolak areas, Alaska” published in 1958. “Test Wells, Square Lake and Wolf Creek areas, Alaska” published in 1959. Her final publication was “Core Tests and Test Wells, Barrow Area, Alaska” published in 1961.

Collins was also involved with the Subsistence Resource Commission (SRC) for over 20 years. The SRC worked to build a relationship between the Park Service at Denali National Park and Preserve and local residents following a subsistence lifestyle. In 2007, Collins received an award for "lifetime achievement" from the National Park Service.
