= Revelation Mountains =

Part of the Alaska Range in Alaska, United States

The Revelation Mountains are a small, rugged subrange of the Alaska Range in Alaska, United States. They mark the furthest western extent of the Alaska Range. The range is rarely visited because of the flying time necessary to get there and also because of the notoriously poor weather conditions that are prevalent in the range. The highest peak in the range is Mount Hesperus (9,828 feet; 2,996 m).

== Description ==
The Revelation Mountains are located approximately 140 miles (225 km) west-northwest of Anchorage, and approximately 130 miles (210 km) southwest of Denali. They are accessed by small plane; the closest airports to the range are near Anchorage and in Talkeetna, which is also approximately 130 miles (210 km) away. This makes access to the range very expensive; the weather also creates the potential for delays in reaching the range (both to drop off climbers and to pick them up).

The principal peaks of the Revelation Mountains are granite spires, rising out of relatively low-elevation glacial valleys. The high vertical relief in the Revelations makes the range a very dramatic place and also creates challenging climbing conditions, despite the low absolute elevation of the peaks.

The Revelations are drained on the northwest by the Big River, one branch of which flows from the Revelation Glacier, which is the main glacier of the core of the range. On the southwest they are drained by the Swift River, while the valleys of the southeast side feed the Stony River. The east and northeast slopes lead to the Hartman and South Fork Kuskokwim Rivers.

== History ==
The first recorded visit to the range occurred in July 1967 by David Roberts and his party from the Harvard Mountaineering Club. The group achieved a few first ascents, and subsequently named the range and many of its notable peaks. In his American Alpine Journal article, Roberts writes of extremely bad weather, including very high winds that frequented the range, and also of challenging climbing conditions. The Roberts party spent 52 straight days in the range. Roberts named the range the Revelation Mountains, and gave many of the peaks Biblical names because he had been reading aloud from the Bible as part of his English literature studies at the University of Denver and thought the apocalyptic descriptions in the Book of Revelation matched the landscape of the mountain range.

== Selected peaks in the Revelation Mountains ==
- Mount Hesperus (9,828 feet; 2,996 m). First ascent by Justin Lesueur (New Zealand) and Karl Swanson, Stephen Spalding (Alaska), May 1985.
- The Apocalypse (9,345 feet; 2,848 m) First ascent by Clint Helander, Jason Stuckey, April 2013.
- The Angel (9,265 feet; 2,824 m). First ascent by Greg Collins, Tom Walter.
- Mount Mausolus (9,170 feet; 2,800 m). First ascent March, 2011 (Clint Helander, Scotty Vincik).
- The Four Horsemen (8,600 feet; 2,600 m) First ascent by Greg Collins, Tom Walter.
- Golgotha (8,940 feet; 2,720 m). First ascent March 28, 2012 (Clint Helander, Ben Trocki).
- South Buttress (9,345 feet; 2,848 m). First ascent August 28, 1967 (Fetcher, G. Millikan, R. Millikan).
- Ice Pyramid (9,250 feet; 2,820 m). First ascent May 3, 2009 (Clint Helander, Seth Holden).
- Obelisk (9,304 feet; 2,836 m). First ascent March 22, 2015 (Clint Helander, John Giraldo).
- Exodus (8,385 feet; 2,556 m). First ascent May 2008 (Clint Helander, Steve Sinor and Seth Holden).
- Mt. Patmos (~9,000 feet; 2,700 m). First ascent August 22, 1967 (Hale, Roberts).
- Hydra Peak (~7,800 feet; 2,400 m). First ascent July 29, 1967 (Fetcher, Hale, Roberts).
- The Sylph (~7,600 feet; 2,300 m). First ascent August 20, 1967 (Roberts).
- The Cherub (~7,305 feet; 2,227 m). First ascent August 4, 1967 (G. Millikan, R. Millikan, Roberts).
- Sentry Peak (~7,294 feet; 2,223 m). First ascent August 3, 1967 (Hale, Roberts).
- Century Peak (~7,100 feet; 2,200 m). First ascent July 28, 1967 (Fetcher, Hale, Roberts).
- Babel Tower
- P8351 (8,351 feet; 2,545 m)
- Peak 9076 East face couloir, First ascent May 1994 IV 5.9 A1 (P. Gonzales, J. Funsten, S. Raynor) AAJ
- Peak 8910 NF to E ridge, First ascent May 1994 III 5.4 (P. Gonzales, J. Funsten, S Raynor) AAJ
- Peak 6780 S. Face couloir, First ascent May 1994 Ski, class 4 (P. Gonzales, J Funsten, S. Raynor) AAJ
