= Nikolai Airport =

Airport in Alaska, United States

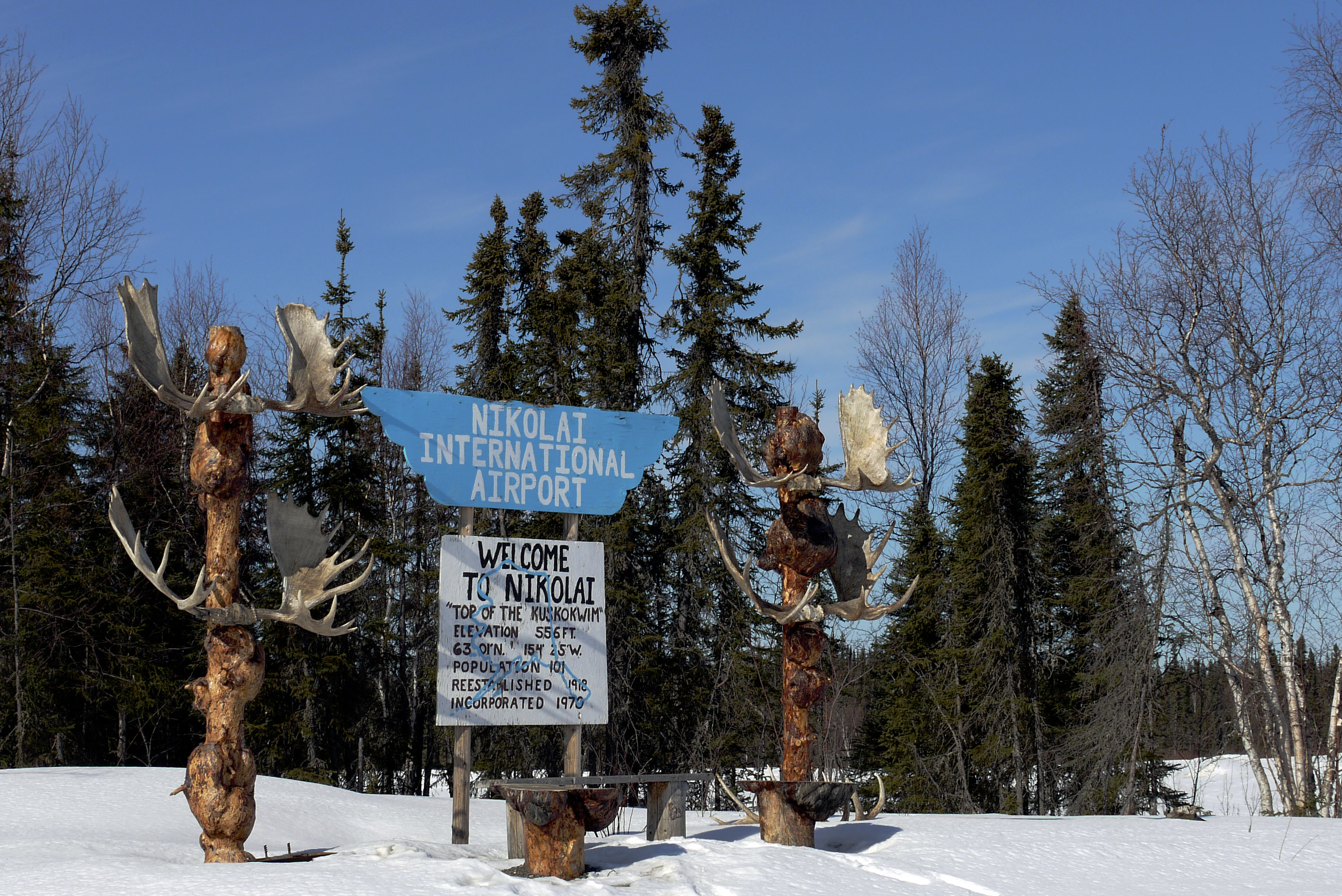
- IATA: NIB; ICAO: PAFS; FAA LID: FSP

Summary
- Airport type: Public
- Owner: State of Alaska DOT&PF - Central Region
- Serves: Nikolai, Alaska
- Elevation AMSL: 441 ft (134 m)
- Coordinates: 63°01′07″N 154°21′30″W

Map
- Location of airport in Alaska

Runways
Direction	Length		Surface
Direction	ft	m	Surface
4/22	4,003	1,220	Gravel
- Source: Federal Aviation Administration

Nikolai Airport (IATA: NIB, ICAO: PAFS, FAA LID: FSP) is a state-owned public-use airport located one nautical mile (1.85 km) northeast of the central business district of Nikolai, a city in the Yukon-Koyukuk Census Area of the U.S. state of Alaska.

As per Federal Aviation Administration records, the airport had 364 passenger boardings (enplanements) in calendar year 2008, a decrease of 21% from the 459 enplanements in 2007. This airport is included in the FAA's National Plan of Integrated Airport Systems for 2009–2013, which categorized it as a general aviation facility.

Although many U.S. airports use the same three-letter location identifier for the FAA and IATA, this airport is assigned FSP by the FAA and NIB by the IATA (which assigned FSP to Saint Pierre Airport in Saint Pierre and Miquelon).

== Facilities ==
Nikolai Airport covers an area of 76 acres (31 ha) at an elevation of 441 feet (134 m) above mean sea level. It has one runway designated 4/22 with a gravel surface measuring 4,003 by 75 feet (1,220 x 23 m).

== Airlines and destinations ==
Airlines	Destinations
Tanana Air Service	McGrath

== See also ==
- List of airports in Alaska
