= Kuskokwim River =

River in Alaska, United States

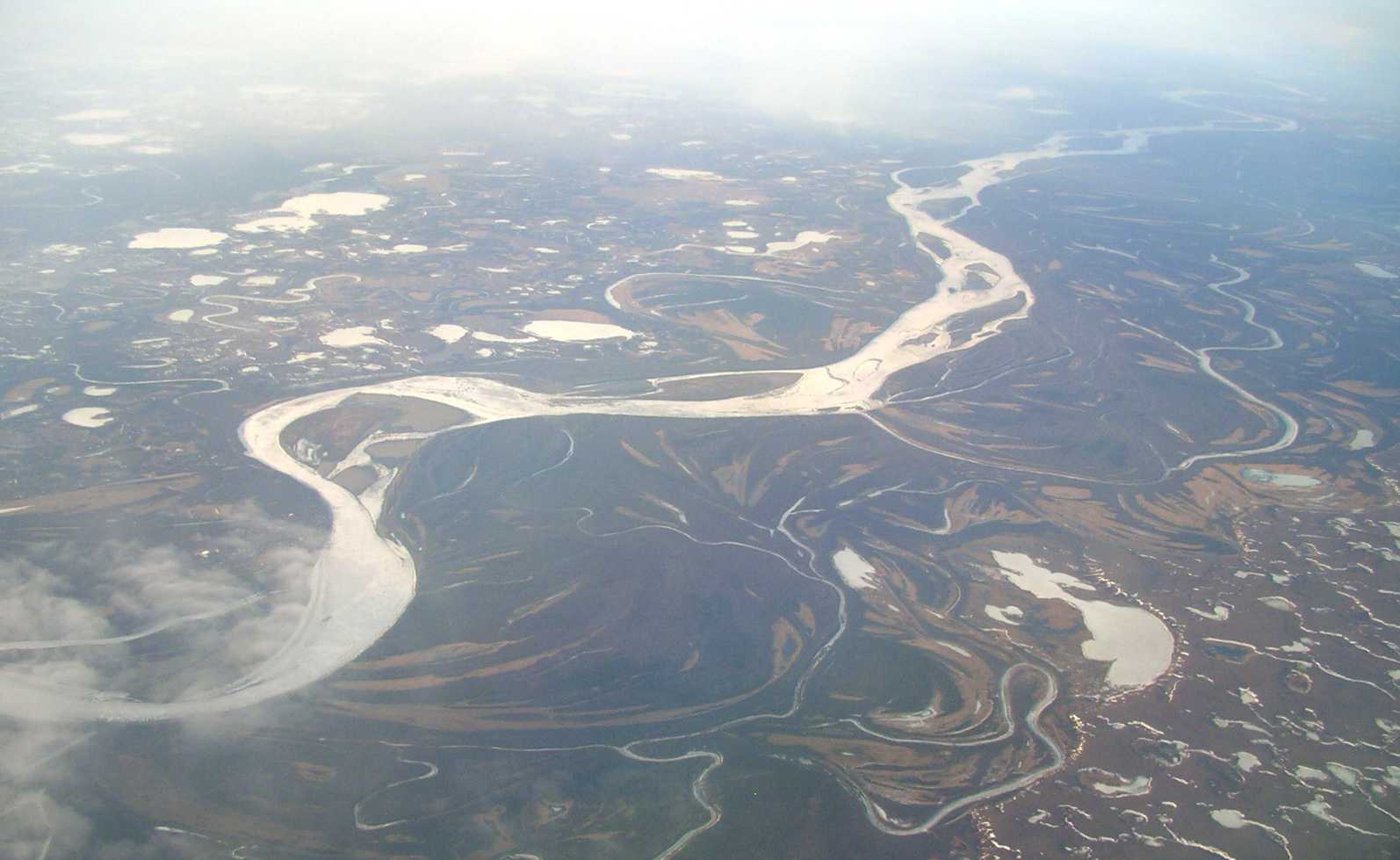
- Aerial photograph of the river

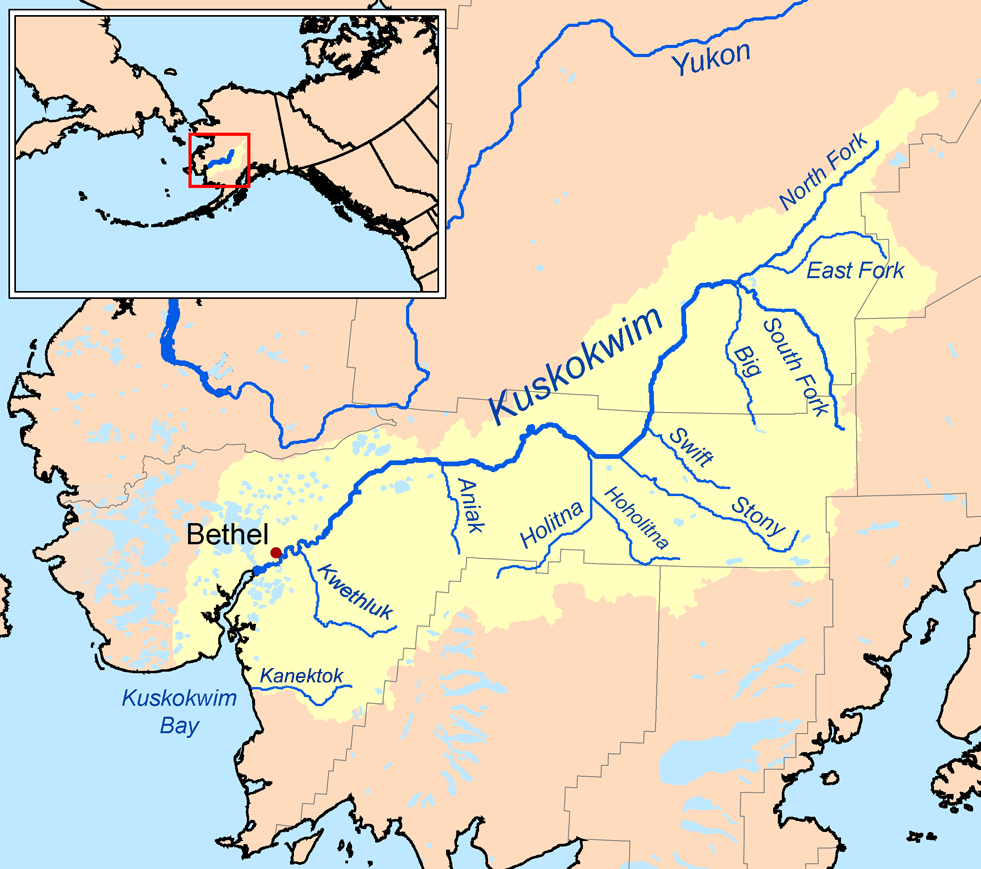
- Watershed of the Kuskokwim River in Alaska
- Etymology: from the Yupʼik, kusquqviim
- Native name: Kusquqvak (Central Yupik); Dichinanekʼ (Upper Kuskokwim); Digenegh (Degexit'an)

Location
- Country: United States
- State: Alaska
- Districts: Bethel Census Area; Yukon–Koyukuk Census Area

Physical characteristics
- Source: confluence of the river's east and north forks
  - location: near Medfra, Yukon–Koyukuk Census Area
  - coordinates: 63°05′16″N 154°38′33″W
  - elevation: 3,655 ft (1,114 m)
- Mouth: Kuskokwim Bay
  - location: near Eek, Bethel Census Area
  - coordinates: 60°04′59″N 162°20′02″W
  - elevation: 0 ft (0 m)
- Length: 702 mi (1,130 km)
- Basin size: 48,000 sq mi (120,000 km^{2})
- Discharge
  - location: mouth
  - average: 67,000 cu ft/s (1,900 m^{3}/s)

The Kuskokwim River or Kusko River (Yupʼik: Kusquqvak; Deg Xinag: Digenegh; Upper Kuskokwim: Dichinanekʼ; Russian: Кускоквим (Kuskokvim)) is a river, 702 miles (1,130 km) long, in Southwest Alaska in the United States. It is the ninth largest river in the United States by average discharge volume at its mouth and seventeenth largest by basin drainage area. The Kuskokwim River is the longest river system contained entirely within a single U.S. state.

The river provides the principal drainage for an area of the remote Alaska Interior on the north and west side of the Alaska Range, flowing southwest into Kuskokwim Bay on the Bering Sea. The highest point in its watershed is Mount Russell. Except for its headwaters in the mountains, the river is broad and flat for its entire course, making it a useful transportation route for many types of watercraft, as well as road vehicles during the winter when it is frozen over. It is the longest free flowing river in the United States.

Kuskokwim derives from the relative case form of Kusquqvak Kusquqviim, as used in Kusquqviim painga (the mouth of the Kuskokwim).

The Indigenous peoples of the Kuskokwim river region are Yupʼik peoples on the lower Kuskokwim, Deg Xitʼan on the middle Kuskokwim, Upper Kuskokwim people on the upper Kuskokwim, and Koyukon people on the North Fork, Lake Minchumina.

== Name ==
The river's name Kuskokwim derives from the relative case form of Kusquqvak Kusquqviim, as used in Kusquqviim painga (the mouth of the Kuskokwim). The name was first recorded by a Russian sailor in 1826. The Tanana (Athabaskan) name for the river was Chin-ana. Upper Kuskokwim (Kolchan) is often used to mean the people of the upper parts of the river, while Yup'ik people live along the lower river.

== Course ==
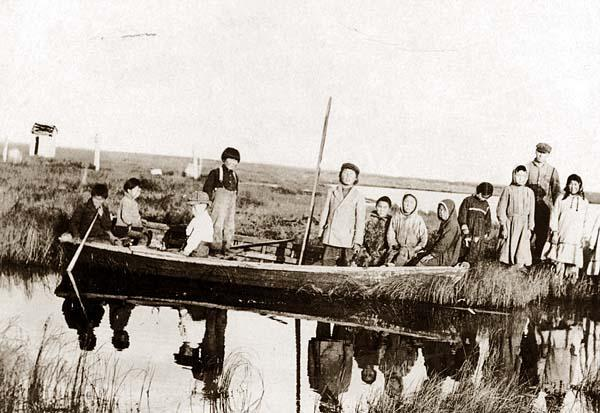
Yup'ik at Moravian Mission Station at Kuskokwim River in the year 1900

The river is formed by the confluence of East Fork Kuskokwim River and North Fork Kuskokwim River, 5 miles (8 km) east of Medfra. From there it flows southwest to Kuskokwim Bay and the Bering Sea.

The Kuskokwim is fed by several forks in central and south-central Alaska. The North Fork (250 mi/400 km) rises in the Kuskokwim Mountains approximately 200 miles (320 km) WSW of Fairbanks and flows southwest in a broad valley. The South Fork (200 mi/320 km) rises in the southwestern end of the Alaska Range west of Mount Gerdine and flows north-northwest through the mountains, past Nikolai, receiving other streams that descend from the Alaska Range northwest of Denali. The two forks join near Medfra, and from there the main stem of the Kuskokwim flows southwest, past McGrath, in a remote valley between the Kuskokwim Mountains to the north and the Alaska Range to the south.

In southwest Alaska the river emerges from the Kuskokwim Mountains in a vast lake-studded alluvial plain south of the Yukon River, surrounded by large spruce forests. It passes a series of Yup'ik villages, including Aniak, and approaches within 50 mi (80 km) of the Yukon before diverging southwest. Southwest of Bethel, the largest community on the river, it broadens into a wide marshy delta that enters Kuskokwim Bay approximately 50 mi (80 km) SSW of Bethel. The lower river below Aniak is located within the Yukon Delta National Wildlife Refuge.

The river receives the Big River from the south approximately 20 miles (32 km) southwest of Medfra. It receives the Swift, Stony, and Holitna rivers from the south at the southern end of the Kuskokwim Mountains before emerging on the coastal plain. It receives the Aniak River from the south at Aniak. Approximately 20 miles (32 km) upstream from Bethel it receives the Kisaralik and Kwethluk rivers from the south. It receives the Eek River from the east at Eek near its mouth on Kuskokwim Bay.

== History ==
The principal economic activities along the river have historically been fur trapping and fishing. Subsistence fishing for salmon and whitefish provides a staple of the Yup'ik diet along the river. Economic deposits of placer gold were discovered in 1901 near Aniak. Mineral production in the region has mainly been from scattered placer gold deposits that through 2004 had produced a total of 3.5 million troy ounces of gold. The primary route of the Iditarod Trail follows the South Fork Kuskokwim River out of the Alaska Range and crosses the main stem of the river near McGrath.

== See also ==
- List of rivers of Alaska
- List of longest rivers of the United States (by main stem)
- Kuskokwim Bay
- Kuskokwim Delta
- Kuskokwim Mountains
- Kuskokwim 300

== Works cited ==
- Benke, Arthur C., ed., and Cushing, Colbert E., ed. (2005). Rivers of North America. Burlington, Massachusetts: Elsevier Academic Press. ISBN 0-12-088253-1.
- Bright, William. (2004). Native American Placenames of the United States. Norman, Oklahoma: University of Oklahoma Press. ISBN 0-8061-3598-0.
