= Stony River (Alaska) =

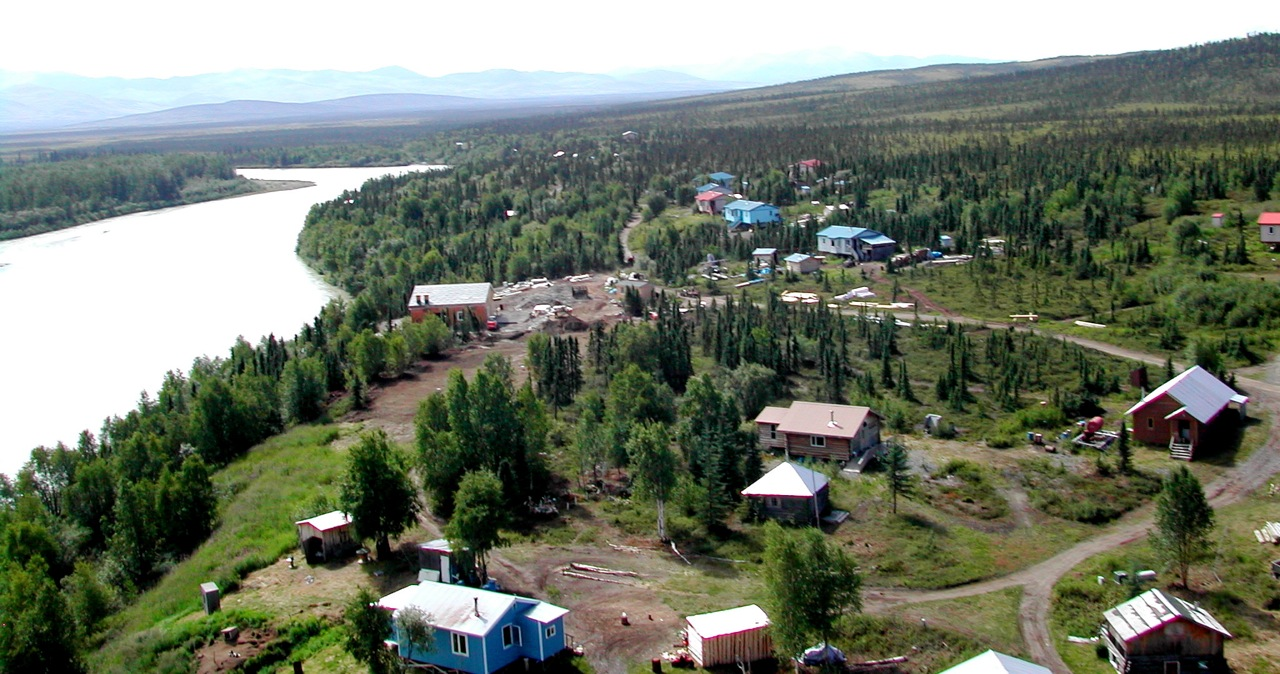

- Location of the mouth of the Stony River in Alaska
- Native name: Gidighuyghatno' (Degexit'an); Giqedhatno' (Degexit'an); K'qizaghetnu (Denaʼina)

Location
- Country: United States
- State: Alaska
- Census Area: Bethel

Physical characteristics
- Source: Stony Glacier
  - location: Revelation Mountains, Alaska Range
  - coordinates: 61°36′18″N 153°45′40″W
  - elevation: 2,856 ft (871 m)
- Mouth: Kuskokwim River
  - location: 20 miles (32 km) northeast of Sleetmute
  - coordinates: 61°46′10″N 156°35′28″W
  - elevation: 200 ft (61 m)
- Length: 190 mi (310 km)

The Stony River (Deg Xinag: Gidighuyghatno' Giqedhatno; Dena'ina: K'qizaghetnu) is a 190-mile (310 km) tributary of the Kuskokwim River in the U.S. state of Alaska. The river flows south from near Mount Mausolus in the Revelation Mountains of the Alaska Range through the northwestern corner of Lake Clark National Park and Preserve. From there, it flows generally westward to meet the larger river at the community of Stony River.

== Boating ==
The Stony River, navigable by kayak, canoe, and small to medium raft, is "suitable for moderately experienced boaters with good wilderness skills." The river varies in difficulty from Class I (easy) to II (medium) on the International Scale of River Difficulty. Dangers include rocky rapids in the 19 miles (31 km) of stream passing through canyons, where standing waves may reach up to 8 feet (2.4 m) in high water.

== See also ==
- List of Alaska rivers
