= Swift River (Alaska) =

- Location of the mouth of the Swift River in Alaska
- Native name: Xelinhdi (Degexit'an); Huch'altnu (Denaʼina)

Location
- Country: United States
- State: Alaska
- Census Area: Bethel

Physical characteristics
- Source: glaciers in the Revelation Mountains
  - location: Alaska Range
  - coordinates: 61°42′50″N 154°03′32″W
  - elevation: 5,476 ft (1,669 m)
- Mouth: Kuskokwim River
  - location: 13 miles (21 km) northeast of Sleetmute
  - coordinates: 61°53′20″N 156°18′30″W
  - elevation: 226 ft (69 m)
- Length: 100 mi (160 km)

The Swift River (Deg Xinag: Xelinhdi; Dena'ina: Huch'altnu) is a tributary, about 100 miles (160 km) long, of the Kuskokwim River in the U.S. state of Alaska. Formed by meltwater from several glaciers in the Revelation Mountains of the Alaska Range, the river flows generally west and northwest to meet the larger stream 13 miles (21 km) northeast of Sleetmute.

The Swift is 13 miles (21 km) upriver from the village of Stony River, not Sleetmute.
