= Quill (software) =

Suite of software tools

Quill is a suite of software tools. It was published by D.C. Heath and Company, in Lexington, MA, USA.

The Quill software was designed and developed in 1982–84 by a team led by Bertram Bruce and Andee Rubin. Its purpose was to help in the creation of functional learning environments that involved extensive writing and reading. It had many features that addressed one or more of six pedagogical goals: Encourage writing for peers; develop writing skill in the context of meaningful communication with real audiences; encourage feedback from others; provide motivation to read the writing of others; facilitate revision; and help with the mechanics of writing.

== Reviews ==
The complete system, including the software, the Quill Teacher's Guide, and other support materials, was validated by the Joint Dissemination Review Panel of the U.S Department of Education in March 1984.

The software had positive reviews in Computers, Reading and Language Arts, The New York Times, The Boston Globe, Popular Computing, Harvard University Gazette, Electronic Learning, Teaching and Computers, Informatica Oggi, English Journal, Early Years/K-8, Computer Update, Classroom Computer Learning, The Computing Teacher, Language Arts, Today's Education, and many other publications.

== Hardware ==
Quill ran on Apple II+ and Apple IIe computers with 64K bytes of memory and required two floppy disk drives, a monitor, an 80-character, upper and lower case card, and a printer.

== Software components ==
Quill comprised four interrelated programs. Writer’s Assistant was a general word processor that could be used independently. However, within Quill it was not invoked by name but accessed indirectly by functions in PLANNER, LIBRARY, or MAILBAG, such as "seeing" someone else’s text in the LIBRARY. Students decided which program to use according to their purpose for writing.

PLANNER was a tool that helped students organize ideas for writing, then share their newly created organizing tools. LIBRARY was a writing environment in which students could make their writing accessible to others by storing it with the full authors' names, the full title, and keywords indicating topic, genre, or other characteristics of the piece. MAILBAG was an in-class email system in which students could send messages to other students, the teacher, small groups, or a bulletin board. Those messages could be forwarded to other classrooms using a variety of networking tools available at the time.
