= Mount Hesperus (Alaska) =

Mountain in Alaska, United States

- Location within Alaska

Highest point
- Elevation: 9,828 ft (2,996 m)
- Prominence: 6,978 ft (2,127 m)
- Listing: North America prominent peak 81st
- Coordinates: 61°48′14″N 154°08′41″W

Geography
- Location: Bethel Census Area, Alaska, U.S.
- Parent range: Revelation Mountains, Alaska Range
- Topo map: USGS Lime Hills D-4

Climbing
- First ascent: 1985 by Justin Lesueur, Karl Swanson, Stephen Spalding
- Easiest route: rock/snow/ice climb

Mount Hesperus is the highest peak of the Revelation Mountains, the westernmost subrange of the Alaska Range. The Revelations are a small, rarely visited range, but they contain dramatic rock peaks, rising from low bases. Mount Hesperus is particularly impressive in terms of local relief: for example, it drops over 7,500 feet (2,300 m) in less than 2 miles (3 km) on two sides. Such steepness for this amount of relief makes Hesperus comparable to the best peaks in North America.

Mount Hesperus lies to the north of most of the other peaks of the Revelation Mountains, between two forks of the Big River. To the southwest of the peak lies the Revelation Glacier. The peak is over 100 miles (160 km) from the closest significant airport.

The first ascent of Mount Hesperus was on May 2, 1985, by Justin Lesueur of New Zealand and Karl Swanson and Stephen Spalding of Alaska. They first attempted routes on the northeast side of the peak, and then successfully ascended a route on the southwest face, which involved snow climbing, some rock bands, a frozen waterfall, and an icy, corniced ridge.

== See also ==
- List of mountain peaks of North America
  - List of mountain peaks of the United States
    - List of mountain peaks of Alaska
- List of Ultras of the United States

== Sources ==
- Stephen Spaulding, "Hesperus", American Alpine Journal 60 (Vol. 28), 1986.
