= Holitna River =

- Location of the mouth of the Holitna River in Alaska
- Native name: Xaletno (Degexit'an); Rruulitnaq (Central Yupik)

Location
- Country: United States
- State: Alaska
- Census Area: Dillingham, Bethel

Physical characteristics
- Source: confluence of Kogrukluk River and Shotgun Creek
  - location: east flank of the Kuskokwim Mountains, Dillingham Census Area
  - coordinates: 60°50′59″N 157°50′56″W
  - elevation: 376 ft (115 m)
- Mouth: Kuskokwim River
  - location: 1.5 miles (2.4 km) south of Sleetmute, Bethel Census Area
  - coordinates: 61°40′52″N 157°10′07″W
  - elevation: 190 ft (58 m)
- Length: 110 mi (180 km)

The Holitna River (Deg Xinag: Xaletno, Yup'ik: Rruulitnaq) is a 110-mile (180 km) tributary of the Kuskokwim River in the U.S. state of Alaska. Formed by the confluence of Shotgun Creek and the Kogrukluk River east of the Kuskokwim Mountains, the river flows generally northeast to meet the larger river near Sleetmute.

Operation Holitna, a federal investigation into child pornography, was named after the river. The Holitna River has many tributaries, serving as a metaphor for the fact that each time the investigation makes an arrest, several new victims and leads are discovered.

== See also ==
- List of rivers of Alaska
