= McGrath, Alaska =

McGrath: Tochak’ (Upper Kuskokwim); Digenegh (Degexit'an)
- City
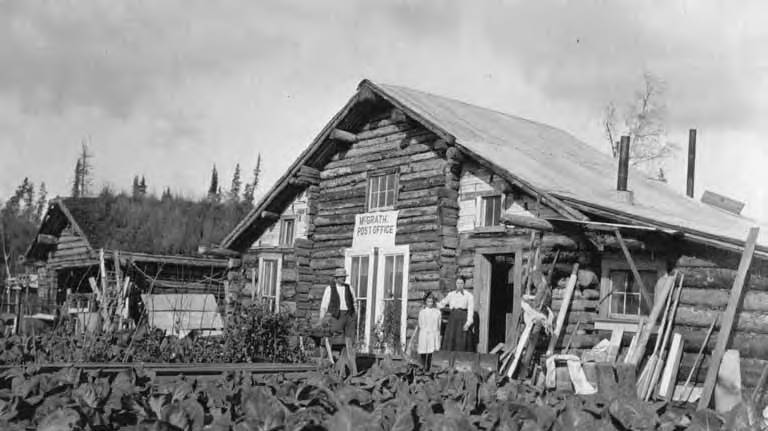
- McGrath Post Office, September 1914

- Location in Alaska
- Coordinates: 62°57′07″N 155°34′38″W
- Country: United States
- State: Alaska
- Census Area: Yukon-Koyukuk
- Incorporated: June 3, 1975

Government
  - Mayor: Mike Tierney
  - State senator: Mike Cronk (R)
  - State rep.: Rebecca Schwanke (R)

Area
  - Total: 47.94 sq mi (124.17 km^{2})
  - Land: 42.33 sq mi (109.64 km^{2})
  - Water: 5.61 sq mi (14.53 km^{2})
- Elevation: 331 ft (101 m)

Population (2020)
  - Total: 301
  - Density: 7.1/sq mi (2.75/km^{2})
- Time zone: UTC−9 (Alaska (AKST))
  - Summer (DST): UTC−8 (AKDT)
- ZIP code: 99627
- Area code: 907
- FIPS code: 02-46010
- GNIS feature ID: 1406131, 2419425

McGrath is a city and village on the Kuskokwim River in Alaska, United States. The population was 301 at the 2020 census. Despite its small population, the village is an important transportation and economic hub for the area.

== History ==
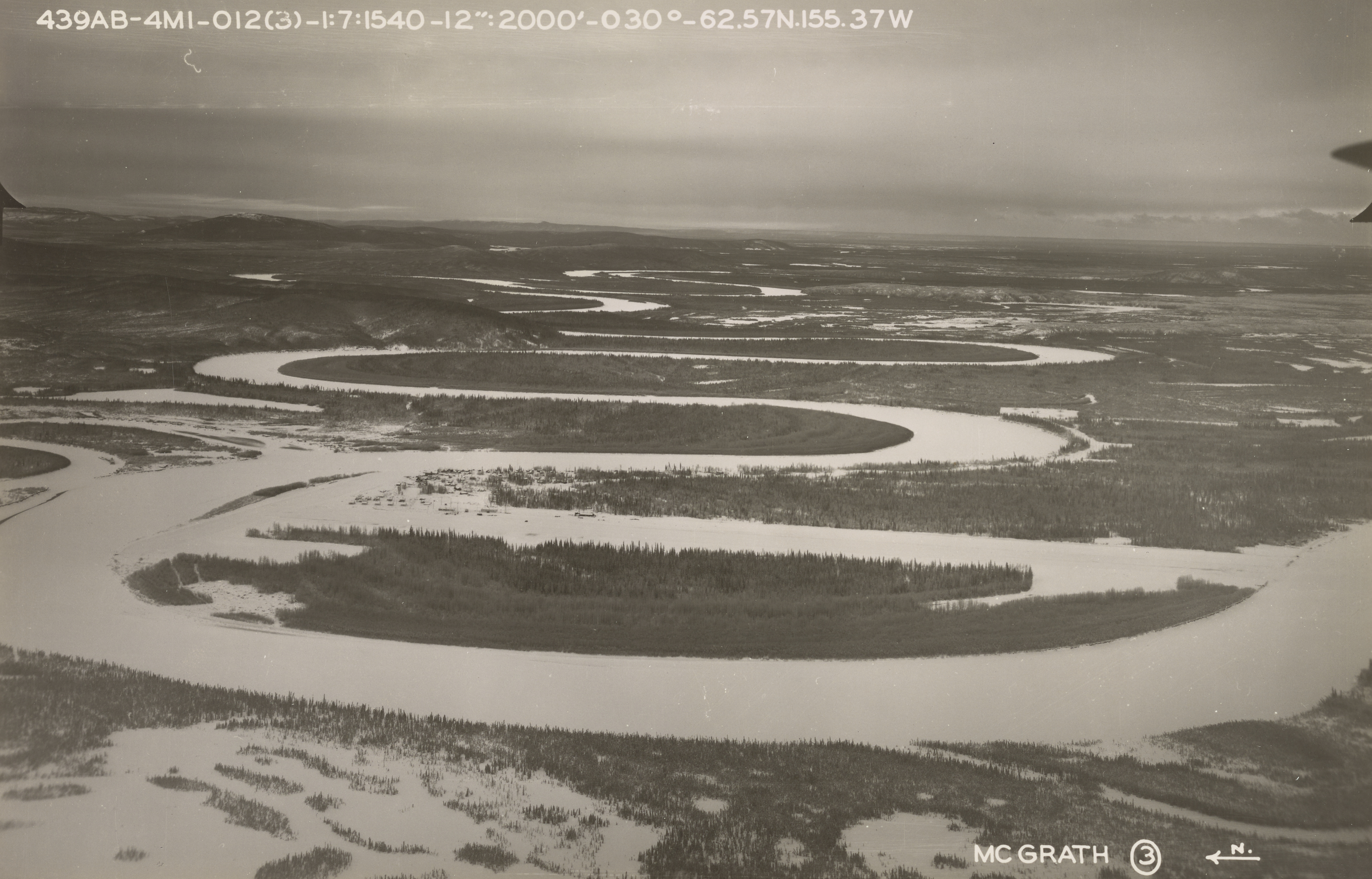
McGrath, 1944

The Old Town McGrath site, across the river from present-day McGrath, was a meeting and trading place for Big River, Nikolai, Telida, and Lake Minchumina villagers.

In 1904, Abraham Appel established a trading post in Old Town. In 1906, gold was discovered in the Innoko District, and in 1907, and at Ganes Creek. Since McGrath was the northernmost point on the Kuskokwim River accessible by large riverboats, it became a regional supply center. A town was established at the site of Old McGrath in 1907, and was named for Peter McGrath, a local United States Marshal. The Iditarod Trail also contributed to McGrath's role as a supply center. From 1911 to 1920, hundreds of people walked and mushed over the trail on their way to the Ophir gold districts. Mining sharply declined after 1925.

After a major flood in 1933, some residents moved across the river. Changes in the course of the river eventually left the old site on a slough, making it useless as a river stop. In 1940, an airstrip was cleared, the United States Federal Aviation Administration built a communications complex, and a school was opened. McGrath became an important refueling stop for Lend-Lease equipment during World War II.

== Geography ==
McGrath is located in Interior Alaska, 221 miles northwest of Anchorage and 269 miles southwest of Fairbanks. It is situated along the convergence of the Takotna River and the south bank of the Kuskokwim River.

According to the United States Census Bureau, the city has a total area of 54.6 square miles (141 km^{2}), of which, 48.9 square miles (127 km^{2}) of it is land and 5.7 square miles (15 km^{2}) of it (10.48%) is water.

== Climate ==
McGrath has a continental subarctic climate (Köppen Dfc).

Climate data for McGrath Airport, Alaska (1991–2020 normals, (Note: Mean monthly maxima and minima (i.e. the highest and lowest temperature readings during an entire month or year) calculated based on data at said location from 1991 to 2020.) extremes 1939–present)
Month	Jan	Feb	Mar	Apr	May	Jun	Jul	Aug	Sep	Oct	Nov	Dec	Year
Record high °F (°C)	54 (12)	55 (13)	55 (13)	68 (20)	86 (30)	94 (34)	90 (32)	89 (32)	76 (24)	67 (19)	50 (10)	49 (9)	94 (34)
Mean maximum °F (°C)	33.2 (0.7)	40.2 (4.6)	43.4 (6.3)	58.3 (14.6)	75.4 (24.1)	81.8 (27.7)	82.6 (28.1)	77.4 (25.2)	66.0 (18.9)	52.7 (11.5)	35.3 (1.8)	32.9 (0.5)	85.3 (29.6)
Mean daily maximum °F (°C)	2.6 (−16.3)	14.7 (−9.6)	24.5 (−4.2)	42.9 (6.1)	58.9 (14.9)	68.8 (20.4)	69.5 (20.8)	64.0 (17.8)	53.9 (12.2)	34.5 (1.4)	14.9 (−9.5)	5.5 (−14.7)	37.9 (3.3)
Daily mean °F (°C)	−5.8 (−21.0)	4.5 (−15.3)	11.9 (−11.2)	32.2 (0.1)	48.4 (9.1)	58.7 (14.8)	60.8 (16.0)	55.9 (13.3)	46.0 (7.8)	28.4 (−2.0)	8.0 (−13.3)	−2.3 (−19.1)	28.9 (−1.7)
Mean daily minimum °F (°C)	−14.1 (−25.6)	−5.6 (−20.9)	−0.7 (−18.2)	21.5 (−5.8)	38.0 (3.3)	48.6 (9.2)	52.1 (11.2)	47.8 (8.8)	38.0 (3.3)	22.4 (−5.3)	1.1 (−17.2)	−10.0 (−23.3)	19.9 (−6.7)
Mean minimum °F (°C)	−46.6 (−43.7)	−38.7 (−39.3)	−27.7 (−33.2)	−4.7 (−20.4)	23.7 (−4.6)	36.8 (2.7)	42.8 (6.0)	34.1 (1.2)	22.2 (−5.4)	0.1 (−17.7)	−26.4 (−32.4)	−39.0 (−39.4)	−49.0 (−45.0)
Record low °F (°C)	−75 (−59)	−64 (−53)	−51 (−46)	−40 (−40)	−2 (−19)	27 (−3)	31 (−1)	25 (−4)	2 (−17)	−28 (−33)	−53 (−47)	−67 (−55)	−75 (−59)
Average precipitation inches (mm)	1.15 (29)	0.87 (22)	0.68 (17)	0.74 (19)	0.91 (23)	1.66 (42)	2.50 (64)	2.91 (74)	2.53 (64)	1.46 (37)	1.43 (36)	1.21 (31)	18.05 (458)
Average snowfall inches (cm)	14.7 (37)	12.7 (32)	9.2 (23)	4.4 (11)	0.6 (1.5)	0.0 (0.0)	0.0 (0.0)	0.0 (0.0)	1.4 (3.6)	7.4 (19)	18.2 (46)	17.9 (45)	86.5 (218.1)
Average precipitation days (≥ 0.01 inch)	10.4	9.2	7.8	6.7	9.3	13.1	15.1	16.3	14.0	11.9	11.3	12.0	137.1
Average snowy days (≥ 0.1 inch)	11.3	10.2	8.4	4.8	0.7	0.0	0.0	0.0	1.2	7.5	12.4	13.9	70.4
Average relative humidity (%)	72.2	68.7	64.3	62.1	59.5	63.2	69.7	75.2	74.0	77.9	76.7	74.0	69.8
Average dew point °F (°C)	−13.7 (−25.4)	−9.6 (−23.1)	0.9 (−17.3)	15.3 (−9.3)	30.0 (−1.1)	41.7 (5.4)	47.7 (8.7)	45.5 (7.5)	35.2 (1.8)	18.7 (−7.4)	−0.6 (−18.1)	−11.6 (−24.2)	16.6 (−8.5)
Source: NOAA

== Demographics ==
Historical population
Census	Pop.	Note	%±
1920	90		—
1930	112		24.4%
1940	138		23.2%
1950	175		26.8%
1960	241		37.7%
1970	279		15.8%
1980	355		27.2%
1990	528		48.7%
2000	401		−24.1%
2010	346		−13.7%
2020	301		−13.0%
U.S. Decennial Census

McGrath first appeared on the 1920 U.S. Census as an unincorporated village. It formally incorporated in 1975.

=== 2020 census ===
As of the 2020 census, McGrath had a population of 301. The median age was 40.3 years. 22.6% of residents were under the age of 18 and 17.9% of residents were 65 years of age or older. For every 100 females there were 99.3 males, and for every 100 females age 18 and over there were 106.2 males age 18 and over.

0.0% of residents lived in urban areas, while 100.0% lived in rural areas.

There were 125 households in McGrath, of which 29.6% had children under the age of 18 living in them. Of all households, 31.2% were married-couple households, 29.6% were households with a male householder and no spouse or partner present, and 25.6% were households with a female householder and no spouse or partner present. About 36.8% of all households were made up of individuals and 13.6% had someone living alone who was 65 years of age or older.

There were 165 housing units, of which 24.2% were vacant. The homeowner vacancy rate was 3.3% and the rental vacancy rate was 37.9%.

Racial composition as of the 2020 census
Race	Number	Percent
White	107	35.5%
Black or African American	3	1.0%
American Indian and Alaska Native	170	56.5%
Asian	0	0.0%
Native Hawaiian and Other Pacific Islander	0	0.0%
Some other race	2	0.7%
Two or more races	19	6.3%
Hispanic or Latino (of any race)	7	2.3%

=== 2000 census ===
As of the census of 2000, there were 401 people, 145 households, and 99 families residing in the city. The population density was 8.2 inhabitants per square mile (3.2/km^{2}). There were 213 housing units at an average density of 4.4 per square mile (1.7/km^{2}). The racial makeup of the city was 42.64% White, 43.89% Native American, 0.75% Asian, 0.75% from other races, and 11.97% from two or more races. Hispanic or Latino of any race were 1.00% of the population.

Of the 145 household 42.8% had children under the age of 18 living with them, 45.5% were married couples living together, 11.7% had a female householder with no husband present, and 31.7% were non-families. 26.9% of all households were made up of individuals, and 4.8% had someone living alone who was 65 years of age or older. The average household size was 2.77 and the average family size was 3.34.

In the city, the age distribution of the population shows 35.9% under the age of 18, 8.5% from 18 to 24, 24.7% from 25 to 44, 25.9% from 45 to 64, and 5.0% who were 65 years of age or older. The median age was 33 years. For every 100 females, there were 104.6 males. For every 100 females age 18 and over, there were 107.3 males.

The median income for a household in the city was $43,056, and the median income for a family was $44,167. Males had a median income of $41,875 versus $41,389 for females. The per capita income for the city was $21,553. About 8.7% of families and 9.8% of the population were below the poverty line, including 10.8% of those under age 18 and 17.4% of those age 65 or over.

== Education ==
The Iditarod Area School District operates the McGrath School.

== Media ==
KSKO is a non-commercial NPR affiliate at 89.5 FM. KSKO simulcasts to the villages of Grayling (KGYA), Shageluk (KNKO), Holy Cross (KLOP), Nikolai (KNIB), Sleetmute (KSKP), Crooked Creek (KSKC), and Anvik (KMGS). KSKO has been established since July 1, 1981.

== See also ==
- McGrath Airport
