= Aniak River =

River in Alaska, USA

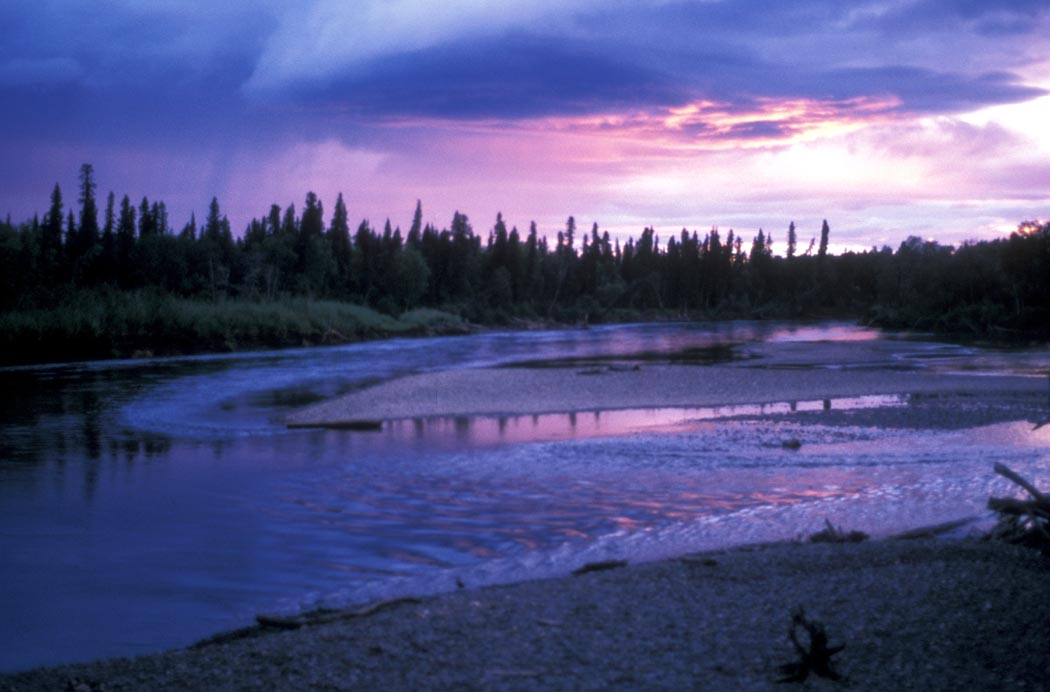
- Sunset along the Aniak River

- Location of the mouth of the Aniak River in Alaska
- Native name: Anyaraq (Central Yupik)

Location
- Country: United States
- State: Alaska
- Census Area: Dillingham, Bethel

Physical characteristics
- Source: Kuskokwim Mountains
  - location: northeast of Kisaralik Lake, Dillingham Census Area
  - coordinates: 60°20′09″N 159°13′12″W
  - elevation: 2,766 ft (843 m)
- Mouth: Kuskokwim River
  - location: Aniak, Bethel Census Area
  - coordinates: 61°34′28″N 159°29′15″W
  - elevation: 52 ft (16 m)
- Length: 95 mi (153 km)

The Aniak River (/ˌæniːˈæk/) (Yup'ik: Anyaraq) is a 95-mile (153 km) tributary of the Kuskokwim River in the U.S. state of Alaska. Beginning south of Aniak Lake, the river generally flows north. The upper sections drain part of the Kilbuck and Kuskokwim mountains, and the lower portions transition to the Kuskokwim lowlands and tundra. The river empties into the Kuskokwim River slightly east of Aniak. Its tributaries are the Salmon, Kipchuk, and Buckstock rivers.

== Overview ==
Aniak is a Yup'ik word meaning "the place where it comes out," which refers to the mouth of the Aniak River where it flows into the Kuskokwim River. This river played a role in the Placer Gold Rush of 1900–01, when prospectors from Nome rushed to the Kuskokwim River Delta after hearing of discoveries along the "Yellow River", later believed to be the Aniak River because of the yellow tint from silt carried from headwater streams. Prospectors returned in 1911 when it was announced gold had again been discovered in the river.

The Aniak is home to five species of Pacific salmon, the most common (about 80-85%) being chum salmon. The others are the Chinook, sockeye, pink, and the coho. Between 2005 and 2009, commercial fisherman brought in an average of 46,316 fish annually. In addition to salmon, the Aniak is home to Arctic char, rainbow trout, Arctic grayling, and, near the river mouth in spring, northern pike and sheefish, making it a prime sports fishing location. In addition, Aniak Lake supports populations of lake trout. Several sports fishing outfitters operate along the Aniak.

Navigation of the river is tricky, since it is swift flowing with multiple channels and many hazards, including debris loads, log jams and sweepers (trees hanging just above the water which "sweep" the surface as it flows by) that change position with each spring's ice breakup cycle. The lower river is more navigable with an experienced boat driver. The upper river, however, is typically only accessed by rafts which can be dropped off by airplane at Aniak Lake, 100 mi (160 km) upstream from the Kuskokwim confluence. The Aniak River itself, approximately 25 mi (40 km) from the mouth, is unusable for surface travel in winter due to incomplete freeze and speed of flow. Historical winter trails parallel most of its length.

== See also ==
- List of rivers of Alaska
