= Bertram Bruce =

American information scientist

Professor Emeritus Bertram C. Bruce
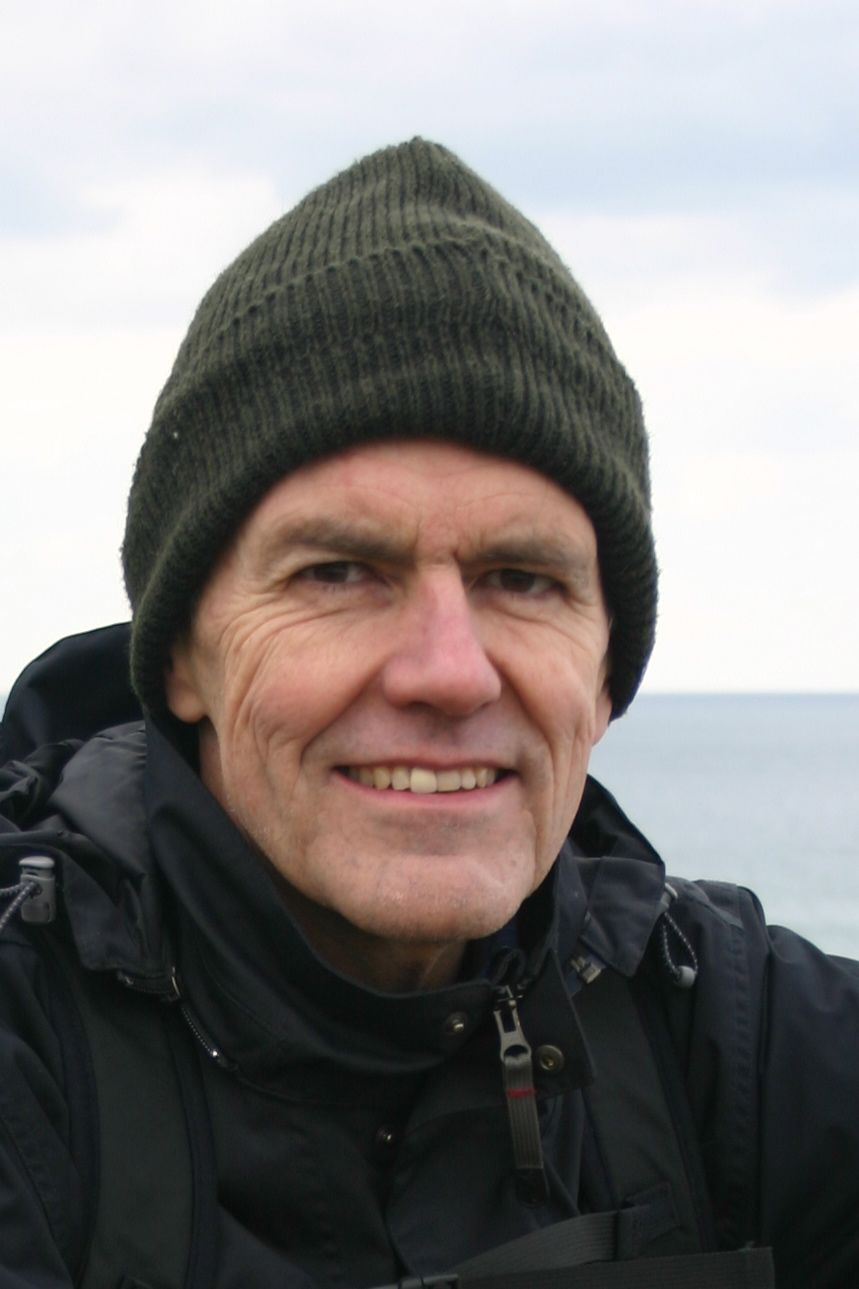
- Bertram C. Bruce, Sheepshead Peninsula, Ireland, June 2005

Academic background
- Education: Ph. D., Computer Sciences
- Alma mater: University of Texas at Austin
- Thesis: The logical structure underlying temporal references in natural language (1971)
- Doctoral advisor: Norman Martin

Academic work
- Discipline: Information Scientist
- Sub-discipline: Community Informatics, Progressive Education, New Literacies, Technology-Enhanced Learning
- Institutions: University of Illinois at Urbana–Champaign, 1990-present, BBN Technologies, 1974–90, Rutgers University, 1971–74
- Website: http://chipbruce.net

Bertram C. "Chip" Bruce is an American educator, information scientist, and computer scientist, whose recent research has focused on democratic education. He is currently Professor Emeritus in Information Science at the University of Illinois and previously a Fulbright Distinguished Chair at National College of Ireland.

== Books ==
- Eryaman, Mustafa Yunus, & Bruce, Bertram C. (editors) (2015). International handbook of progressive education. New York: Peter Lang. [833 pp.; ISBN 978-1-4331-2874-5 pb.; ISBN 978-1-4331-2875-2 hb.]
- Bruce, Bertram C., Bishop, Ann Peterson, & Budhathoki, Nama R. (Eds.) (2014). Youth community inquiry: New media for community and personal growth (New Literacies and Digital Epistemologies series). New York: Peter Lang. [195 pp.; ISBN 978-1433124037]
- Kapitzke, Cushla, & Bruce, Bertram C. (2006). Libr@ries: Changing information space and practice. Mahwah, NJ: Lawrence Erlbaum. [308 pp.; ISBN 0-8058-5481-9]
- Bruce, Bertram C. (Ed.) (2003). Literacy in the information age: Inquiries into meaning making with new technologies. Newark, DE: International Reading Association. [364 pp.; ISBN 0-87207-003-4]
  - Translated into Chinese by Huang, Jenn Jia & Chang, Shuling as 數 位時代的資訊素養 : 運用科技進行知識建構, or Information technology literacy at digital age: Knowledge construction with information technology. Taipei, Taiwan: Pro-Ed.
- Alvermann, Donna E., Arrington, H. J., Bridge, C. A., Bruce, Bertram C., Fountas, I. C., Garcia, E., Paris, S. G., Ruiz, N. T., Schmidt, B. A., Searfoss, L. W., & Winograd, P. (1995). Teacher to teacher: A professional's handbook for the primary classroom. Lexington, MA: D. C. Heath. [218 pp.; ISBN 0-669-35984-X]
- Alvermann, Donna E., Arrington, H. J., Bridge, C. A., Bruce, Bertram C., Fountas, I. C., Garcia, E., Paris, S. G., Ruiz, N. T., Schmidt, B. A., Searfoss, L. W., & Winograd, P. (1995). Teacher to teacher: A professional's handbook for the intermediate classroom. Lexington, MA: D. C. Heath. [218 pp.; ISBN 0-669-35985-8]
- Bruce, Bertram C., & Rubin, Ann D. (1993). Electronic Quills: A situated evaluation of using computers for writing in classrooms. Hillsdale, NJ: Lawrence Erlbaum. [232 pp.; ISBN 0-805-81168-0] Held in 389 libraries according to WorldCat
- Bruce, Bertram C., Peyton, Joy Kreeft, & Batson, Trent W. (Eds.). (1993). Network-based classrooms: Promises and realities. New York: Cambridge University Press. [302 pp.; ISBN 0-521-41636-1]
- Bruce, Bertram C., Rubin, Andee, & Loucks, S. (1983). Quill teacher's guide. Andover, MA: The Network. [143 pp.]
- Spiro, Rand J., Bruce, Bertram C., & Brewer, W. F. (Eds.). (1980). Theoretical issues in reading comprehension: Perspectives from cognitive psychology, linguistics, artificial intelligence, and education. Hillsdale, NJ: Lawrence Erlbaum. [586 pp.; ISBN 0-898-59036-1]
