= Russian Mountains (Alaska) =

Mountain range in Alaska, United States

- Location within Alaska

Highest point
- Elevation: 3,077 ft (938 m)

Geography
- Country: United States
- State: Alaska
- Census area: Bethel
- Range coordinates: 61°40′07″N 159°10′34″W

The Russian Mountains (Russian Mission Mountains) are a mountain range in Bethel Census Area, Alaska, USA.

The mountains were named during the "Yellow River Stampede" of the winter of 1900-01 because a Russian Orthodox Mission was located on the south edge of the range.

The range extends north from the Kuskokwim River and east of the Owhat River. It is 9 miles northeast of Aniak, Kilbuck-Kuskokwim Mountains. The highest peak has an elevation of 3,077 feet (938 m).
