= Telida Airport =

- IATA: TLF; ICAO: none; FAA LID: 2K5

Summary
- Airport type: Public
- Owner: Public domain
- Serves: Telida, Alaska
- Elevation AMSL: 650 ft / 198 m
- Coordinates: 63°23′38″N 153°16′08″W

Map
- Location of airport in Alaska

Runways
Direction	Length		Surface
Direction	ft	m	Surface
2/20	1,900	579	Turf/dirt
- Source: Federal Aviation Administration

Telida Airport (IATA: TLF, FAA LID: 2K5) is a public use airport located in Telida, in the Yukon-Koyukuk Census Area of the U.S. state of Alaska.

The National Plan of Integrated Airport Systems for 2011–2015 categorized it as a general aviation facility.

== Facilities ==
Telida Airport resides at elevation of 650 feet (198 m) above mean sea level. It has one runway designated 2/20 with a turf and dirt surface measuring 1,900 by 40 feet (579 x 12 m).

== See also ==
- List of airports in Alaska
