= Iditarod Area School District =

School district in Alaska, United States

Address
- 90 Chinana Avenue McGrath, Alaska, 99627; United States

District information
- Type: Public
- Grades: Pre-K–12
- NCES District ID: 0200520

Students and staff
- Students: 263
- Teachers: 20.8
- Staff: 25.09
- Student–teacher ratio: 12.64

Other information
- Website: www.iditarodsd.org

Iditarod Area School District (IASD) is a school district headquartered in McGrath, Alaska, United States.

== Schools ==
All are K-12 schools:

- Blackwell School - Anvik
- David Louis Memorial School - Grayling
- Holy Cross School
- McGrath School
- Top of the Kuskokwim School - Nikolai
- Innoko River School - Shageluk
- Takotna Community School

It also operates the IASD Distance Learning Center, headquartered in Eagle River.

Former schools:

- Lime School - Lime Village - Closed in 2007 as the school only had six students.
- Minchumina School - Lake Minchumina
- Telida
