= Upper Kuskokwim language =

Athabaskan language

Upper Kuskokwim
- Dinakʼi
- Native to: United States
- Region: Alaska (middle Yukon River, Koyukuk River)
- Ethnicity: 160 Upper Kuskokwim (2007)
- Native speakers: <5 (2020)
- Language family: Na-Dené: Athabaskan; Northern Athabaskan; Upper Kuskokwim
- Writing system: Latin (Northern Athabaskan alphabet)

Official status
- Official language in: Alaska

Language codes
- ISO 639-3: kuu
- Glottolog: uppe1438
- ELP: Upper Kuskokwim
- Upper Kuskokwim is classified as Critically Endangered by the UNESCO Atlas of the World's Languages in Danger.

The Upper Kuskokwim language (also called Kolchan or Goltsan or Dinak'i) is an Athabaskan language of the Na-Dené language family. It is spoken by the Upper Kuskokwim people in the Upper Kuskokwim River villages of Nikolai, Telida, and McGrath, Alaska. About 40 of a total of 160 Upper Kuskokwim people (Dichinanek’ Hwt’ana) still speak the language.

A practical orthography of the language was established by Raymond Collins, who in 1964 began linguistic work at Nikolai.

Since 1990s, the language has also been documented by a Russian linguist Andrej Kibrik.

== Phonology ==
=== Consonants ===
		Labial	Alveolar			Post- alveolar	Retroflex	Palatal	Velar	Glottal
		Labial	plain	sibilant	lateral	Post- alveolar	Retroflex	Palatal	Velar	Glottal
Plosive/ Affricate	plain		t ⟨d⟩	ts ⟨dz⟩	tɬ ⟨dl⟩	tʃ ⟨j⟩	ʈʂ ⟨dr⟩		k ⟨g⟩	ʔ ⟨ʼ⟩
Plosive/ Affricate	aspirated		tʰ ⟨t⟩	tsʰ ⟨ts⟩	tɬʰ ⟨tł⟩	tʃʰ ⟨ch⟩	ʈʂʰ ⟨tr⟩		kʰ ⟨k⟩	
Plosive/ Affricate	ejective		tʼ ⟨tʼ⟩	tsʼ ⟨tsʼ⟩	tɬʼ ⟨tłʼ⟩	tʃʼ ⟨chʼ⟩	ʈʂʼ ⟨trʼ⟩		kʼ ⟨kʼ⟩	
Fricative	voiceless			s ⟨s⟩	ɬ ⟨ł⟩	ʃ ⟨sh⟩	ʂ ⟨sr⟩		x ⟨h⟩	
Fricative	voiced			z ⟨z⟩	ɮ ⟨l⟩		ʐ ⟨zr⟩		ɣ ⟨gh⟩	
Sonorant	voiceless		n̥ ⟨ṉ⟩							
Sonorant	voiced	m ⟨m⟩	n ⟨n⟩					j ⟨y⟩		
Sonorant	glottalized		nˀ ⟨n'⟩					jˀ ⟨y'⟩		

=== Vowels ===
	Front	Back
Close	i ⟨e⟩	u ⟨u⟩
Near-close	ɪ ⟨i⟩	ʊ ⟨w⟩
Open	æ ⟨a⟩	ɒ ⟨o⟩

/ɪ/ may range to either [ɪ] or mid as [ə].

== Morphology ==
=== Nouns ===
Nouns are divided into two classes: those which can be possessed, but do not have to be (such as clothing, animals and lake names) and those which are always possessed (such as body parts).

For the former group, some nouns that are possessed have a change in spelling and pronunciation when they are possessed. For example, the prefix "si-" indicates "my".

Possessive Noun Changes
Upper Kuskokwim	English
tameł	fishnet
sitamela'	my fishnet
nitamela'	your fishnet
mitamela'	his/her fishnet

However, other nouns that may be possessed do not undergo any sound changes, and instead the possession is indicated either by the separate possessive word sich'i, or by the prefix si-. For example, k'esh (birch tree) becomes sich'i k'esh (my birch tree) and tin (trail) becomes sitin ('my trail').

Verbs can be changed into nouns with the suffix -e. This also causes sound changes in some verbs.

=== Adjectives ===
There are few adjectives that modify nouns in Upper Kuskokwim. Adjectives are added after nouns, e.g. nilane gwṉ ('dried meat').

Upper Kuskokwim	English
chwh	big
goya	small
gwṉ	dried
hwts'aka	narrow

== Syntax ==
Upper Kuskokwim uses SOV word order. It is a partially inflectional and partially agglutinative language, and a pro-drop language.

Dina dineje izdlan.
man moose he/she-caught
'The man caught a moose.'

Dineje izdlan.
moose he/she-caught
'He caught a moose.'

Yizdlan.
it-he/she-caught
'He caught it.'

== Bibliography ==
- Alaska Native Language Center. Retrieved on 2007-03-14.
- Collins, Raymond; Collins, Sally Jo (January 2004). Dichinanek' Hwt'ana: A History of the people of the Upper Kuskokwim who live in Nikolai and Telida, Alaska. McGrath, AK. UK964C2004.

== Links ==
- Upper Kuskokwim Language and Culture Preservation
- Dinak'i | Upper Kuskokwim Dictionary iOS app
