= Takotna, Alaska =

Takotna Tochotno’
- Census-designated place
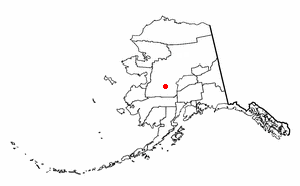
- Location of Takotna, Alaska
- Coordinates: 62°58′56″N 156°05′03″W
- Country: United States
- State: Alaska
- Census Area: Yukon-Koyukuk

Government
  - State senator: Click Bishop (R)
  - State rep.: Mike Cronk (R)

Area
  - Total: 23.41 sq mi (60.62 km^{2})
  - Land: 23.41 sq mi (60.62 km^{2})
  - Water: 0 sq mi (0.00 km^{2})
- Elevation: 492 ft (150 m)

Population (2020)
  - Total: 56
  - Density: 2.4/sq mi (0.92/km^{2})
- Time zone: UTC-9 (Alaska (AKST))
  - Summer (DST): UTC-8 (AKDT)
- ZIP code: 99675
- Area code: 907
- FIPS code: 02-74610
- GNIS ID: 1410562

Takotna (Upper Kuskokwim: Tochotno’ [tʰot͡ʃʰoʔno]) is a census-designated place (CDP) in the Yukon-Koyukuk Census Area, Alaska, United States. As of the 2020 census, Takotna had a population of 56.

== Geography ==
According to the 2010 Census, Takotna is located at 62°58′56″N 156°05′03″W (62.982342, -156.084059). It has a total area of 23.816 square miles (61.68 square kilometers), all of which is land. As per the USGS National Elevation Dataset, the elevation is 492 feet (150 m).

== Demographics ==
Historical population
Census	Pop.	Note	%±
1930	65		—
1940	70		7.7%
1950	42		−40.0%
1960	40		−4.8%
1980	48		—
1990	38		−20.8%
2000	50		31.6%
2010	52		4.0%
2020	56		7.7%
U.S. Decennial Census

Takotna first appeared on the 1930 U.S. Census as an unincorporated village. It appeared on every successive census except in 1970, when it did not return a total. It returned in 1980 and was made a census-designated place (CDP).

As of the 2000 United States census, there were 50 people, 19 households, and 12 families residing in the CDP. The population density was 2.1 inhabitants per square mile (0.81/km^{2}). There were 49 housing units at an average density of 2.1 per square mile (0.81/km^{2}). The racial makeup of the CDP was 58.00% White and 42.00% Native American.

There were 19 households, out of which 31.6% had children under the age of 18 living with them, 36.8% were married couples living together, 15.8% had a female householder with no husband present, and 36.8% were non-families. 36.8% of all households were made up of individuals, and none had someone living alone who was 65 years of age or older. The average household size was 2.63 and the average family size was 3.25.

In the CDP, the age distribution of the population shows 36.0% under the age of 18, 8.0% from 18 to 24, 22.0% from 25 to 44, 24.0% from 45 to 64, and 10.0% who were 65 years of age or older. The median age was 34 years. For every 100 females, there were 92.3 males. For every 100 females age 18 and over, there were 77.8 males.

The median income for a household in the CDP was $14,583, and the median income for a family was $17,500. Males had a median income of $51,250 versus $33,125 for females. The per capita income for the CDP was $13,143. There were 20.0% of families and 16.2% of the population living below the poverty line, including 25.0% of under eighteens and none of those over 64.

== Transportation ==
Takotna Airport is a state owned, public use airport located one nautical mile (2 km) north of Takotna. In 2009, $21 million in federal funding was allotted to build a new airport to serve the community.

== Education ==
The Iditarod Area School District operates the Takotna Community School.
