= Lake Minchumina, Alaska =

Lake Minchumina Menchuh Mene’ / Minchu Mina'
- CDP
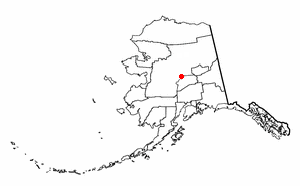
- Location of Lake Minchumina, Alaska
- Coordinates: 63°53′38″N 152°18′7″W
- Country: United States
- State: Alaska
- Census Area: Yukon-Koyukuk

Government
  - State senator: Click Bishop (R)
  - State rep.: Mike Cronk (R)

Area
  - Total: 249.95 sq mi (647.38 km^{2})
  - Land: 226.97 sq mi (587.85 km^{2})
  - Water: 22.98 sq mi (59.53 km^{2})

Population (2020)
  - Total: 30
  - Density: 0.13/sq mi (0.05/km^{2})
- Time zone: UTC-9 (Alaska (AKST))
  - Summer (DST): UTC-8 (AKDT)
- ZIP code: 99757
- Area code: 907
- FIPS code: 02-42820

Lake Minchumina (Koyukon: Menchuh Mene’ [mənt͡ʃʰuh mənə]; Upper Kuskokwim: Minchu Mina’) is a census-designated place (CDP) in Yukon-Koyukuk Census Area, Alaska, United States. As of the 2022 data usa, the population of the CDP is 14.

== Geography ==
Lake Minchumina is located at 63.790254°N 152.461819°W. It is the nearest settlement to the geographic center of Alaska.

According to the United States Census Bureau, the CDP has a total area of 244.1 square miles (632 km^{2}), of which, 216.4 square miles (560 km^{2}) of it is land and 27.7 square miles (72 km^{2}) of it (11.34%) is water.

== Climate ==
Minchumina has a continental subarctic climate (Köppen Dfc).

Climate data for Minchumina, Alaska, 1991–2020 normals, extremes 1945–2022
Month	Jan	Feb	Mar	Apr	May	Jun	Jul	Aug	Sep	Oct	Nov	Dec	Year
Record high °F (°C)	47 (8)	40 (4)	51 (11)	67 (19)	84 (29)	90 (32)	92 (33)	85 (29)	74 (23)	61 (16)	44 (7)	42 (6)	92 (33)
Mean maximum °F (°C)	24.1 (−4.4)	30.1 (−1.1)	37.0 (2.8)	54.5 (12.5)	74.0 (23.3)	79.7 (26.5)	82.7 (28.2)	75.0 (23.9)	65.7 (18.7)	50.3 (10.2)	30.7 (−0.7)	27.8 (−2.3)	83.9 (28.8)
Mean daily maximum °F (°C)	3.1 (−16.1)	9.7 (−12.4)	20.6 (−6.3)	40.6 (4.8)	57.4 (14.1)	68.0 (20.0)	69.0 (20.6)	62.6 (17.0)	51.4 (10.8)	32.2 (0.1)	13.3 (−10.4)	4.7 (−15.2)	36.1 (2.3)
Daily mean °F (°C)	−3.6 (−19.8)	2.5 (−16.4)	10.9 (−11.7)	30.4 (−0.9)	47.2 (8.4)	57.9 (14.4)	59.9 (15.5)	54.4 (12.4)	44.0 (6.7)	26.7 (−2.9)	7.1 (−13.8)	−1.4 (−18.6)	28.0 (−2.2)
Mean daily minimum °F (°C)	−10.3 (−23.5)	−4.6 (−20.3)	1.3 (−17.1)	20.2 (−6.6)	37.0 (2.8)	47.8 (8.8)	50.8 (10.4)	46.3 (7.9)	36.6 (2.6)	21.2 (−6.0)	1.0 (−17.2)	−7.5 (−21.9)	20.0 (−6.7)
Mean minimum °F (°C)	−37.5 (−38.6)	−27.4 (−33.0)	−21.9 (−29.9)	0.9 (−17.3)	24.1 (−4.4)	38.6 (3.7)	42.6 (5.9)	36.6 (2.6)	26.1 (−3.3)	6.3 (−14.3)	−17.8 (−27.7)	−29.2 (−34.0)	−40.8 (−40.4)
Record low °F (°C)	−66 (−54)	−62 (−52)	−44 (−42)	−38 (−39)	−8 (−22)	31 (−1)	34 (1)	25 (−4)	9 (−13)	−21 (−29)	−48 (−44)	−62 (−52)	−66 (−54)
Average precipitation inches (mm)	0.66 (17)	0.51 (13)	0.35 (8.9)	0.31 (7.9)	0.64 (16)	2.21 (56)	2.64 (67)	3.15 (80)	1.63 (41)	0.95 (24)	0.83 (21)	0.61 (15)	14.49 (366.8)
Average snowfall inches (cm)	8.2 (21)	6.7 (17)	3.4 (8.6)	3.7 (9.4)	0.7 (1.8)	0.0 (0.0)	0.0 (0.0)	0.0 (0.0)	1.5 (3.8)	6.9 (18)	13.2 (34)	9.6 (24)	53.9 (137.6)
Average precipitation days (≥ 0.01 in)	6.7	6.1	4.9	3.5	6.0	13.4	18.1	18.4	13.8	9.2	9.7	7.7	117.5
Average snowy days (≥ 0.1 in)	6.9	6.7	5.1	2.4	0.7	0.0	0.0	0.0	0.9	5.9	9.7	8.6	46.9
Source 1: NOAA
Source 2: XMACIS2

== Demographics ==
Historical population
Census	Pop.	Note	%±
1950	60		—
1960	34		−43.3%
1990	32		—
2000	32		0.0%
2010	13		−59.4%
2020	30		130.8%
U.S. Decennial Census

Lake Minchumina first appeared as an unincorporated village on the 1950 U.S. Census. It appeared again in 1960, but did not report in 1970 or 1980. It returned again in 1990 as a census-designated place (CDP).

As of the census of 2000, there were 32 people, 16 households, and 9 families residing in the CDP. The population density was 0.1 inhabitants per square mile (0.039/km^{2}). There were 41 housing units at an average density of 0.2 per square mile (0.077/km^{2}). The racial makeup of the CDP was 84.38% White, 3.12% Native American, and 12.50% from two or more races. 6.25% of the population were Hispanic or Latino of any race.

There were 16 households, out of which 25.0% had children under the age of 18 living with them, 50.0% were married couples living together, 6.3% had a female householder with no husband present, and 43.8% were non-families. 37.5% of all households were made up of individuals, and 6.3% had someone living alone who was 65 years of age or older. The average household size was 2.00 and the average family size was 2.67.

In the CDP, the age distribution of the population shows 18.8% under the age of 18, 6.3% from 18 to 24, 40.6% from 25 to 44, 31.3% from 45 to 64, and 3.1% who were 65 years of age or older. The median age was 36 years. For every 100 females, there were 113.3 males. For every 100 females age 18 and over, there were 116.7 males.

The median income for a household in the CDP was $36,250, and the median income for a family was $33,750. Males had a median income of $26,250 versus $0 for females. The per capita income for the CDP was $26,781. None of the population and none of the families were below the poverty line.

== Education ==
It was previously served by the Minchumina School of the Iditarod Area School District.
