= Nikolai, Alaska =

Nikolai Edze Dochak'
- City
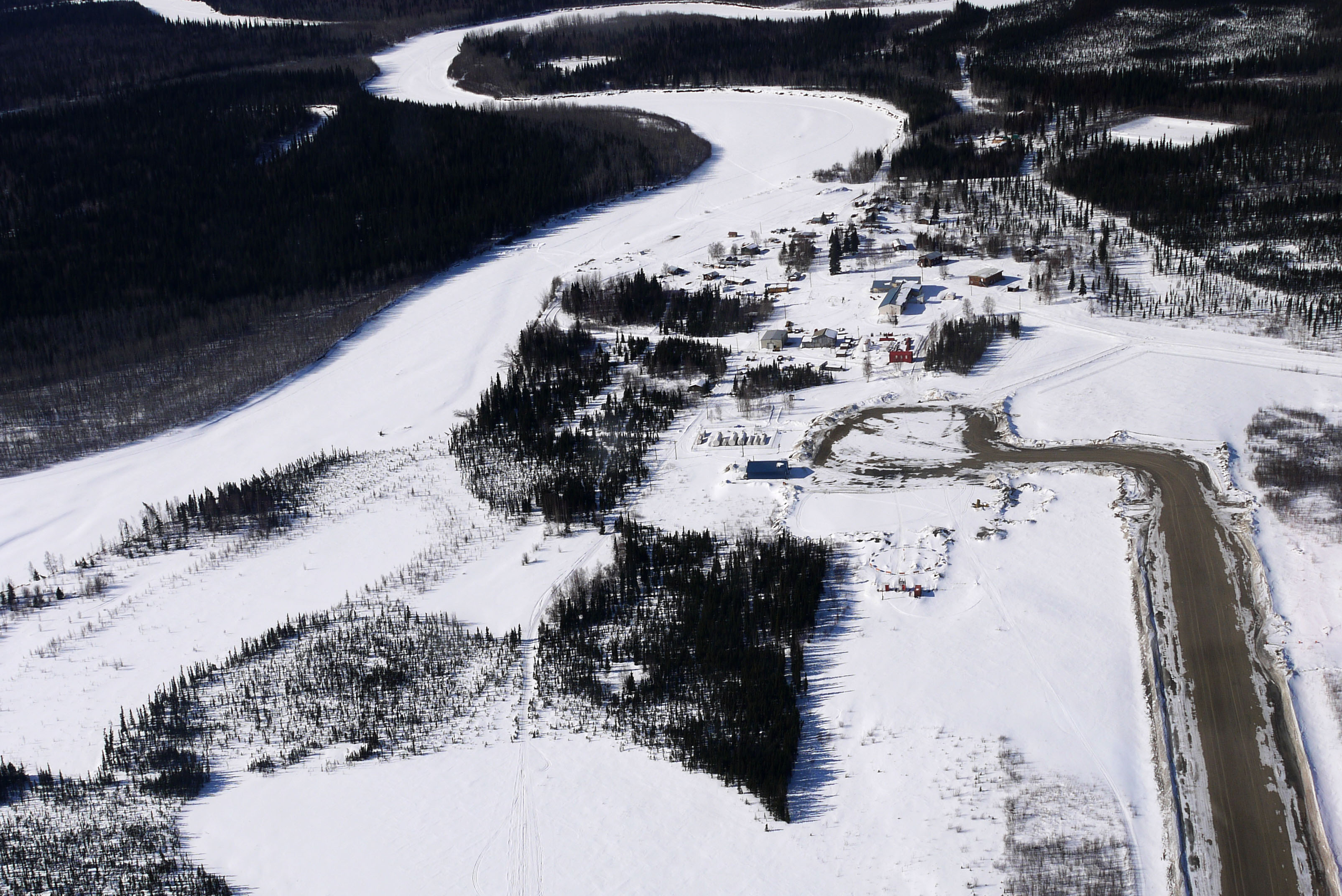
- Aerial view of Nikolai

- Location in Alaska
- Coordinates: 63°0′39″N 154°23′2″W
- Country: United States
- State: Alaska
- Census Area: Yukon-Koyukuk
- Incorporated: July 9, 1970

Government
  - Mayor: Tasiana John
  - State senator: Click Bishop (R)
  - State rep.: Mike Cronk (R)

Area
  - Total: 4.70 sq mi (12.17 km^{2})
  - Land: 4.39 sq mi (11.37 km^{2})
  - Water: 0.31 sq mi (0.81 km^{2})
- Elevation: 430 ft (130 m)

Population (2020)
  - Total: 89
  - Density: 20.3/sq mi (7.83/km^{2})
- Time zone: UTC-9 (Alaska (AKST))
  - Summer (DST): UTC-8 (AKDT)
- ZIP code: 99691
- Area code: 907
- FIPS code: 02-54150
- GNIS feature ID: 1407022

Nikolai (Edze Dochak' in Upper Kuskokwim) is a city in Yukon-Koyukuk Census Area, Alaska, United States. As of the 2020 census, Nikolai had a population of 89.

== History ==
The indigenous people of Nikolai, the Dina’ena, also referred to as Dichinanek’ Hwt’ana or Dikinanek Hut’ana, were nomads.

Nikolai was established around 1910. That year, the first council was organized in the city by the Russian Orthodox Church. The modern-day city was established after 1918.

The city was officially incorporated on July 9, 1970.

== Geography ==
Nikolai is located at 63°0′39″N 154°23′2″W (63.010838, -154.383895).

According to the United States Census Bureau, the city has a total area of 4.9 square miles (13 km^{2}), of which, 4.5 square miles (12 km^{2}) of it is land and 0.3 square miles (0.78 km^{2}) of it (7.17%) is water.

=== Climate ===
Farewell Lake is a weather station roughly 38 miles south of Nikolai, at an elevation of 1060 ft (323.1 m). Farewell Lake has a subarctic climate (Köppen Dfc).

Climate data for Farewell Lake, Alaska, 1991-2020 normals, 1985-2009 extremes: 1060ft (323m)
Month	Jan	Feb	Mar	Apr	May	Jun	Jul	Aug	Sep	Oct	Nov	Dec	Year
Record high °F (°C)	49 (9)	50 (10)	53 (12)	70 (21)	82 (28)	88 (31)	85 (29)	83 (28)	77 (25)	60 (16)	56 (13)	51 (11)	88 (31)
Mean maximum °F (°C)	41.8 (5.4)	44.2 (6.8)	46.3 (7.9)	57.9 (14.4)	71.1 (21.7)	79.6 (26.4)	81.3 (27.4)	74.7 (23.7)	66.5 (19.2)	53.7 (12.1)	43.1 (6.2)	42.4 (5.8)	79.2 (26.2)
Mean daily maximum °F (°C)	8.6 (−13.0)	21.1 (−6.1)	28.2 (−2.1)	44.7 (7.1)	58.6 (14.8)	67.6 (19.8)	69.6 (20.9)	65.0 (18.3)	55.8 (13.2)	38.3 (3.5)	20.4 (−6.4)	12.9 (−10.6)	40.9 (5.0)
Daily mean °F (°C)	−1.8 (−18.8)	9.0 (−12.8)	14.2 (−9.9)	33.2 (0.7)	46.2 (7.9)	55.1 (12.8)	58.9 (14.9)	54.7 (12.6)	45.5 (7.5)	28.7 (−1.8)	10.3 (−12.1)	3.1 (−16.1)	29.8 (−1.3)
Mean daily minimum °F (°C)	−12.2 (−24.6)	−3.1 (−19.5)	0.2 (−17.7)	21.6 (−5.8)	33.8 (1.0)	42.6 (5.9)	48.3 (9.1)	44.5 (6.9)	35.2 (1.8)	19.1 (−7.2)	0.1 (−17.7)	−6.8 (−21.6)	18.6 (−7.4)
Mean minimum °F (°C)	−47.1 (−43.9)	−38.4 (−39.1)	−30.8 (−34.9)	−7.9 (−22.2)	19.3 (−7.1)	31.7 (−0.2)	36.9 (2.7)	29.1 (−1.6)	15.1 (−9.4)	−10.9 (−23.8)	−30.6 (−34.8)	−39.8 (−39.9)	−47.4 (−44.1)
Record low °F (°C)	−71 (−57)	−59 (−51)	−50 (−46)	−34 (−37)	−4 (−20)	25 (−4)	31 (−1)	16 (−9)	−2 (−19)	−32 (−36)	−52 (−47)	−53 (−47)	−71 (−57)
Average precipitation inches (mm)	0.79 (20)	0.53 (13)	0.35 (8.9)	0.77 (20)	1.04 (26)	1.66 (42)	2.60 (66)	2.86 (73)	2.51 (64)	2.23 (57)	1.33 (34)	0.68 (17)	17.35 (440.9)
Average snowfall inches (cm)	9.1 (23)	7.6 (19)	5.4 (14)	4.7 (12)	1.7 (4.3)	0.0 (0.0)	0.0 (0.0)	0.0 (0.0)	1.9 (4.8)	11.8 (30)	12.4 (31)	10.6 (27)	65.2 (165.1)
Average precipitation days (≥ 0.01 in)	4.9	4.2	4.0	3.1	5.9	9.3	12.1	13.4	11.5	7.1	7.9	6.5	89.9
Average snowy days (≥ 0.1 in)	5.7	4.8	4.4	3.0	0.8	0.0	0.0	0.0	0.6	6.0	8.4	7.2	40.9
Source 1: NOAA (1981-2010 precip/snowfall)
Source 2: XMACIS2 (records & 1985-2009 monthly max/mins)

== Demographics ==
Historical population
Census	Pop.	Note	%±
1950	88		—
1960	85		−3.4%
1970	112		31.8%
1980	91		−18.7%
1990	109		19.8%
2000	100		−8.3%
2010	94		−6.0%
2020	89		−5.3%
U.S. Decennial Census

Nikolai first appeared on the 1950 U.S. Census as an unincorporated village. It formally incorporated in 1970.

=== 2020 census ===
As of the 2020 census, Nikolai had a population of 89. The median age was 35.8 years. 18.0% of residents were under the age of 18 and 10.1% of residents were 65 years of age or older. For every 100 females there were 102.3 males, and for every 100 females age 18 and over there were 108.6 males age 18 and over.

0.0% of residents lived in urban areas, while 100.0% lived in rural areas.

There were 39 households in Nikolai, of which 43.6% had children under the age of 18 living in them. Of all households, 46.2% were married-couple households, 17.9% were households with a male householder and no spouse or partner present, and 28.2% were households with a female householder and no spouse or partner present. About 28.2% of all households were made up of individuals and 12.9% had someone living alone who was 65 years of age or older.

There were 45 housing units, of which 13.3% were vacant. The homeowner vacancy rate was 0.0% and the rental vacancy rate was 22.2%.

Racial composition as of the 2020 census
Race	Number	Percent
White	11	12.4%
Black or African American	0	0.0%
American Indian and Alaska Native	72	80.9%
Asian	0	0.0%
Native Hawaiian and Other Pacific Islander	0	0.0%
Some other race	0	0.0%
Two or more races	6	6.7%
Hispanic or Latino (of any race)	2	2.2%

=== 2000 census ===
As of the census of 2000, there were 100 people, 40 households, and 23 families residing in the city. The population density was 22.1 inhabitants per square mile (8.5/km^{2}). There were 47 housing units at an average density of 10.4 per square mile (4.0/km^{2}). The racial makeup of the city was 19% White and 81% Native American.

There were 40 households, out of which 27.5% had children under the age of 18 living with them, 37.5% were married couples living together, 7.5% had a female householder with no husband present, and 42.5% were non-families. 42.5% of all households were made up of individuals, and 7.5% had someone living alone who was 65 years of age or older. The average household size was 2.50 and the average family size was 3.35.

In the city, the age distribution of the population shows 27.0% under the age of 18, 6.0% from 18 to 24, 24.0% from 25 to 44, 26.0% from 45 to 64, and 17.0% who were 65 years of age or older. The median age was 40 years. For every 100 females, there were 194.1 males. For every 100 females age 18 and over, there were 160.7 males.

The median income for a household in the city was $15,000, and the median income for a family was $15,417. The per capita income for the city was $11,029. There were 21.1% of families and 27.6% of the population living below the poverty line, including 22.2% of under eighteens and 15.8% of those over 64.

== Education ==
The Iditarod Area School District operates the Top of the Kuskokwim School in Nikolai.
