= David Salmon (tribal chief) =

- Born: 1912; Salmon Village, Alaska
- Died: October 11, 2007 (aged 94–95); Chalkyitsik, Alaska, US
- Occupations: Episcopalian priest First Traditional Chief; Chief of Chalkyitsik

Chief David Salmon (1912 – October 11, 2007) was an Indigenous Alaskan that served as Chief of Chalkyitsik and later First Traditional Chief for the Gwich'in people. He was known for his commitment to improving his community and working for the people. Salmon would use his position and influence as chief to begin many public works and create programs dedicated to helping the Gwich'in people. As an advocate for education, Salmon would spread his knowledge by creating traditional Athabascan items for display or teaching his community to keep Athabascan traditions alive. At the same time, Chief Salmon would be trained and become the first Episcopal priest for Interior Alaska and spend a lot of his life spreading his faith.

== Early life ==
David Salmon was born in 1912 in Salmon Village, which was located in the Salmon Fork of the Black River in eastern Alaska. David's father, William Salmon, founded the village in 1901. William would take his son and David's stepmom out of the community after the death of his mother, Alice Salmon, at the age of nine to escape a tuberculosis epidemic. Being unable to financially provide for his son, William would send him to an Episcopal boarding school in Fort Yukon from 1924 to 1925, where he would gain an appreciation for education and the episcopal faith.

Being unable to provide for his son financially, William would send him to an Episcopal boarding school in Fort Yukon from 1924 to 1925, where he would gain an appreciation for education and the episcopal faith. After finishing his formal education, David worked with his father on his trap line, where he lived in a cabin his father built near Grayling River. David would pursue education through either books or people teaching him practical or conceptual knowledge despite finishing his education. David would improve his English, learn about many cultures, and obtain tool/weapon-making skills through this method. William would teach his son Athabascan history and culture with the intention of making him the Traditional Chief. Due to his experience, David would learn traditional Athabascan tool makings, such as bow and canoe making. David would later credit his father's instruction for teaching him the importance of education and community.

With his wife, Sarah, Salmon would return to Chalkyitsik after spending 18 years with his father in the wildness.

== Position of chief ==
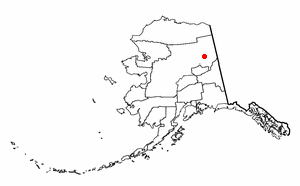
Location of Chalkyitsik, Alaska

At the age of 29, David Salmon became the Chief of Chalkyitsik, a position where he would use his influence and personal skills to improve his community. Salmon would begin the construction of many public works. He would be responsible for creating a store, a school, and a church in Chalkyitsik. Salmon would personally bring the logs required for the school and church. Later, he would be responsible for introducing the first Christmas tree and potlatch to the community of Chalkyitsik.

Following the death of the previous chief, Chief Peter John of Old Minto, David Salmon was chosen for the position of First Traditional Chief for the Athabascan people of the Interior in 2004. Though only honorary and nonpolitical, the position gave Salmon respect from the Athabascan and other indigenous Alaskan groups as the position is held in high regard.

== Contributions ==
David Salmon would be responsible for the foundations of many programs. He would be a founding member of the Tanana Chiefs Conference (TCC), a program dedicated to handling the health and social services of Tribal members and beneficiaries and the Denakkanaaga. This non-profit elder organization addresses the issues of Indigenous Elders.

Due to his childhood, Chief Salmon would be an advocate for education and practical skills, which would encourage him to make personal efforts to spread this to his community. As his father did to him, he would teach the Gwich'in people traditional hunting tools and lifestyles. Salmon saw this teaching as a way to preserve the knowledge that would be lost to time. With his tool-making skills, he would create many pre-contact canoes and tools displayed in many places, such as the University of Alaska Fairbanks.

He would begin a collection of Athabascan artifacts and present them at the annual Tanana Chief Conference in Fairbanks on March 19, 1995. He would sell his collection to the Native regional corporation Doyon Ltd. in Fairbank in 2002.

Salmon would cooperate with anthropologist Thomas O’Brien to create a book full of his knowledge Gwich’in Athabascan survival skills, tool making, and culture. In 1997, O’Brien would publish the book Athabaskan implements from the skin house days as related by Reverend David Salmon and then in 2011, published another book called Gwich'in Athabascan Implements: History, Manufacture, and Usage According to Reverend David Salmon. These books would contain personal parts of Salmon's life that explain where his education and survival skills.

== Personal faith and beliefs ==
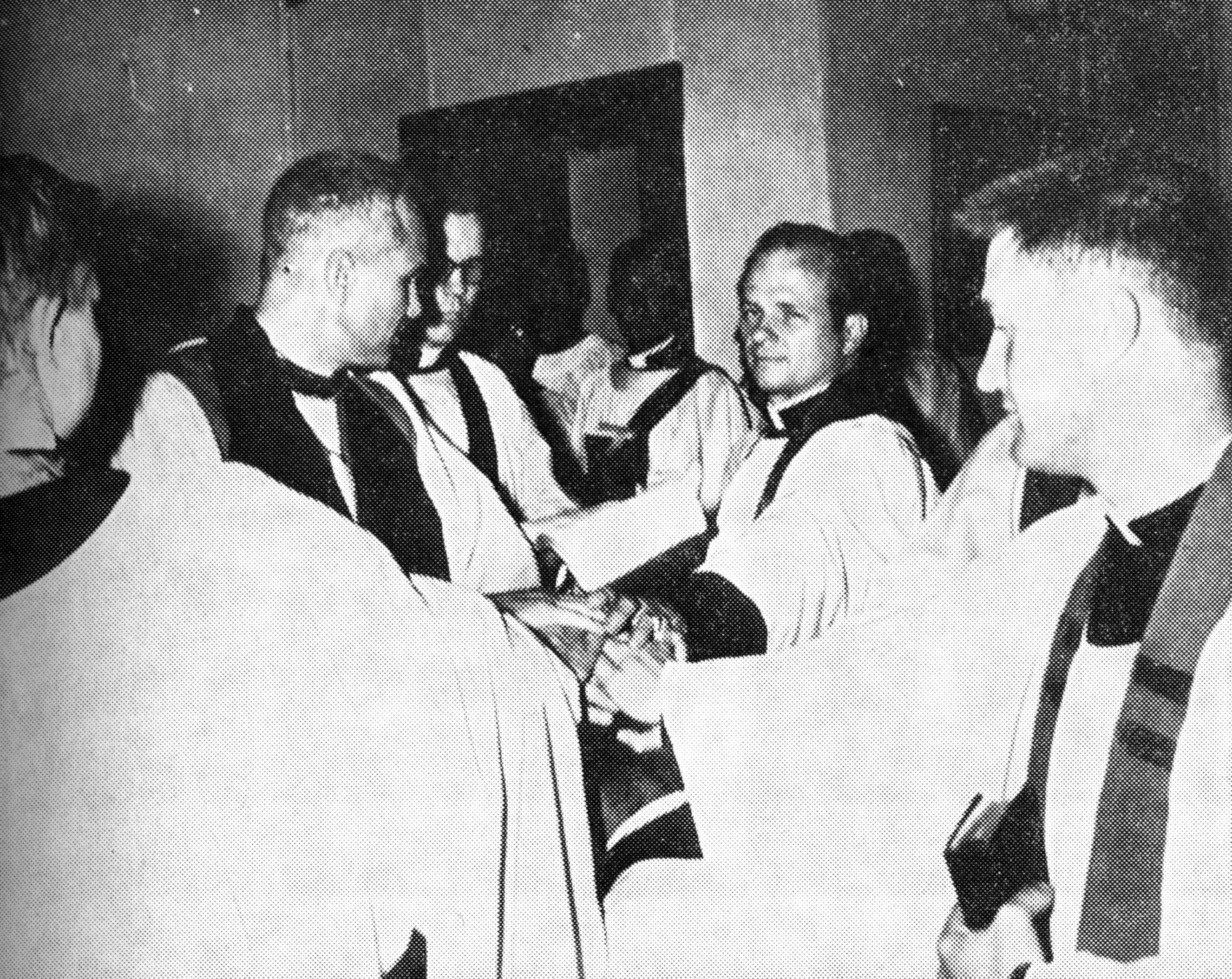
Laying on of hands, led by Bishop William Gordon, during Salmon's ordination to the priesthood in Fort Yukon on October 6, 1962.

After leaving the Episcopal School in his childhood, David would maintain his faith and be responsible for creating a church in Fort Yukon. He would go to Michigan and New York to attend Bible schools, where he received training and improved his English. He would be ordained as a Deacon on May 28, 1958. In 1962, Salmon would be appointed as the first official ordained Athabascan priest for Interior Alaska.

After this, David would spend four years traveling to hold services with other clergymen and women, and then another five years to preach but in his own language before going back to Fort Yukon to preach for three years. After spending two years in Arizona to attend college, David would return to Chalkyitsik to preach for nine years. He would also minister and host multiple revivals a year in Chalkyitsik.

In his later years, Salmon would still be active in activities relating to his faith. This would include attending church services, having daily bible studies in his home, and be invited to revivals.

During his time as an Episcopalian priest, Salmon would use an ancient Athabaskan teaching technique where the hand signals and fingers would represent aspects of church and faith. From the thumb to the finger, the fingers would represent the Apostle-Bishop, the spiritual gift of prophecy, an evangelist, the pastor, and the teacher respectively. Salmon utilized this technique to show people how everyone had a purpose given by God.

During his time as First Traditional Chief, he would state how he believed the disregard of Indian Law and Leadership correlated with the social issues the Indigenous people are facing. Additionally, he would credit his achievement to God and called himself the servant to both God and the people of Chalkyitsik. Calling himself a slave Indian, Salmon would use this mindset when working to improve the community of Chalkyitsik.

Due to the impact of education on his life, he was recorded stating how Indians require education to be successful.

== Awards and tributes ==
Due to his contributions and being a role model for Alaskans, Salmon was awarded an honorary doctorate from the University of Alaska Fairbanks in 2002.

In 2005, David Salmon would have a children's story based on his, called Alaska's Little Chief. Created by Judy Ferguson, the story revolves around a young David interacting with various animals from the Arctic National Wildlife Refuge. Following his death, the Tanana Chiefs Conference would name one of their Fairbanks tribal Halls after David Salmon: David Salmon Tribal Hall.

== Family ==
During his time in the wilderness with his father, David learn about his grandfather and his brother, who were supposedly eight feet strong, yet kind giants. His grandfather was named King Salmon (or Luk Choo), after the strong fish in the river, while his brother was named Bull Moose for similar reasons. King Salmon would be responsible for building a fur trading post Fort Yukon in 1847 after contact with white men and worked for the Hudson's Bay Company from 1850 to 1868. King Moose would die in 1898 at 90 years old.

David's father, William Salmon, was born around 1858 and 1860 in a region of the Chandalar River drainage and would work for Hudson's Bay Company like his father. William would die in 1951.

David Salmon would be married to Sarah Salmon for 59 years before her death. She would be there with him during all his travels as a priest and as Chief. They would have one son, William Salmon, and one adopted daughter, Sarah Henry, as well as five grandchildren and 12 great-grandchildren. One of his grandsons, Woodie Salmon, would go on to serve as Alaska state representative from January 10, 2005 to January 17, 2011.

== Death ==
Diagnosed in the summer of 2007 with cancer, Salmon would live to the age of 95. He died in his home in Chalkyitsik on October 11, 2007. He was scheduled as a guest speaker to the opening of the 2007 Alaska Federation of Natives convention, 10 days after his death. His successor, Don Honea Sr., would replace Salmon as speaker.

Due to his history as an Episcopalian priest, his funeral at St. Christopher Episcopal Church would have a mix of Athabascan and Christian traditions. As a sign of memorial, Alaska governor Sarah Palin ordered that all Alaskan flags be lowered to half-staff and commenting how Alaska had lost a respectable figure.

After his death, the Salmon family received about many calls of condolences from throughout Alaska and the United States. Five days after his death (October 15, 2007), he would be buried near his home in Chalkyitsik, next to his wife in a cemetery.
