= John Fredson =

Alaskan Native leader

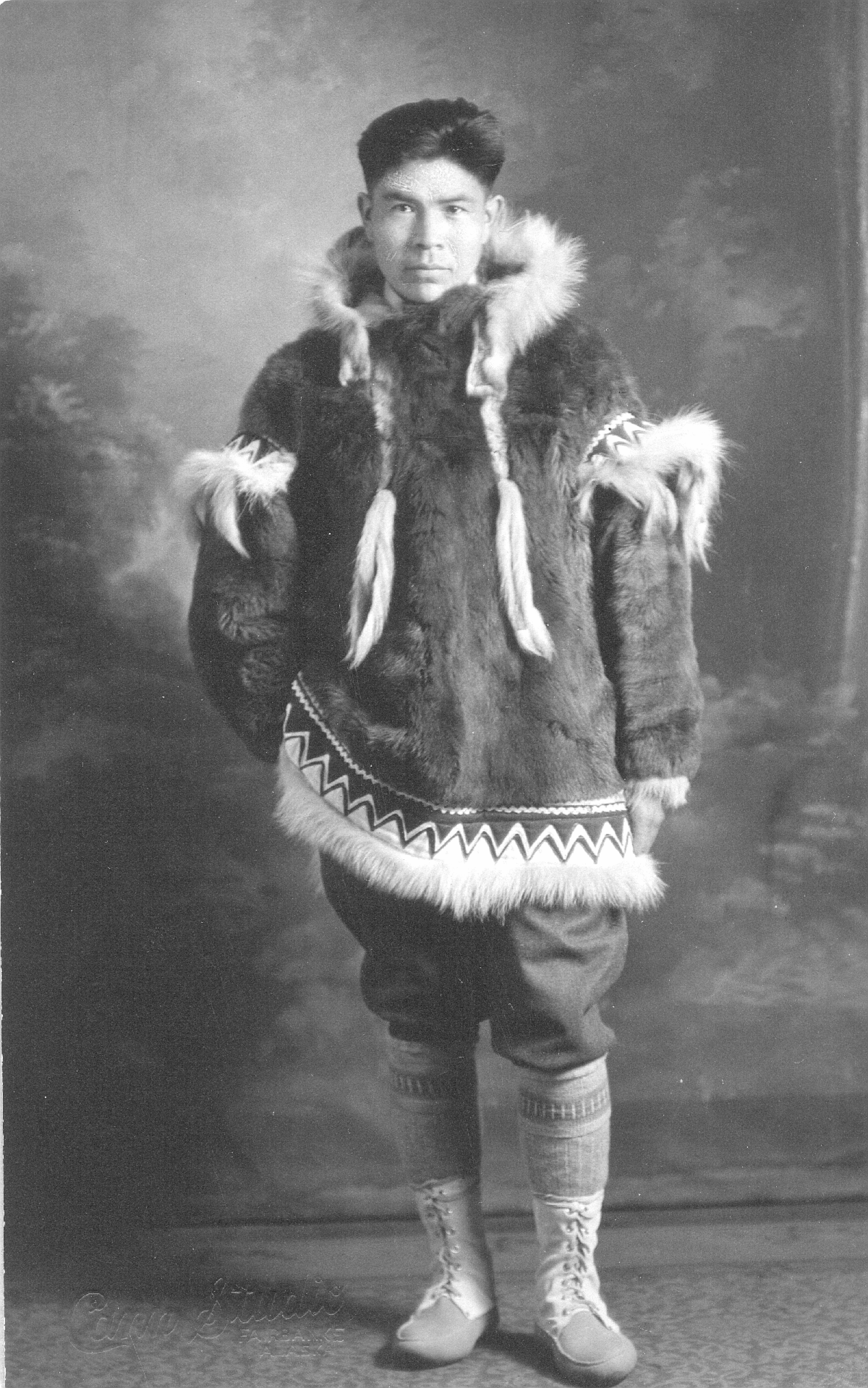
John Fredson circa 1913

John Fredson (born 1896, as Neetsaii Gwich'in – August 22, 1945), was a tribal leader born near Table Mountain in the Sheenjek River watershed of the state of Alaska, United States. He is most noted for gaining federal recognition for the Venetie Indian Reserve in 1941, then the largest Indian Trust Land reservation in Alaska, and containing approximately 1.4 million acres (5,700 km^{2}). This was before Alaska was admitted as a state.

As a youth, Fredson had taken part in Hudson Stuck's expedition to climb Denali, and served as base camp manager. Afterward Stuck sponsored him for college, and he attended Sewanee, The University of the South, becoming the first Alaska Native to graduate from college. Fredson returned to Alaska, where he worked in a hospital and as a teacher, becoming a leader and political activist.

== Early life and education ==
Born in 1896 to a Gwich'in family near Table Mountain in what is now designated as Yukon-Koyukuk Census Area, Alaska, John Fredson grew up speaking Gwich'in as his first language. Orphaned at a young age, he attended a mission school operated by the Episcopal Church of the United States, where he learned English. From an early age, he became highly skilled in following trails, climbing and hunting.

At the age of 16, Fredson was part of the 1913 climbing expedition of Hudson Stuck, Episcopal Archdeacon of the Yukon, who led the party that ascended Denali, the highest peak in North America. Fredson was the base camp manager. His role is documented in Stuck's book, Ascent of Denali (reprint 2005). Fredson stayed at base at camp for 31 days by himself, hunting caribou and Dall sheep, while awaiting the return of the climbing party. He saved his ration of sugar for their return.

With Stuck's encouragement, Fredson gained more formal education, becoming the first native of Athabascan descent to complete high school. He attended Sewanee, The University of the South, an Episcopal college in Middle Tennessee, and was the first Alaska Native to graduate from a university.

While there, Fredson worked with Edward Sapir, a noted linguist, and helped to classify Gwich'in within the Na-Dene language family. This work is documented in the book John Fredson Edward Sapir Ha'a Googwandak (1982), a collection of stories that Fredson told to Sapir. His work on communicating Gwich'in concepts of space and time may have also influenced Sapir's later work that established the Sapir–Whorf hypothesis.

== Life's work ==
After his return to Alaska, Fredson worked at a hospital in Fort Yukon. In his later years, Fredson built a solarium for tuberculosis patients at the hospital. Then the only hospital in the far north, the facility was often overwhelmed by Alaska Native patients, primarily Gwich’in. They needed treatment for Eurasian infectious diseases, to which they had no immunity.

Fredson taught school in the village of Venetie, and taught the community how to grow gardens. He was assisted by Chief Johnny Frank, a notable medicine man and storyteller among the Gwich'in. The chief's exploits are recounted in the book Neerihiinjik: We Traveled From Place to Place (2012).

Fredson became a tribal leader, working to re-establish his people's rights to their traditional lands. He was the primary founder of the Venetie Indian Reserve, the largest reservation in Alaska. It achieved federal recognition in 1941, before Alaska was admitted as a state. The Reserve was approximately 1.4 million acres (5,700 km^{2}) when it was established.

== Family life ==
John married Jean Ribaloff, a woman whom he met while at the hospital in Fort Yukon. They had three children, William Burke Fredson, Virginia Fredson (Dows), and Lula Fredson (Young). Fredson died of pneumonia at about age 49 on August 22, 1945.
