= Hannah Solomon =

Hannah Solomon may refer to:

- Hannah G. Solomon (1858–1942), American social reformer
- Hannah Paul Solomon (1908–2011), American community leader and artist
