= Lewis Parker =

Lewis Parker may refer to:

- Lewis Parker (artist) (1926–2011), Canadian artist and children's book illustrator
- Lewis Parker (politician) (1928–2011), American politician of the Virginia House of Delegates, 1972–1993
- Lewis Parker (musician) (born 1977), British hip-hop artist

== See also ==
- Lew Parker (1910–1972), American actor
- Louis N. Parker, English dramatist, composer and translator
