= Sarah James (disambiguation) =

Sarah James (born 1946) is an environmental activist.

Sarah James may also refer to:

- Sarah Beth James (born 1989), American beauty pageant titleholder
- Sarah James (The 4400), 4400 character

== See also ==
- Sara James (born 2008), Polish singer and songwriter
