= Sahneuti =

Sahneuti (also spelled Shahnyaati, Sahnyateh, Sanytyi, Senati, Sinate), died c.1900 was a Gwichyaa Gwichʼin chief and a fur trader.

After the establishment of the Hudson's Bay Company trading post at Fort Yukon in 1847, Alexander Hunter Murray appointed him Chief Trader. Following the expulsion of the Hudson's Bay Company from Fort Yukon in 1869 after the Alaska Purchase, he attempted to trade with the Americans, but dissatisfaction led him to lead a raid on Fort Yukon. Eventually, the Alaska Commercial Company put him in charge of their trade at Fort Yukon. Nevertheless, he kept good relations with the Hudson's Bay Company, playing off the two companies to ensure maximum advantage for his people.

He is the namesake of Senati, Alaska (65.266°N 151.183°W), an area of the middle Yukon River that was settled by the Gwichyaa Gwich’in.
