= Jonathon Solomon =

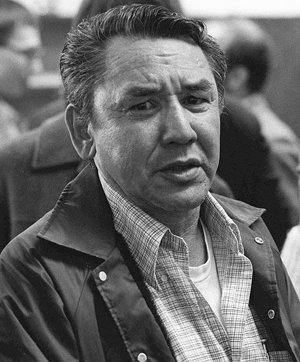
- Born: March 10, 1932; Fort Yukon, Alaska
- Died: July 13, 2006 (aged 74); Anchorage, Alaska
- Citizenship: American, native Gwich'in
- Spouse: Hannah J. Solomon (m. 1956)
- Parent: Hannah Paul Solomon
- Awards: Goldman Environmental Prize (2002)

Jonathon Paul Solomon Sr. (March 10, 1932 – July 13, 2006) was a native Gwich'in from Fort Yukon, Alaska, USA, and a member of the U.S. delegation to the International Porcupine Caribou Agreement between Canada and U.S. He served as the Traditional Chief of the Gwichyaa Zhee Gwich'in, a lifetime designation, from 2002 until his death in 2006. He was a founding member of the Gwich'in Steering Committee formed by the Gwich'in at Arctic Village (Vashraii K'oo) in 1988, and dedicated to the preservation of the Porcupine Caribou Herd. He served with distinction until his death.

He was awarded the Goldman Environmental Prize in 2002, together with Norma Kassi and Sarah James. They received the prize for their struggles for protection of the Arctic National Wildlife Refuge from plans of oil exploration and drilling. Oil and gas exploration would disturb the life cycle of the Porcupine caribou, which has been a foundation for the Gwich'in culture for 20,000 years.

He founded the Gwichyaa Gwich'in Ginkhe', a non-profit organization in Fort Yukon in 1970, also known as the "three G's". The organization was dedicated to fighting the environmental destruction of the Yukon Flats, specifically the proposed Rampart Dam project which would have flooded the entire Yukon Flats and thus forcing the dislocation of the Gwich'in people. The project was halted.
