= Gwichyaa Gwichʼin =

Regions with significant populations
- Yukon Flats, Alaska, USA

Languages
- Gwichʼin, English

Related ethnic groups
- Gwich'in

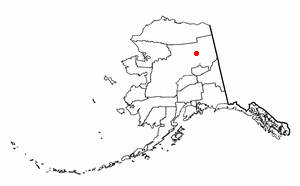
Location of Fort Yukon, Alaska.

Gwichyaa Gwichʼin (alternate spelling: Gwich'yaa Gwichʼin or Kutchakutchin, translation: "those who dwell on the Flats") are a Gwich'in people who live in the Yukon Flats area of Alaska, USA. This includes the Fort Yukon (originally "Gwicyaa Zhee"; translation: "house on the Flats") area on both banks of the Yukon River from Birch Creek to Porcupine River;" the Senati area of the middle Yukon River, the namesake of Sahneuti, Gwich'in chief and fur trader; and Venetie.

== Etymology ==
The Gwichyaa Gwichʼin have been known by many other names, including: Eert-kai-lee (1892), Fort Indians, Ik-kil-lin (1892), Itohali (11th Census, Alaska, 1893), It-kagh-lie, It-ka-lyariiin (1877), I't-ka-lyi, Itkpe'lit (1876), Itkpeleit, Itku'dlln, Koo-cha-koo-chin (1866), Kot-a-Kutchin (1874), Kotch-a-Kutchins (1869), Kouehca Kouttohin (1891), KutchaaKuttchin (1865), Kutcha-kutchl (1851), Kutch a Kutchin (1862), Kutchia-Kuttehin (1876), Kutsha-Kutahi (1854), Lowland people (1869), Na-Kotchpo-tsohig-Kouttchin (1891), O-til'-tin (1887), Toukon Louchioux Indians, Yukon Flats Kutchin (1936).

== History ==
The Gwichyaa Gwichʼin are the easternmost of the Gwichʼin groups. In addition to the Kutchakutchin, there were four other main Kutchin groups in the upper Yukon-Porcupine regions: the Han (Hän Hwëch'in) (erroneously as Hankutchin grouped as an Kutchin group, upper Yukon), the Natsikutchin (Chandalar River drainage), the Tranjikutchin (Black River), and the Ventakutchin (Crow River area). Two bands of the main tribe are extinct, the Tatsakutchin of Rampart, Alaska and Tennuthkutchin of Birch Creek.

In 1827, Hudson's Bay Company Chief Factor, Peter Warren Dease gathered information from the Gwichyaa Gwichʼin. They told him that no other tribe but themselves frequent the Peel River and that they come upstream in barges every year as far as Arctic Red River for trade. In 1928, Mooney estimated the 1740 population to be 500.

== Culture ==
Jones described the Kutchakutchin as being split into three clans: Tchitcheah (Chitsa), Tengeratsey (Tangesatsa), and Natsahi (Natesa). At one time, a man was required to marry outside his caste, but eventually the custom fell into disuse. Other former customs included polygamy, slavery, and burning their dead.

Hodge described the Kutchakutchin as being partially nomadic. Their traditional livelihood was based on hunting and trapping. After the introduction of the trading post, the Gwichyaa became traders as well. Their standard of value was the Nakieik, a string of beads 7 ft (2.1 m). A string's value was equivalent to one or more beaver skins.

The dwellings were made of deerskins pieced together over curved poles in the shape of inverted teacups. Men cooked while women performed other tasks. Because they lacked pottery, the Gwichyaa's used other materials such as wood, matting, horns, or bark. Wooden troughs functioned as dishes while horns functioned as drinking pieces. Kettles were obtained from the Hankutchin.

Present-day Gwichyaa Gwichʼin rely on hunting (bear, caribou, moose, waterfowl) and fishing (salmon, whitefish) for subsistence. They make an income from trapping and selling handicrafts.

== Recognition ==
On 4 April 1975 Canada Post issued 'Dance of the Kutcha-Kutchin' in the Indians of Canada, Indians of the Subarctic series. The stamp was designed by Georges Beaupré based on a drawing by Alexander Hunter Murray (1851) in Library and Archives Canada, Ottawa, Ontario. The 8¢ stamps are perforated 13.5 and were printed by Canadian Bank Note Company, Limited.
