= Clarence Alexander =

Native American leader

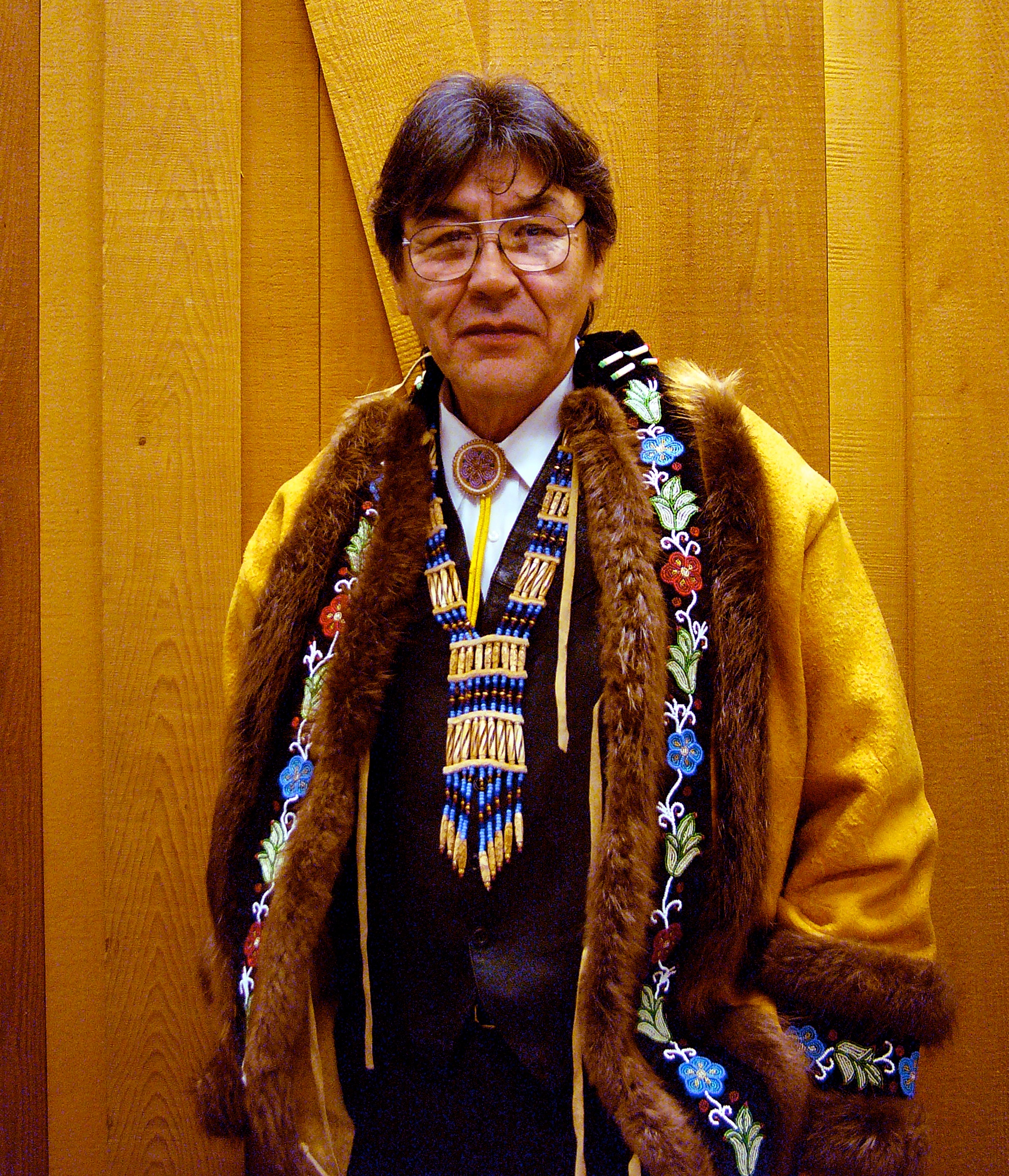
- Alexander in November 2004
- Born: Clarence Lee Alexander; March 12, 1939 (age 86)

Clarence Lee Alexander (born March 12, 1939) is a former Grand Chief of the Gwich'in of Alaska. He was 1st Chief of Fort Yukon from 1980 to 1994. He was raised at "Shoo Taii," the "Happy Hill," which is also known by the name "Alexander Village". Alexander Village is approximately 20 miles north of Fort Yukon. He co-authored the Gwich'in Dictionary with his wife, Virginia E. Alexander.

== Council of Athabascan Tribal Governments ==
He is credited, with Paul Williams Sr. of Beaver, with founding the Council of Athabascan Tribal Governments, known as "CATG".

== Yukon River Inter-Tribal Watershed Council ==
Alexander is credited, along with three others, with founding the Yukon River Inter-Tribal Watershed Council, which consists of 70 Tribes and First Nations spanning the Yukon River Watershed. The organization is dedicated to preserving clean water.

== Awards ==
Clarence Alexander received the 2004 Ecotrust Indigenous Leadership Award, on November 30, 2004, for his many years of work advocating for environmental justice, tribal rights, and protection of the Yukon River Watershed.

Clarence Alexander was awarded the 2011 Presidential Citizens Medal by President Barack Obama on October 20, 2011.

== Sources ==
- www.whitehouse.gov
- https://web.archive.org/web/20111007105612/http://64.38.12.138/News/2006/014953.asp
- http://www.ecotrust.org/indigenousleaders/2004/clarence_alexander.html
- http://www.culturalsurvival.org/publications/cultural-survival-quarterly/canada/view-yukon-flats-interview-gwichin-leader-clarence-a
- https://web.archive.org/web/20110927150744/http://www.tribalgov.pdx.edu/interviews.php
- https://web.archive.org/web/20160916134334/https://sites.google.com/site/mkiemele/thetwo-leggedonesaremissing
- http://www.uaf.edu/anla/collections/search/collectionList.xml?collection=KU&name=Gwich%27in&list=author
- https://web.archive.org/web/20110903140833/http://www.akforum.com/keynotes4.htm
- https://web.archive.org/web/20110721155059/http://www.catg.org/ourstory.html
