= Dihai-kutchin =

Gwichʼin tribe

Diʼhaii Gwichʼin (translation: "Gwichʼin living the farthest away" or "those living farthest downstream") are a small Gwichʼin tribe of the Athabaskan linguistic group. Descendants intermarried with the Neetsʼaii Gwichʼin in Arctic Village, Alaska, USA. Historically they have occupied the north fork of the Chandalar River, and the Middle and South Forks of the Koyukuk River.
