= Georgianna Lincoln =

American politician

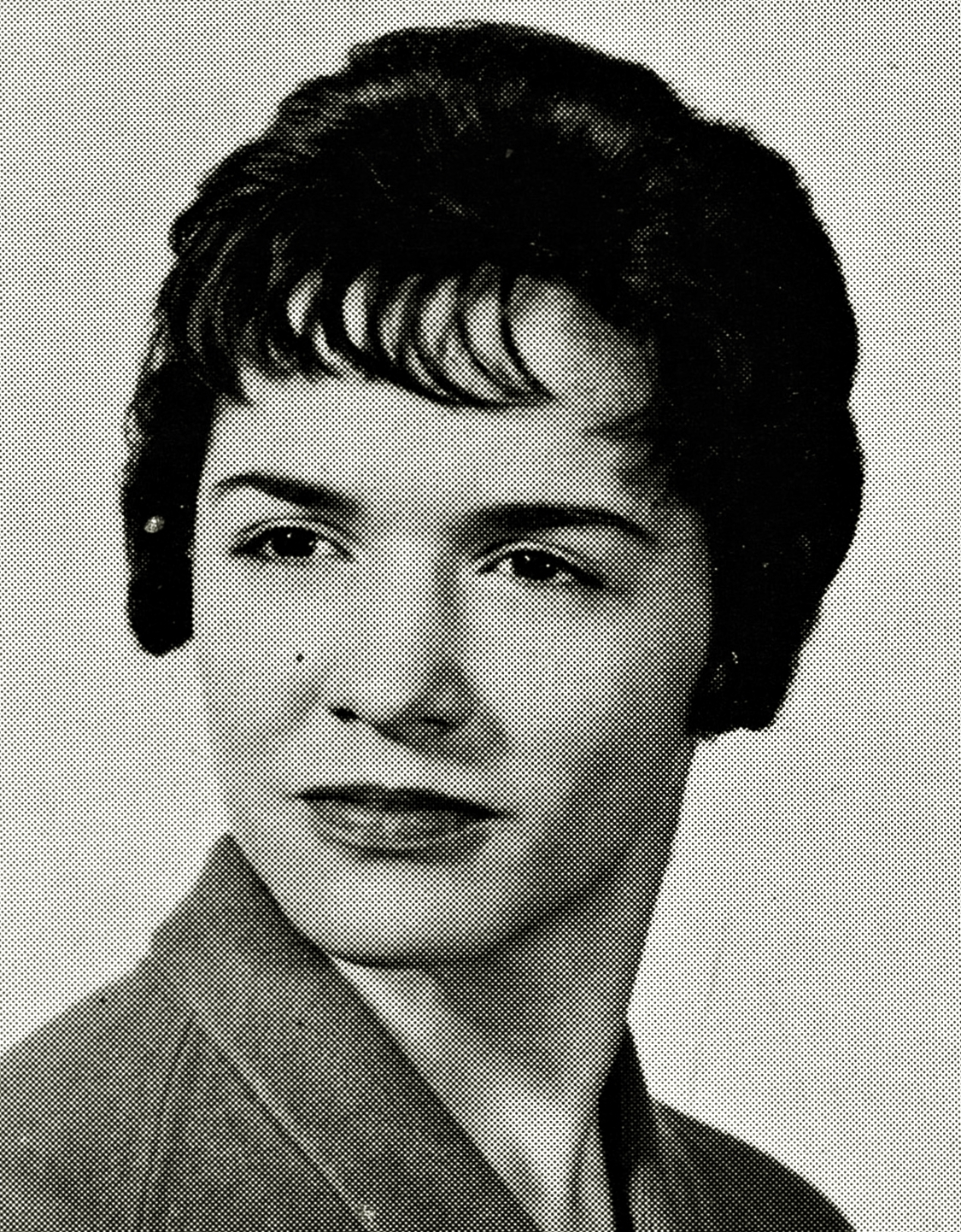
Lincoln, 1960

Georgianna Lincoln (born February 22, 1943) is an American politician and businesswoman.

Born in Fairbanks, Alaska, Lincoln graduated from Lathrop High School in Fairbanks in 1960. She went to University of Alaska Fairbanks. She lived in Fairbanks and in the village of Rampart. Lincoln was involved with the commercial fishing industry and was on the board of directors of the Alaska Native Claims Settlement Actregional corporation, Doyon, Limited. She was a member of the Alaska Commission on Judicial Conduct from 1984 to 1990. Lincoln was in the Alaska House of Representatives in 1991 and 1992. She was in the Alaska Senate from 1993 to 2005, and in 1996 was the Democratic nominee for the United States Congress.

== See also ==
- List of Native American politicians
- Native American women in politics

Alaska House of Representatives
Preceded by F. Kay Wallis	Member of the Alaska House of Representatives from the 24th district 1991–1993	Succeeded by Pete Kott
Alaska Senate
Preceded by District created	Member of the Alaska Senate from R district 1993–2003	Succeeded by Alan Austerman
Preceded by Alan Austerman	Member of the Alaska Senate from C district 2003–2005	Succeeded by Albert Kookesh
