= F. Kay Wallis =

American traditional healer and politician

Member of the Alaska House of Representatives from the 24th district
- In office 1985–1990
- Preceded by: Vernon L. Hurlbert
- Succeeded by: Georgianna Lincoln

Personal details
- Born: c. 1944 Fort Yukon, Alaska, U.S.
- Party: Democratic
- Education: University of Alaska Fairbanks
- Occupation: Traditional healer

Frances Kay Wallis (born c. 1944) is an American (Gwichyaa Gwichʼin) traditional healer and former politician. She is a tribal doctor with the Southcentral Foundation. Wallis was a Democratic member of the Alaska House of Representatives from the 24th district from 1985 to 1990.

== Life ==
Wallis was born c. 1944 in Fort Yukon, Alaska. She was raised in the foster care system. Wallis is a member of the Gwichyaa Zhee Gwich'in Tribe. She earned a B.S. at the University of Alaska Fairbanks.

Wallis has held various roles including being a college recruiter for the Tanana Chiefs Conference, a legislative aide in the Alaska State Legislature, and an advocate for the Gwichyaa Gwich'in Tribal Government. She has also been involved in service organizations like Court Appointed Special Advocates (CASA) and Family Centered Services.

Wallis, a Democrat, was elected a member of the Alaska House of Representatives from the 24th district based in Fort Yukon. In 1985, she succeeded Vernon L. Hurlbert. In the 1980s, she introduced a resolution advocating for the return of Native Alaskan remains from the Smithsonian Institution. The resolution, which successfully passed the Alaska legislature and received the governor's signature, was part of Wallis' broader effort to assist Native Alaskans in reclaiming approximately 6,000 ancestral remains currently held by the Smithsonian. Wallis viewed this legislative achievement as a critical first step in addressing the ongoing repatriation of Indigenous remains. She served until 1990 when she was succeeded by Georgianna Lincoln. Wallis is recognized for her contributions to both state governance and Indigenous advocacy in Alaska.

Wallis is a traditional healer. As of 2023, Wallis is a tribal doctor in the Southcentral Foundation's traditional healing clinic.

== See also ==
- List of Native American politicians
- Native American women in politics

Alaska House of Representatives
Preceded by Vernon L. Hurlbert	Member of the Alaska House of Representatives from the 24th district 1985–1990	Succeeded by Georgianna Lincoln
