= Sarah James =

Neets'aii Gwich'in activist in USA

- Born: 1946 (age 79–80); Fort Yukon, Alaska
- Awards: Goldman Environmental Prize (2002)

Sarah Agnes James (born 1946) is a Neets'aii Gwich'in activist from Arctic Village, Alaska, USA, but was born in Fort Yukon "because that is where the hospital was. I grew up part of the time in Fort Yukon and Salmon River, but most of the time in Arctic Village, Alaska."James is a board member of the International Indian Treaty Council. She was awarded the Goldman Environmental Prize in 2002, together with Jonathon Solomon and Norma Kassi. They received the prize for their efforts to protect the Arctic National Wildlife Refuge (ANWR) from plans of oil exploration and drilling. Oil and gas exploration would disturb the life cycle of the Porcupine caribou, which has been a foundation for the Gwich'in culture since approximately 18,000 BC.

== Politics and lobbying ==
In November 1969, James joined a group of Indigenous students led by Mohawk activist Richard Oakes that occupied the former prison island Alcatraz in San Francisco, CA.

In the 1990s James visited communities in South American countries (Brazil, Ecuador, Nicaragua, and Guatemala), speaking for the underprivileged. She also appeared on television programs (CNN, MacNeil-Lehrer, CBS). And she traveled to Washington, trying to clear up concepts that they believe petroleum companies misrepresent, and speaking for preservation of the Arctic National Wildlife Refuge.

== Background ==
James encourages all of us to “learn from each other and go forward for the Earth, so we can live.” Her mother, father, and grandparents taught her to protect the “Sacred Place Where All Life Begins”, Iizhik Gwats’an Gwandaii Goodiit. The land is her teacher, her medicine, her sustainer, and her way to the Creator. She grew up living off the land and knows the hardships of surviving in the cold north country. Sarah dedicates herself to protecting necessary lifeways, amplifying the voices of her people and beings—especially the caribou. A spokesperson and activist, Sarah travels globally to mobilize many into empathy to protect the Porcupine Caribou herd and, defend their calving grounds from oil development and climate catastrophe. She educates and learns from diverse people, bringing her teachings, and also receiving theirs. Sarah works from her village and remains devoted to passing on the ancestral teaching to younger generations.

== Honors and awards ==
In 1993, James was awarded the Alston Bannerman Fellowship. In 2001 she received the "Leadership for a Changing World" grant awarded for outstanding but little known leaders. In 2002 she was awarded the Goldman Environmental Prize for "grassroots environmentalists along with Jonathon Solomon Sr., and Norma Kassi. She also received the National Conservation Land Trust Award in 2002. In 2004, she received the "Ecotrust Award for Indigenous Leadership", and in 2006 she earned the Alaska Conservation Foundation "Celia Hunter Award for Outstanding Conservations".

== See also ==
- List of Native American politicians
- Native American women in politics
