= Woodie Salmon =

American politician

Member of the Alaska House of Representatives from the 6th district
- In office January 10, 2005 – January 17, 2011
- Preceded by: Carl Morgan
- Succeeded by: Alan S. Dick

Personal details
- Born: Woodie West Salmon; August 13, 1952 (age 74) Fort Yukon, Alaska
- Party: Democratic
- Spouse: Katelyn Englishoe
- Education: University of Alaska
- Profession: Politician, Pilot, Oil Business

Woodie West Salmon (born August 13, 1952) is a Gwich'in Indian who was a member of the Alaska House of Representatives, representing the 6th District from 2005 to 2011. Woodie was born in the small city of Fort Yukon, Alaska, where his career in politics began. He currently resides in the small town of Chalkyitsik, Alaska, with his wife, Katelyn Englishoe, and serves as Chief of the Chalkyitsik Village Council.

== Early life and education ==
Woodie Salmon comes from both Native Alaskan and Canadian heritage. His ancestry is embedded north of the Arctic Circle, in the eastern portion of Alaska, as well as the Yukon province of Canada. His father, William Salmon, was a Native Canadian and member of the Gwich'in, an Athabaskan-speaking tribe that's recognized as a part of the First Nations people of Canada, and also as an Alaskan Native people. Woodie's mother, Minnie Salmon, a Gwich'in Indian, was a lifelong resident of Chalkyitsik, Alaska, where she worked as a bilingual instructor and prevention worker. Woodie's grandfather, David Salmon, was a prominent Alaskan and Yukonian figure that devoted much of his life to education, and also served as a major political advocate for Native American rights and cultural preservation. Despite being born in Fort Yukon, Woodie did a large portion of his schooling in the city of Fairbanks, Alaska. He attended Lathrop High School, a highly-reputable public school, to receive his high school diploma. For college, Salmon attended the University of Alaska, Fairbanks, a public land-grant research university, where he received his degree in electronics in two years.

== Career ==
Before beginning his career in politics, Woodie Salmon worked both the aviation and oil businesses. He was a pilot and air service operator for twenty years, and flying remains to be one of Salmon's favorite hobbies.

== Political career ==
=== Early political career ===
Woodie's inroads to politics began in his birthplace of Fort Yukon, where he served on the Fort Yukon City Council, and was elected to a minimum three-year term. Subsequently, he was elevated to the role of mayor by his fellow council members, serving a minimum one-year term. Following his time on the Fort Yukon City Council, Salmon served as a board member for the Interior Regional Housing Authority, before running for the Alaska House of Representatives in 2004.

=== Alaskan House of Representatives ===
Woodie Salmon, a democrat from Chalkyitsik, served on the Alaska House of Representatives from 2005 to 2010. His platform prioritized educational funding, the reduction of high energy costs, and providing more jobs and increasing safety parameters set in place for rural Alaskans. He served the 96 communities that encapsulated District 6, the largest house district in the United States. In the house, Salmon sat on a host of different committees, including the House Fish and Game Committee, House Transportation Committee, and the House Community and Regional Affairs Committee.

Salmon also participated in a handful of decisions while serving in the House. One of the more notable decisions Salmon voted on was Senate Bill 2001, which would've added an additional 0.011% surcharge on oil and gas purchases. He voted nay on the premise that raising oil and gas prices would make energy even more unaccessible for rural Alaskans. Salmon's decisions on proposed legislation reflect his belief in maintaining abortion rights, growing the Alaskan economy, and expanding educational offerings within the state.

==== Election results ====
2004 Alaska House of Representatives Election, District 6
Party	Candidate	Votes	% of vote
Democratic	Woodie W. Salmon	3048	50.38
Republican	Ward H. Sattler	2980	49.26
Not Affiliated	Write-In	22	0.36

2006 Alaska House of Representatives Election, District 6
Party	Candidate	Votes	% of vote
Democratic	Woodie W. Salmon	2580	51.57
Republican	Carl B. Morgan Jr.	2412	48.21
Not Affiliated	Write-In	11	0.22

2008 Alaska House of Representatives Election, District 6
Party	Candidate	Votes	% of vote
Democratic	Woodie W. Salmon	3303	53.42
Republican	Ward H. Sattler	2847	46.13
Not Affiliated	Write-In	22	0.36

2010 Alaska House of Representatives Election, District 6
Party	Candidate	Votes
Democratic	Woodie W. Salmon	956
Republican	Alan S. Dick	1507

2012 Alaska House of Representatives Election, District 39
Party	Candidate	Votes	% of vote
Democratic	Woodie W. Salmon	1304	72.2
Republican	Neal W. Foster	502	27.8

=== Post-House political appointment ===
Woodie currently serves the community for which he has lived most of his life, as the Chief of the Chalkyitsik Village Council. Chalkyitsik consists of 110 residents, many of whom are Gwich'in, and for centuries, the area has been an important seasonal fishing spot for the tribe during the spring and summer months. However, it wasn't until the 1930s that Chalkyitsik began its development into a year-round community, and beginning in 1941, Woodie's grandfather, David Salmon, served as Chief. The Chalkyitsik Village Council is a part of the Council of Athabascan Tribal Governments, which maintains that Woodie's role as chief it to facilitate economic growth, ensure the welfare of tribal members, preserve Native land holdings, and encourage self-governance among the Gwich'in.
