= Hannah Paul Solomon =

American artist (1908–2011)

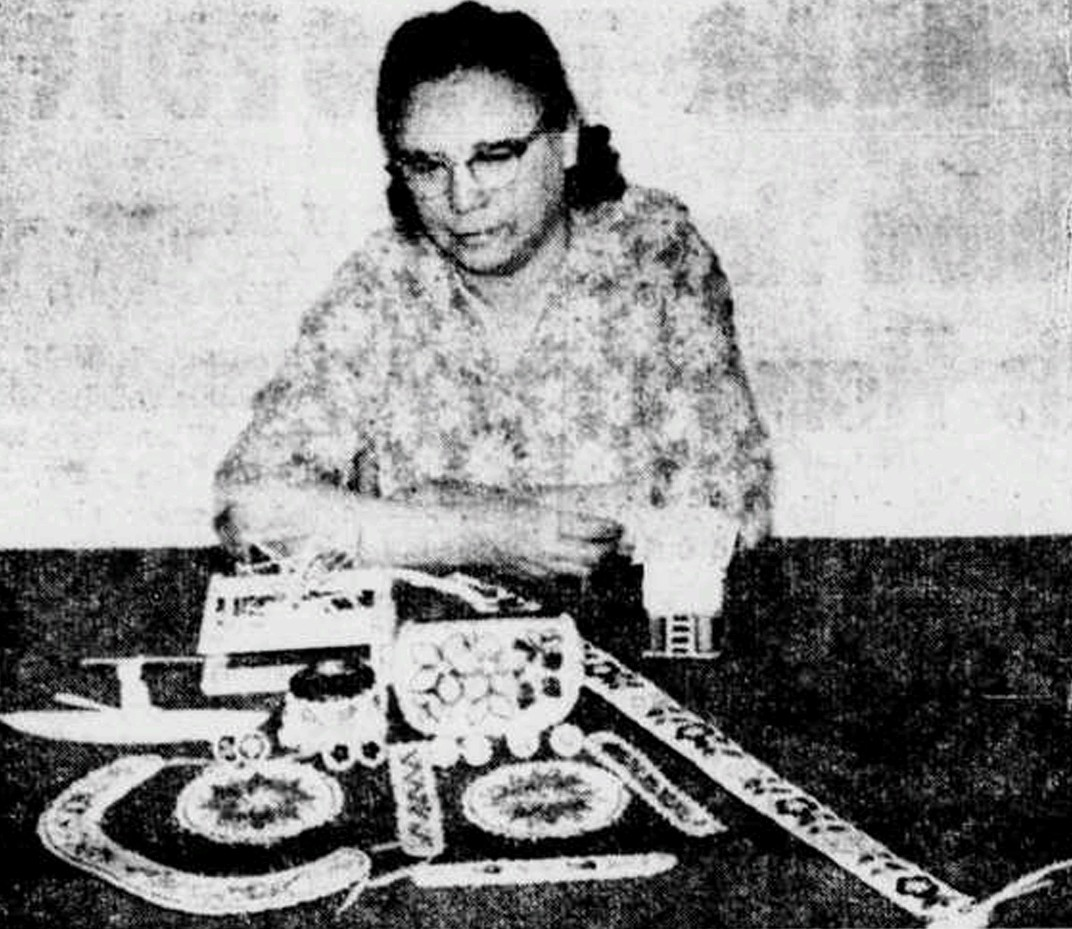
- Solomon poses with a collection of her artwork in 1963
- Born: Hannah Mardow; October 10, 1908; Fort Yukon, District of Alaska, U.S.
- Died: September 16, 2011 (aged 102); Fairbanks, Alaska, U.S.
- Occupations: Community leader, artist
- Spouse: Paul Solomon (m. 1927; died 1973)
- Children: 14, including Jonathon

Hannah Paul Solomon (née Mardow; October 10, 1908 (Note: Solomon's birth year is variously given as 1908, 1909, and 1910 in sources, and she was adopted as a baby, which complicates the dating. Her obituaries gave 1908 as the date. Her marriage license in 1927 (from Ancestry.com) was signed by her mother because she was a minor under 18 years old, which might suggest a later year.) – September 16, 2011) was an American community leader and artist. She was the first female mayor of Fort Yukon, Alaska, helped organize the Fairbanks Native Association, and was inducted into the Alaska Women's Hall of Fame in 2012. Her traditional beadwork is in the collections of several museums.

== Early life ==
She was born in Rampart, a village on the Porcupine River, near the Canadian-Alaskan border. Her first language was Gwich'in. She was adopted by older Athabascan parents, Mardow and Eliza Mardow. She attended a one-room school run by the Bureau of Indian Affairs in Fort Yukon.

== Career ==
Solomon helped to organize the Fairbanks Native Association and the Fairbanks Native Community Center, along with her longtime friend Poldine Carlo and others. She served on the board of directors of the Gwichyaa Zhee Corporation. She was active in other organizations, including Doyon Limited, Tanana Chiefs Conference and the Alaska Federation of Natives. She served in the first city council of Fort Yukon in 1960, and was the first woman to be elected mayor of the city. In 1991 she gave an oral history interview to the University of Alaska Fairbanks Rasmuson Library's Oral History Collection. She was inducted into the Alaska Women's Hall of Fame in 2012.

Solomon was known for her traditional beadwork. "When I was young we had nothing to do when we got home from school so I learned to sew," she explained in 1965. In 1967, she demonstrated beadwork as part of the "Native Village" exhibit at the Alaska 67 Centennial Exposition. Beadwork items made by Solomon are in the collections of the Rasmuson Museum in Anchorage and the Alaska Native Medical Center, among other institutions. A video about Solomon's art was shown at the Sheldon Jackson Museum in 1988 and 1990.

== Personal life and legacy ==
Mardow married Paul Solomon, a trapper and carpenter, in 1927. They had 14 children together, including activist Jonathon Solomon. She was widowed when her husband died in 1973. She died in 2011, aged 102, at her home in Fairbanks. There is a Hannah Paul Solomon "Woman of Courage" Award given annually by the Fairbanks Native Association.
