= Grayling River =

River in northern Canada

Location
- Country: Canada
- Province: British Columbia
- District: Peace River Land District

Physical characteristics
- Mouth
  - location: Liard River

The Grayling River is a river in northern British Columbia, Canada. The river flows through the Grayling River Hot Springs Ecological Reserve, and terminates the Liard River confluence.

== See also ==
- List of rivers of British Columbia
