= Yukon River Inter-Tribal Watershed Council =

Yukon River Inter-Tribal Watershed Council (YRITWC)
- Abbreviation: YRITWC
- Formation: 1997; 29 years ago
- Founder: Indigenous governments within the Yukon River Watershed
- Type: Multi-government advisory, advocacy, monitoring, and lobby group
- Legal status: Active
- Purpose: To protect the environmental integrity of the Yukon River watershed and to preserve the cultural vitality of the indigenous communities
- Locations: Alaska, Yukon Territory, British Columbia; United States, Canada
- Region served: Yukon River Watershed
- Fields: Environmental protection, Cultural preservation
- Members: 66 First Nations and tribes
- Revenue: Funding from government agencies, private initiatives and public

The Yukon River Inter-Tribal Watershed Council (YRITWC) is a multi-government advisory, advocacy, monitoring, and lobby group for protecting and cleaning up the Yukon River. It consists of 66 First Nations and tribes in Alaska, Yukon, and British Columbia, living along the Yukon River.

Its vision is to "be able to drink water directly from the Yukon River." YRITWC receives its funding from both government agencies and private initiatives; it also accepts donations from members of the public.

== History ==
The YRITWC was founded in 1997, Indigenous governments living within the watershed come together and pledged to collaborate to give to profer solutions to various environmental governing authority issues impacting the environmental quality of the River and its watershed. These groups from the Canadian Yukon Territory and British Columbia and the American state of Alaska signed a treaty called the Yukon River Watershed Inter-Tribal Accord which defined the purpose of the YRITWC and established a council. YRITWC is a multi-government advisory, advocacy, and monitoring group with a two-fold mission "to protect the environmental integrity of the River's watershed and to preserve the cultural vitality of the indigenous communities that are dependent upon and part of the watershed".

== Programs ==
The Yukon River Inter-tribal council are focused on 5 main areas- mining, water quality, brownfields, solid waste and science. YRITWC promotes the use of indigenous traditional knowledge in explaining the science and in developing programs to combat the twin threats of climate change and environmental degradation in the Yukon River Basin.

A new study has shown melting permafrost is changing the chemistry of the Yukon River, just one of many climate-related changes affecting the Yukon and beyond. This research led by scientists from the USGS. tested water samples collected from the Yukon and Tanana rivers over a period of thirty years. Results showed that melting and refreezing of upper layers of the permafrost cause ground water to percolate deeper into the soil and carry more materials into rivers. Tests show elevated level of minerals like calcium, magnesium and sulphates, though not necessarily harmful to humans but could possibly become a health hazard with time. Mercury, a powerful neurotoxin, is another substance that is being monitored because of its health effects.
