= Lewis Parker (artist) =

Canadian Illustrator and Historical Artist (1926 - 2011)

- Born: Lewis Edgar Hyde Parker; January 16, 1926; Toronto, Ontario, Canada
- Died: March 27, 2011 (aged 85); Toronto, Ontario, Canada
- Known for: Painter, muralist, illustrator
- Spouse: Eleanor Louise Parker

Lewis Parker (January 16, 1926 – March 27, 2011) was a Canadian illustrator, painter and muralist. An important and distinguished historical painter, Parker specialized in historical scenes and North American native cultures. He was also a children's book illustrator, and his work is featured in educational texts used across Canada. He made major contributions toward interpreting and promoting the understanding of the history of Canada. He was born in Toronto, Ontario.

== Early life and training ==
Born in Toronto in 1926, Lewis Parker was the eldest of four born to Gilbert and Dorothy Parker. From an early age, Parker showed passion, determination and discipline in teaching himself to draw. So focused on drawing was Lewis that his mother, concerned for his social life, would invite his schoolmates over after school, hoping this would encourage Lewis to play. Lewis responded by sketching favourite cartoon characters for his delighted peers. By the age of 12, Lewis had amassed dozens of sketchbooks filled with people and storybook characters.

In 1939, Parker attended Central Technical School in Toronto. Ever self-motivated, he applied his disciplined approach to all studies. Seldom openly defiant, Parker submitted his own versions of assignments, always far more detailed than required.

From 1941 to 1944, Parker apprenticed at Rabjohn Illustrators, where he met a significant mentor, Bert Grassick. His formative experience at Rabjohn influenced the connections he later made with artists in Toronto's art scene. Enlisting in the Canadian Army in World War II between 1944 and 1946, Parker gained valuable experience as a cartoonist and illustrator for the Maple Leaf, Canada's overseas newspaper.

== Artistic career ==
After World War II, Parker became a political cartoonist for the 'yellow pages' that bookended Maclean's magazine in the 1950s. Between 1947 and 1956, he formed a commercial art firm with Bill Sherman and Gordon and Norman Laws called Sherman, Laws and Parker, a business focusing on visual arts in advertising. During this time, Parker recognized a need to design his own direction in the artistic milieu.

Between 1966 and 1968, Parker received two Canada Council Grants. The first was to study the Aztec and Mayan cultures in Mexico, where he relocated for a year with his family in 1966, completing several historical works. The second, awarded in 1968, enabled him to travel with wildlife photographer Eugene Aliman to western Canada to study the Plains Indians.

Parker was then commissioned by the Huronia Council of Ontario to create historical paintings for Sainte-Marie-Among-the-Hurons. This series included on-site presentations of pre-European Native life on location at the site in Midland, Ontario.

Between 1968 and 1974, Parker worked in collaboration with acclaimed painter Gerald Lazare on several extended projects. One of these, entitled the "Huron Collection", was a series of 36 paintings depicting the life and culture of Canada's Huron Natives.

Between 1970 and 1974, Parker, again in collaboration with Gerald Lazare, created the 'Indians of Canada' series for the Wildlife Federation. The National Film Board of Canada then commissioned Lazare and Parker to create an illustrative series for film work on the Beluga Whale and the Plains Indians.

Between 1972 and 1974, the partnership was commissioned to visually depict the history of mankind from Australopithecus to current times in the Museum of Man in Ottawa. The tableaux showing this evolution was painted inside three domes of the museum building, each which had a double curve and measured 16 feet by 75 feet. Parker and Lazare worked in preparation for a full year with research specialists of the museum. The final massive painting took eight months to complete, with Parker and Lazare doing one each and joining forces to complete the third.

Between 1974 and 1976, Parker rendered a series of historical artworks to be used as stills for both the National Film Board of Canada and the Ontario Institute for Studies in Education.

Between 1980 and 1982, Lewis began his journey into in-depth historical paintings with Parks Canada, depicting key scenes in Maritime history. The first, set in 1758, was entitled "The Expulsion of the Acadians from Prince Edward Island". This painting, commissioned specifically to be used in a film presentation, has been requested for reproduction in part or in full on numerous occasions . The second was called, "The Building of the Dikes at Grand Pre".

Parker then completed seven paintings for Fort Beausejour, portraying the fortification at different periods in history, with reproduction of the finished artwork located in displays around the fort.

Parker was then recruited to create the Louisbourg murals, where he translated on site a wealth of information from historians and archeologists into two huge canvases focusing on maritime life in the 18th century town. An outstanding artistic success, these montage murals are viewed by thousands of visitors yearly, with the Fortress of Louisbourg receiving numerous requests to reproduce details from these paintings for books, DVD's and films.

== Awards ==
In 1986, Parker won both domestic and international awards for a book co-created with author Debra McNabb called, "Old Sydney Town: Historic Buildings of the North End".

In 1993, Parker received a Lifetime Achievement Award from the Canadian Association of Professional Image Makers CAPIC

== Recognition ==
Canada Post: On 4 April 1975 Canada Post issued 'Ceremonial Dress' designed by Georges Beaupré, based on a painting by Lewis Parker (artist) of a ceremonial costume of the Kutchin tribe /Gwich'in people. The 8¢ stamps are perforated 12.5 mm and were printed by Ashton-Potter Limited.

Royal Canadian Mint: Lewis Parker's artwork, "The Founding of Louisbourg", was featured on the 1995 Royal Canadian Mint| Royal Canadian Mint numismatic coins (20th century) $100 coin. 16,916 coins with Parker's artwork were issued.
