= Alexander Hunter Murray =

Alexander Hunter Murray (1818 or 1819 – 20 April 1874) was a Hudson's Bay Company fur trader and artist.

== Life ==
According to the Parish Registers at the General Register Office in Edinburgh four brothers were registered at Crawfordjohn, Lanarkshire:

- Thomas Hunter Murray on October 25, 1813
- Alexander William Hunter Murray on October 22, 1815
- William Murray on April 13, 1817
- Ebenezer Murray on May 21, 1819,

Alexander, William and Ebenezer were all in Canada by 1841, but found steady work very difficult to find. Alex joined the American Fur Company in 1842 and Hudson's Bay Company in 1846.

Alexander Hunter Murray was married to Anne Campbell, and they had eight children together, the eldest, Helen, being born at Fort Yukon.

== Work ==
According to the Government of Manitoba, via the Hudson’s Bay Company Archives of Winnipeg, Alexander Hunter Murray was in the employ of the American Fur Company prior to 1845, when he was hired by the Hudson’s Bay Company. The last of his employment information on the document states “1864-1865 allowed furlough.” This document also lays out his myriad of jobs under the Hudson’s Bay Company.

In 1847, he established the trading post at Fort Yukon at the juncture of the Yukon and Porcupine rivers in the land of the Gwichʼin people. Originally part of Russian Alaska, the Hudson's Bay Company continued to trade there until expelled by the US government in 1869 following the Alaska Purchase.

He drew numerous sketches of fur trade posts and of people and wrote Journal of the Yukon, 1847–48, which give valuable insight into the culture of local First Nation people at the time.

On 4 April 1975 Canada Post issued 'Dance of the Kutcha-Kutchin' in the Indians of Canada, Indians of the Subarctic series. The stamp was designed by Georges Beaupré based on a drawing by Alexander Hunter Murray (1851) in Library and Archives Canada, Ottawa, Ontario. The 8¢ stamps are perforated 13.5 and were printed by Canadian Bank Note Company, Limited.
