= Gwichʼin =

Ethnic group indigenous to North America

Gwichʼin Dinjii Zhuu
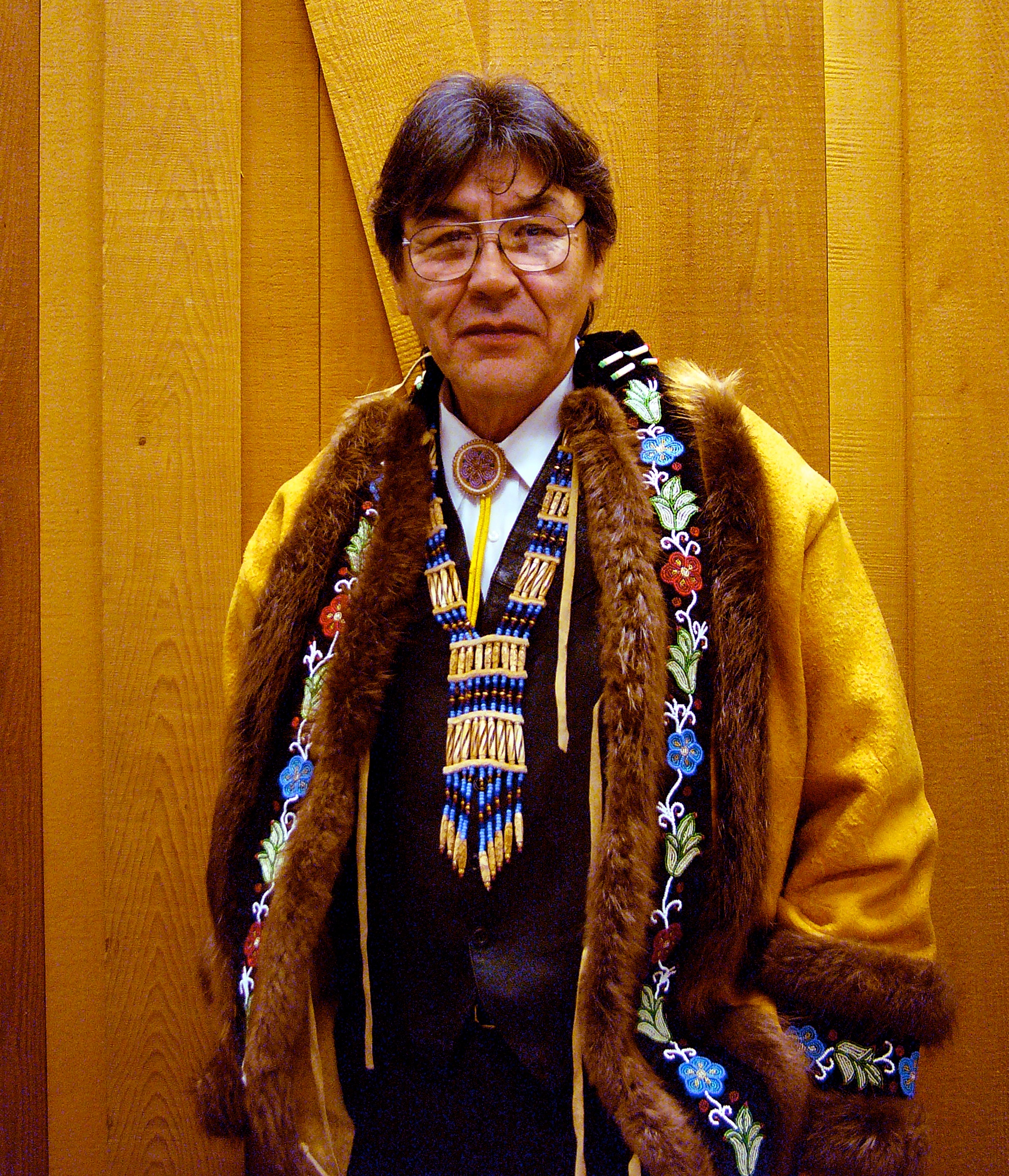
- Former Grand Chief Clarence Alexander, Ecotrust Indigenous Leadership Award ceremony, Portland, Oregon, 2004

Regions with significant populations
- Canada (Northwest Territories, Yukon): 3,275
- United States (Alaska): 1,100

Languages
- Gwichʼin, English

Religion
- Christianity, Animism

Related ethnic groups
- Alaskan Athabaskans; Especially Hän

- People: Dinjii Zhuu Gwichʼin
- Language: Dinju Zhuh Kʼyuu
- Country: Gwichʼin Nành, Denendeh ᑌᓀᐣᑌᐧ

The Gwichʼin (or Kutchin or Loucheux) are an Athabaskan-speaking First Nations people of Canada and an Alaska Native people. They live in the northwestern part of North America, mostly north of the Arctic Circle.

Gwichʼin are well-known for their crafting of snowshoes, birchbark canoes, and the two-way sled. They are renowned for their intricate and ornate beadwork. They also continue to make traditional caribou-skin clothing and porcupine quillwork embroidery, both of which are highly regarded among Gwichʼin. Today, the Gwich’in economy consists mostly of hunting, fishing, and seasonal wage-paying employment.

== Name ==
Their name is sometimes spelled Kutchin or Gwitchin and translates as "one who dwells" or "resident of [a region]." Historically, the French called the Gwichʼin Loucheux ("squinters"), as well as Tukudh or Takudh, a term also used by Anglican missionaries. Sometimes, these terms may refer (explicitly or implicitly) to particular dialects of the Gwichʼin language (or to the communities that speak them).

Gwichʼin often refer to themselves by the term Dinjii Zhuu instead of Gwichʼin. Dinjii Zhuu literally translates as "Small People," but figuratively it refers to all First Nations, not just Gwichʼin.

== Gwichʼin language ==
A Gwich’in speaker, recorded in Alaska.

The Gwichʼin language, part of the Athabaskan language family, has two main dialects, eastern and western, which are delineated roughly at the United States-Canada border. Each village has unique dialect differences, idioms, and expressions. The Old Crow people in the northern Yukon have approximately the same dialect as those bands living in Venetie and Arctic Village, Alaska.

Approximately 300 Alaskan Gwichʼin speak their language, according to the Alaska Native Language Center. However, according to the UNESCO Interactive Atlas of the World's Languages in Danger, Gwichʼin is now a "severely endangered" language, with fewer than 150 fluent speakers in Alaska and another 250 in northwest Canada.

Innovative language revitalization projects are underway to document the language and to enhance the writing and translation skills of younger Gwichʼin speakers. In one project lead research associate and fluent speaker Gwichʼin elder, Kenneth Frank, works with linguists which include young Gwichʼin speakers affiliated with the Alaska Native Language Center at the University of Alaska, Fairbanks, to document traditional knowledge of caribou anatomy.

Analysis of the traditional place names indicate that the Gwich’in have an ancient history in this region, likely since the early Holocene (~8,000 years).

== Gwichʼin tribes and clans ==
The many different bands or tribes of Gwichʼin include but are not limited to: Deenduu, Draanjik, Di’haii, Gwichyaa, Kʼiitlʼit, Neetsaii or Neetsʼit, Ehdiitat, Danzhit Hanlaii, Teetlʼit, and Vuntut or Vantee.

Three major clans survive from antiquity across Gwichʼin lands. People are expected to marry outside their clans. Two are primary clans and the third has a lower/secondary status. The first clan are the Nantsaii, which literally translates as "First on the land"; the second clan are the Chitsʼyaa which translates as "The helpers" (second on the land).

The last clan is called the Tenjeraatsaii, which translates as "In the middle" or "independents". This last clan is reserved for people who marry within their own clan, which is considered incestuous. To a lesser degree, it is for children of people who are outside of the clan system.

== Location and population ==
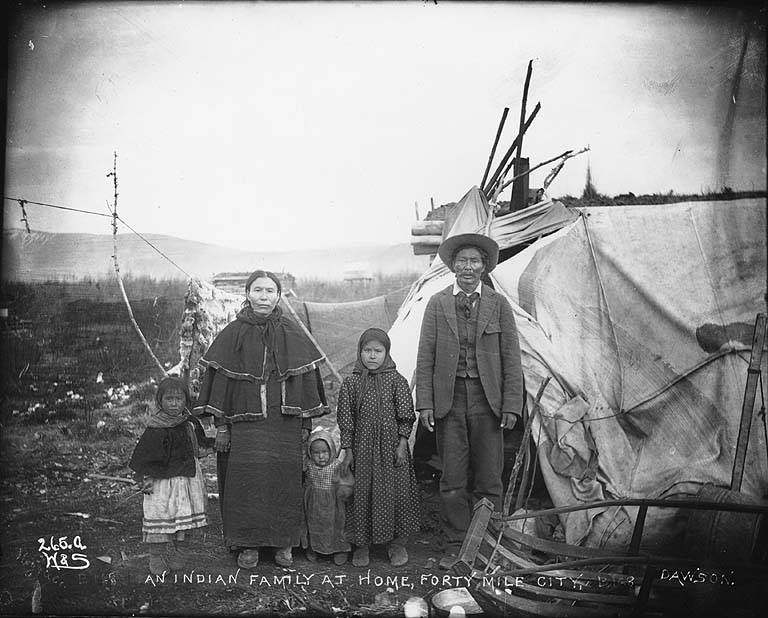
Gwichʼin family outside their home, c. 1899

Over 6,000 Gwichʼin live in 15 small communities in northern parts of the Northwest Territories and the Yukon Territory of Canada, and in northern Alaska. The Gwichʼin communities are:

- Alaska
  - Arctic Village (Dihai-kutchin and Neetsaii Gwichʼin)
  - Beaver (Gwichyaa Gwichʼin)
  - Birch Creek (Deenduu Gwichʼin)
  - Chalkyitsik (Draanjik Gwichʼin)
  - Circle (Danzhit Hanlaii Gwichʼin)
  - Fort Yukon (Gwichyaa Gwichʼin)
  - Venetie (Dihai-kutchin and Neetsaii Gwichʼin)
  - Stevens Village
  - Canyon Village
  - Christian
- Northwest Territories
  - Aklavik (Ehdiitat Gwichʼin)
  - Fort McPherson (traditional name, Tetlit Zheh, Tetlit Gwichʼin)
  - Inuvik (largest of the four Gwichʼin communities in the Gwichʼin Settlement Area (GSA), English is the main language spoken, though schools teach and a handful of local people still speak Gwichʼin.)
  - Tsiigehtchic (formerly Arctic Red River) (Gwichyaa Gwichʼin)
- Yukon
  - Old Crow (Vuntut Gwitchin First Nation)

== Oral history ==
The Gwichʼin have a strong oral tradition of storytelling that has only recently begun to be written in the modern orthography. Gwichʼin folk stories include the "Vazaagiitsak cycle" (literally, "His Younger Brother Became Snagged"), which focuses on the comical adventures of a Gwichʼin misfit who, among other things, battles lice on a giant's head, plays the fool to the cunning fox, and eats the scab from his own anus unknowingly. Gwichʼin comedies often contain bawdy humor. Other major characters from the Gwichʼin oral tradition include: Googhwaii, Ool Ti’, Tł’oo Thal, K’aiheenjik, K’iizhazhal, and Shaanyaati’.

Numerous folk tales about prehistoric times all begin with the phrase Deenaadai’, which translates roughly as "In the ancient days". This is usually followed with the admission that this was "when all of the people could talk to the animals, and all of the animals could speak with the people". These stories are often parables, which suggest a proper protocol, or code of behavior for Gwichʼin. Equality, generosity, hard work, kindness, mercy, cooperation for mutual success, and just revenge are often the themes of stories such as: "Tsyaa Too Oozhrii Gwizhit" (The Boy In The Moon), "Zhoh Ts’à Nahtryaa" (The Wolf and the Wolverine), "Vadzaih Luk Hàa" (The Caribou and the Fish).

== Traditional beliefs ==
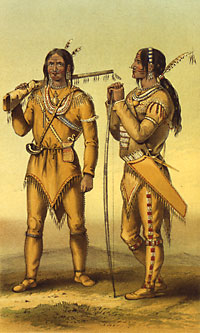
Gwichʼin hunters at Fort Yukon, 1847

In recent times, important figures in who have represented traditional belief structures are: Johnny and Sarah Frank, Sahneuti, and Ch’eegwalti’.

Caribou are an integral part of First Nations and Inuit oral histories and legends, and are integral to their survival. The Gwichʼin creation story tells that the Gwichʼin people and the caribou separated from a single entity. There is a stable population of woodland caribou throughout a large portion of the Gwichʼin Settlement Area, and such woodland caribou are an important food source for Gwichʼin. They harvest other caribou at a higher rate.

Gwichʼin living in Inuvik, Aklavik, Fort McPherson, and Tsiigehtchic harvest woodland caribou but not as much as other caribou. The Gwichʼin prefer to hunt Porcupine caribou or the barren-ground Blue Nose herd, which travel in large herds, when they are available. Many hunters claimed that woodland caribou, which form very small groups, are wilder, both hard to see and hard to hunt. They are very smart, cunning, and elusive.

== Caribou as cultural symbol ==
The caribou vadzaih is the cultural symbol and a keystone subsistence species of the Gwichʼin, just as the buffalo is to the Plains Indians. In Rick Bass's book entitled Caribou Rising: Defending the Porcupine Herd, Gwich-'in Culture, and the Arctic National Wildlife Refuge, he quotes Sarah James as saying, "We are the caribou people. Caribou are not just what we eat; they are who we are. They are in our stories and songs and the whole way we see the world. Caribou are our life. Without caribou we wouldn't exist." Traditionally, their tents and most of their clothing were made out of caribou skin, and they lived "mostly on caribou and all other wild meats." Caribou fur skins were placed on top of spruce branches as bedding and flooring. Soap was made from boiled poplar tree ashes mixed with caribou fat. Drums were made of caribou hide. Overalls were made from "really good white tanned caribou skin".

Elders have identified at least 150 descriptive Gwichʼin names for all of the bones, organs, and tissues. "Associated with the caribou's anatomy are not just descriptive Gwichʼin names for all of the body parts including bones, organs, and tissues as well as "an encyclopedia of stories, songs, games, toys, ceremonies, traditional tools, skin clothing, personal names and surnames, and a highly developed ethnic cuisine."

== Tattooing ==
Yidįįłtoo are the traditional face tattoos of the Hän Gwich’in.

== Ethnobotany ==
In 2002, Gwichʼin Social and Cultural Institute, the Aurora Research Institute, and Parks Canada co-published a book entitled Gwichʼin Ethnobotany: Plants Used by the Gwichʼin for Food, Medicine, Shelter and Tools in collaboration with elders, in which they described dozens of trees, shrubs, woody plants, berry plants, vascular plants, mosses and lichens, and fungi that the Gwichʼin used. Examples included black spruce Picea mariana and white spruce Picea glauca, Ts’iivii which was used as "food, medicine, shelter, fuel and tools." Boiled cones and branches were used to prevent and to treat colds.

== Christianity ==
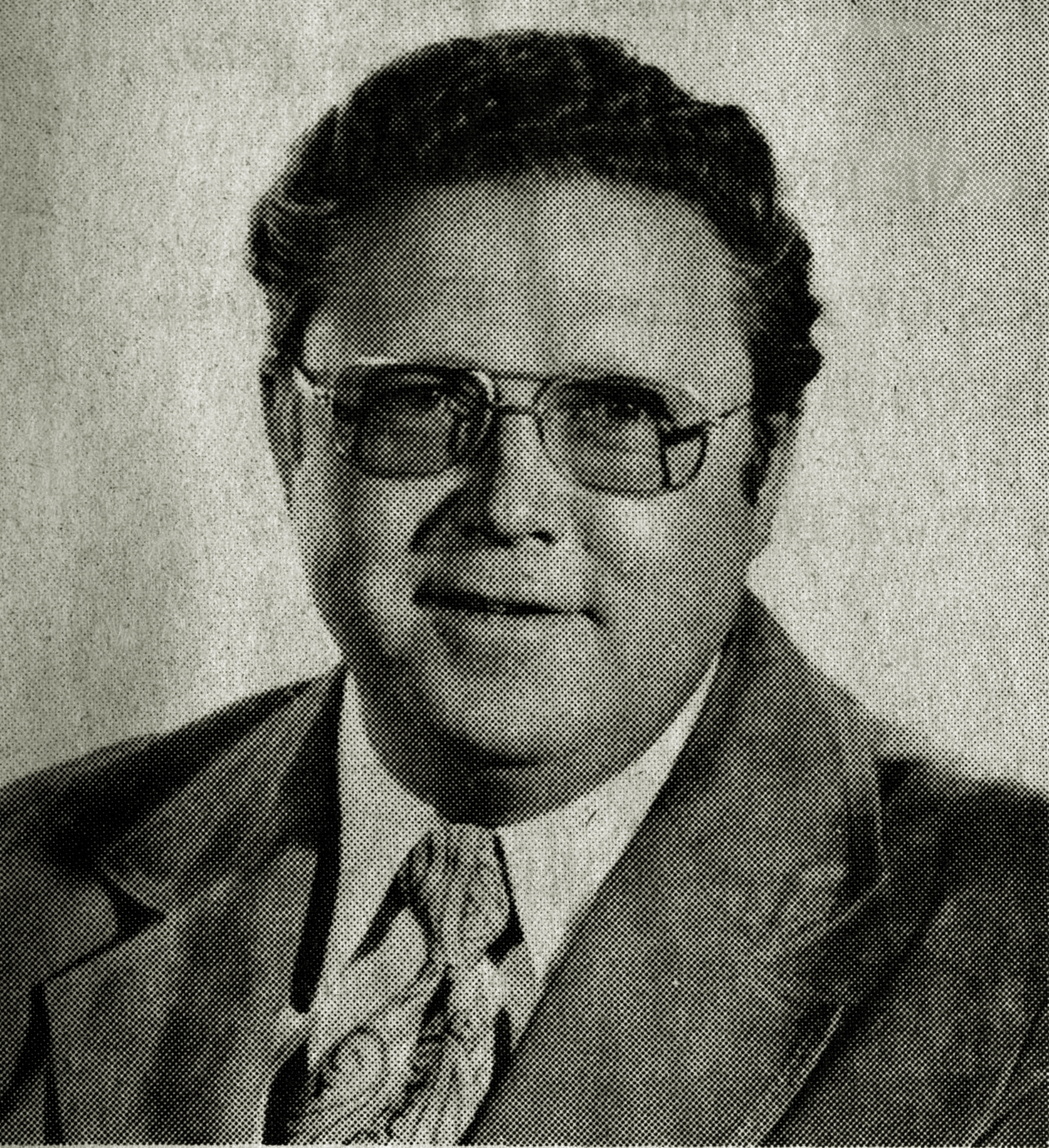
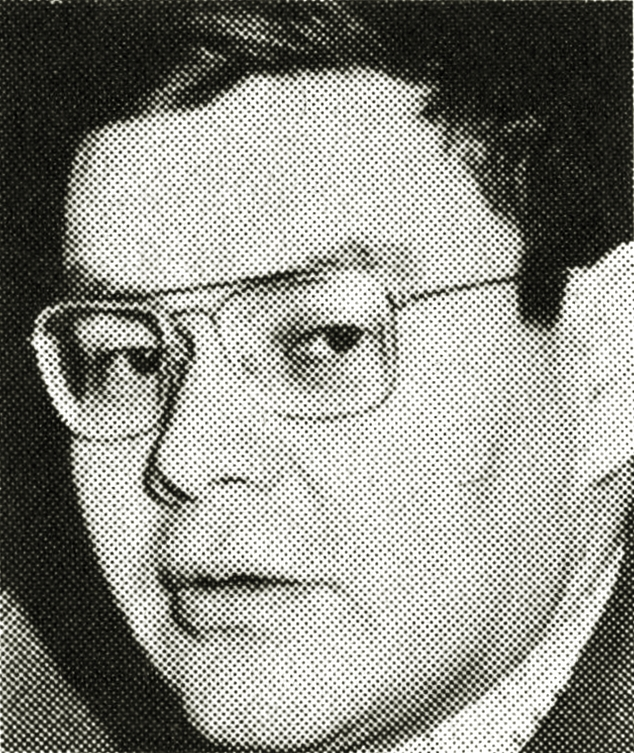
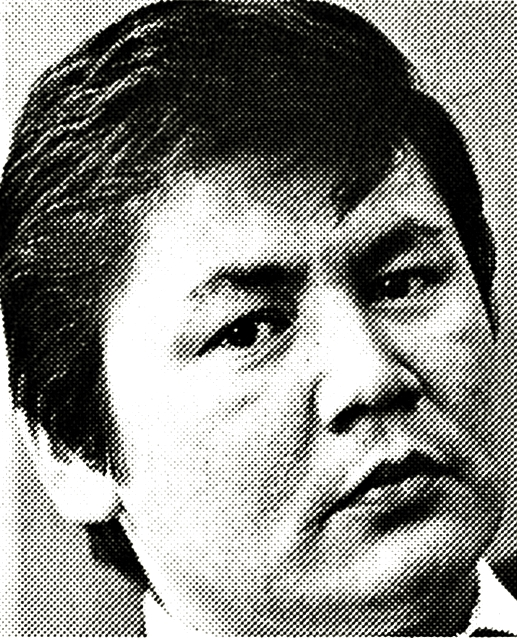
Only five Gwichʼin have served in the Alaska Legislature, all in the House of Representatives and all from Fairbanks or the Yukon Flats region. They are, in chronological order of service with the first three pictured: Jules Wright (the only Republican of the group, the others are Democrats), Larry Peterson, Tim Wallis, Kay Wallis and Woodie Salmon.

The introduction of Christianity in the 1840s throughout Gwichʼin territory produced spiritual changes that are still widely in effect today. Widespread conversion to Christianity, as influenced by Anglican and Catholic missionaries, led to these as the two dominant Christian sects among the Gwichʼin. Notable figures in the missionary movement among the Gwichʼin are Archdeacon Hudson Stuck, William West Kirkby, Robert McDonald, Deacon William Loola, and Deacon Albert Tritt. The Traditional Chief, an honorary and lifetime title, of one Gwichʼin village is also an Episcopal priest: the Rev. Traditional Chief Trimble Gilbert of Arctic Village. Chief Gilbert is recognized as the Second Traditional Chief of all of the Athabascan tribes in Interior Alaska through the non-profit Tanana Chiefs Conference.

The Takudh Bible is a translation of the entire King James Bible into Gwichʼin. The Takudh Bible is in a century-old orthography that is not very accurate, and thus hard to read. In the 1960s Richard Mueller designed a new orthography for Gwichʼin, which has now become standard.

== Recognition ==
On 4 April 1975, Canada Post issued two stamps in the Indians of Canada, Indians of the Subarctic series both designed by Georges Beaupré. One was Ceremonial Dress based on a painting by Lewis Parker of "a ceremonial costume of the Kutchin tribe" (Gwichʼin people). The other, Dance of the Kutcha-Kutchin was based on a painting by Alexander Hunter Murray The 8¢ stamps are perforated 12.5 and 13.5 and were printed by Ashton-Potter Limited and the Canadian Bank Note Company.

== Current politics ==
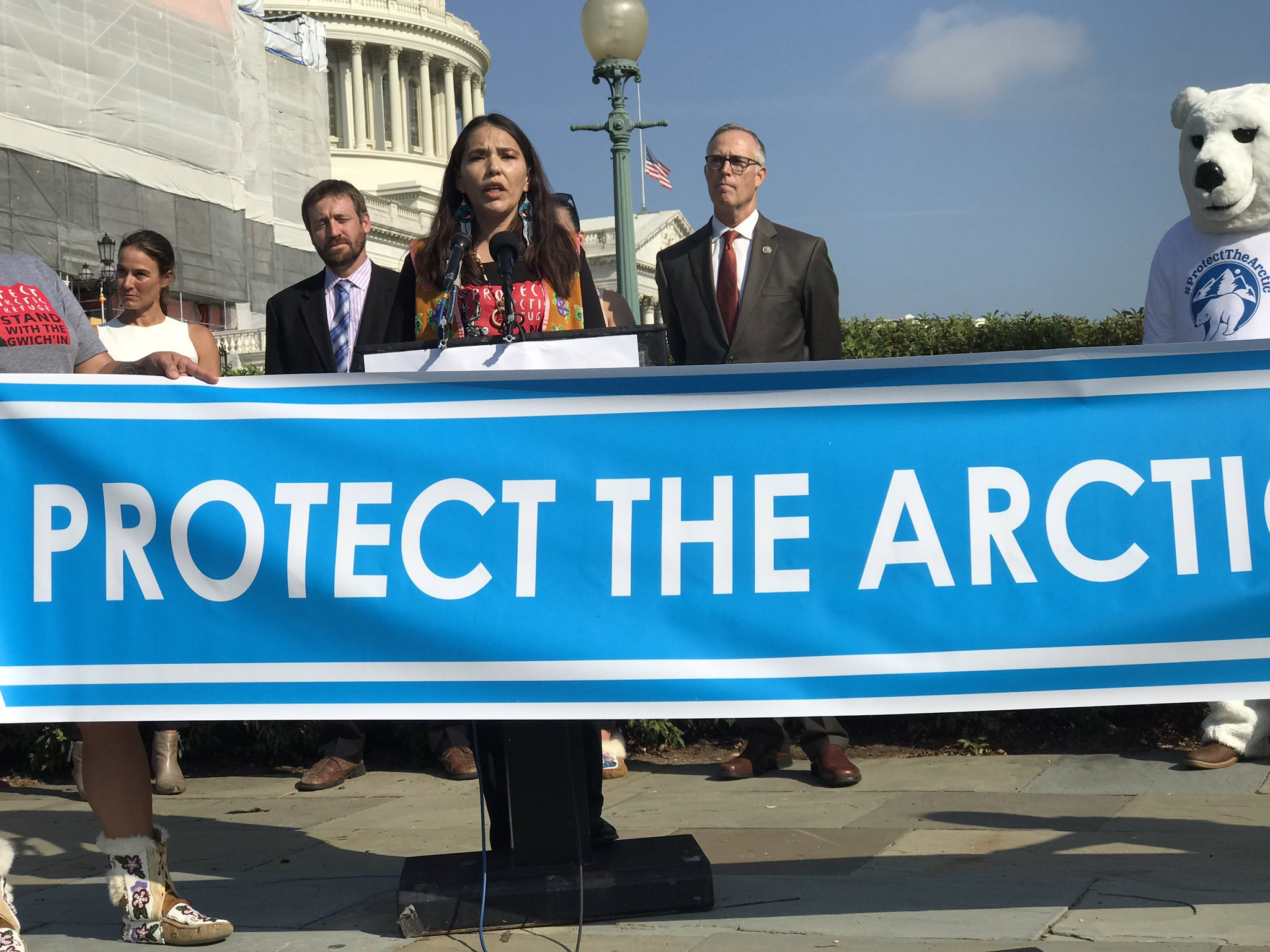
Bernadette Demientieff, member of the Gwich’in Steering Committee, speaking in support congressional efforts to protect the Arctic in 2019.

Caribou is traditionally a major component of their diet. Many Gwichʼin people are dependent on the Porcupine caribou which herd calves on the coastal plain in the Arctic National Wildlife Refuge (ANWR). Gwichʼin people have been very active in protesting and lobbying against the possibility of oil drilling in ANWR, due to fears that oil drilling will deplete the population of the Porcupine Caribou herd.

Bobbi Jo Greenland Morgan, who is head of the Gwichʼin Tribal Council, along with the Canadian government, the Yukon and Northwest territories and other First Nations, expressed concerns to the United States about the proposed lease sale in the calving grounds of a large cross-border Porcupine caribou herd to energy drilling, despite international agreements to protect it." In December, the United States "released a draft environmental impact study proposal for the lease sale with a public comment period until February 11, 2019. Environment Canada wrote in a letter to the U.S. Bureau of Land Management (BLM) Alaska office, (Note: According to the January 13, 2019 The Globe and Mail article, concerns were raised as there has been a change of structure in the US administration of the ANWR. For decades, the U.S. representative used to come from the United States Fish and Wildlife Service. The current member is from the United States Department of the Interior (DOI) and operates under a different mandate as the United States Fish and Wildlife Service representatives who worked with Canada on this matter for decades. is an agency operating through the Assistant Secretary for Land and Minerals Management which are both under the United States Department of the Interior (DOI). According to Bob Weber, Global Affairs Canada said that the "U.S. is living up to the agreement on the Porcupine herd". The Bureau of Land Management (BLM) is an agency operating through the Assistant Secretary for Land and Minerals Management which are both under the United States Department of the Interior (DOI).) that "Canada is concerned about the potential transboundary impacts of oil and gas exploration and development planned for the Arctic National Wildlife Refuge Coastal Plain."

For similar reasons, Gwichʼin also actively protested the development of oil in the Yukon Flats National Wildlife Refuge, and a proposed land trade from the United States National Wildlife Refuge System and Doyon, Limited.

== See also ==
- Arctic Son
- Oil on Ice
- Being Caribou
