= Fort Yukon, Alaska =

Town in Alaska

Fort Yukon, Alaska Gwichyaa Zheh (Gwichʼin)
- City
- City of Fort Yukon
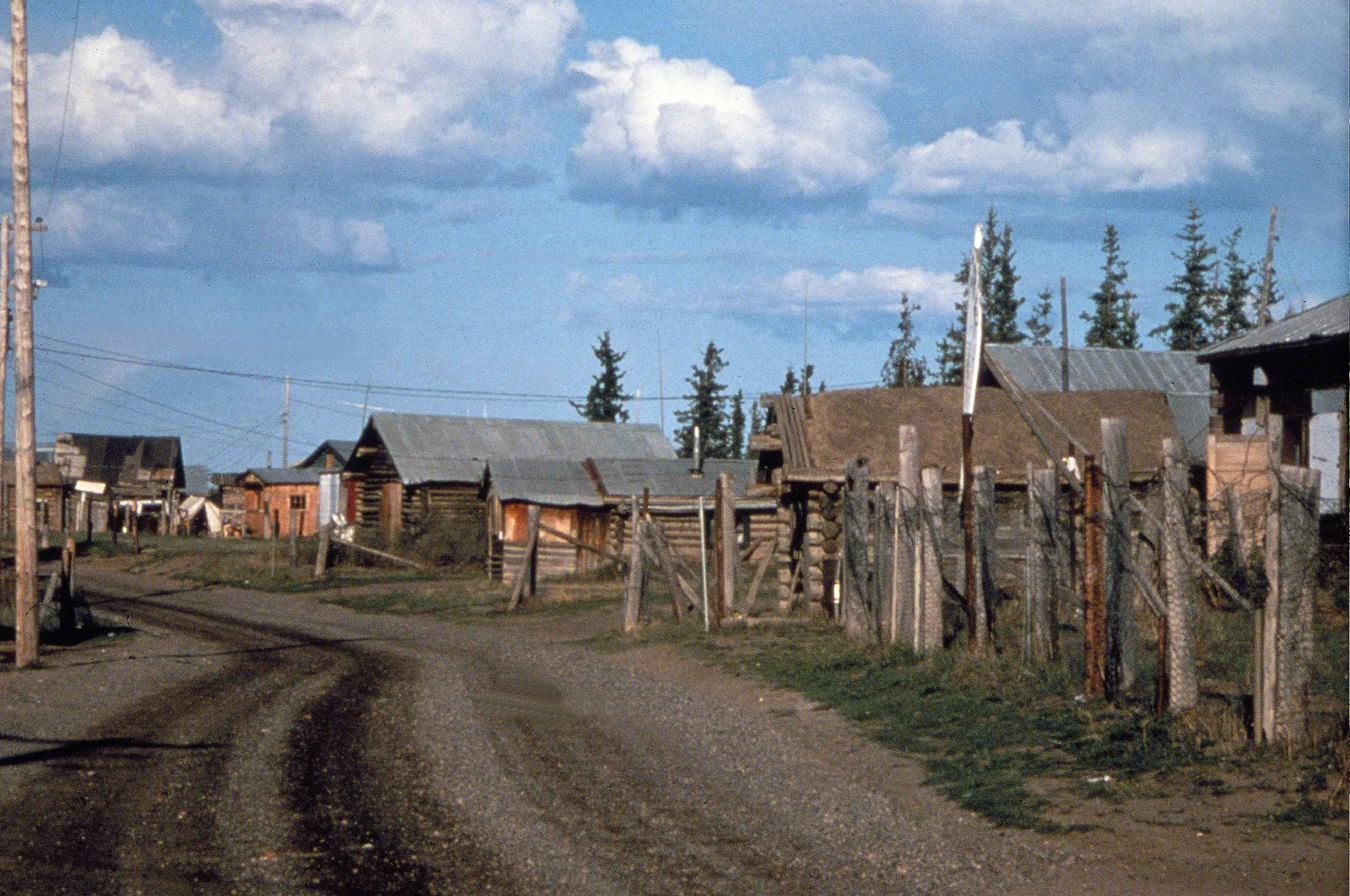
- Yukon flats in Fort Yukon

- Location in Alaska Fort Yukon (North America)
- Coordinates: 66°34′3″N 145°15′23″W
- Country: United States
- State: Alaska
- Census Area: Yukon-Koyukuk
- Incorporated: February 17, 1959

Government
  - Mayor: Richard Carroll, Jr.
  - State senator: Mike Cronk (R)
  - State rep.: Rebecca Schwanke (R)

Area
  - Total: 6.94 sq mi (17.97 km^{2})
  - Land: 6.75 sq mi (17.47 km^{2})
  - Water: 0.20 sq mi (0.51 km^{2})
- Elevation: 430 ft (130 m)

Population (2020)
  - Total: 428
  - Density: 63/sq mi (24.5/km^{2})
- Time zone: UTC-9 (Alaska (AKST))
  - Summer (DST): UTC-8 (AKDT)
- ZIP code: 99740
- Area code: 907
- FIPS code: 02-26760
- GNIS feature ID: 1402276

Fort Yukon (Gwichʼin: Gwichyaa Zheh) is a village in the Yukon-Koyukuk Census Area in the U.S. state of Alaska, straddling the Arctic Circle. The population, predominantly Gwichʼin Alaska Natives, was 428 at the 2020 census, down from 595 in 2000.

Fort Yukon was the hometown of the late Alaska Congressman Don Young. Served by Fort Yukon Airport, it is also known for having the record highest temperature in Alaska.

== History ==
This area north of the Arctic Circle was occupied for thousands of years by cultures of indigenous people and in historic times by the Gwich’in people. Gwichʼyaa Zhee means "House on the Flats" in Gwichʼin.

What became the village of Fort Yukon developed from a trading post, Fort Yukon, established by Alexander Hunter Murray of the Hudson's Bay Company, on June 25, 1847. Murray drew numerous sketches of fur trade posts and of people and wrote the Journal of the Yukon, 1847–48, which gave valuable insight into the culture of the Gwich’in at the time. While the post was in Russian America, the Hudson's Bay Company continued to trade there until the American traders expelled it in 1869, following the Alaska Purchase when the Alaska Commercial Company took over the post.

During the Klondike Gold Rush, in the winter of 1897–1898, Fort Yukon received two hundred prospectors from Dawson City, which was short of supply. A post office was established on July 12, 1898, with John Hawksly as its first postmaster. The settlement suffered over the following decades as a result of several infectious disease epidemics and a 1949 flood.

During the 1950s, the United States Air Force established a base and radar station at Fort Yukon; the town was officially incorporated in 1959. Since the late 20th century, due in part to its extreme northerly location and its proximity to Fairbanks, it has become a minor tourist destination.

On February 7, 1984, a Terrier Malemute-type sounding rocket, with a maximum altitude of 310 miles (500 km), was launched from Fort Yukon.

== Geography ==
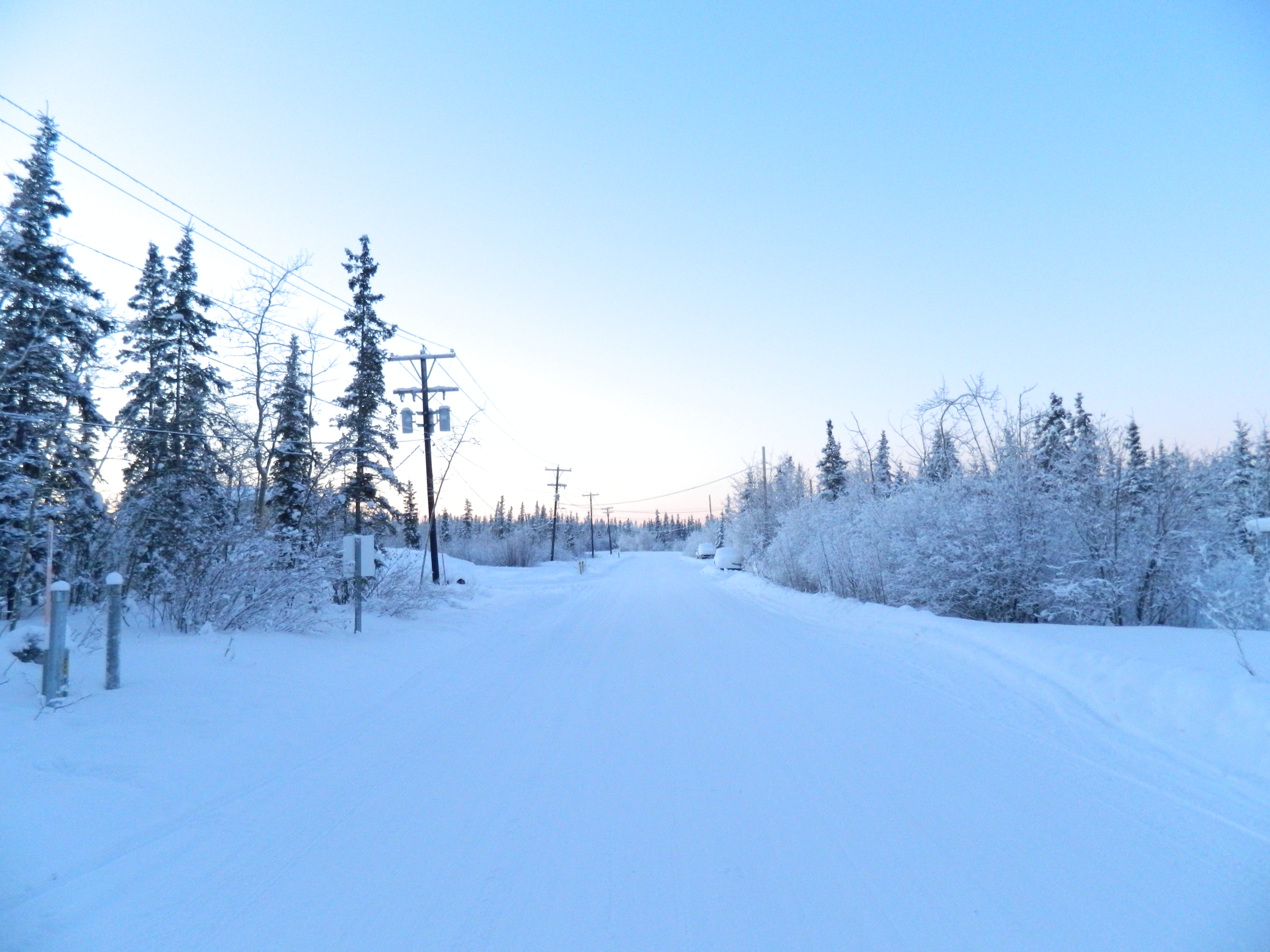
Fort Yukon village street on the Winter Solstice, before sunrise at 11:30 am.

Fort Yukon is located on the north bank of the Yukon River at its confluence with the Porcupine River, about 145 miles (233 km) northeast of Fairbanks.

As of 2014, the Arctic Circle passes through the southern portion of the city at 66°33′48.1″N 145°15′23″W. Due to long-term oscillations in the Earth's axis, the Arctic Circle currently shifts northward by about 14.5 metres (48 ft) per year, though varying substantially from year to year due to the complexity of the movement.

According to the United States Census Bureau, Yukon City has a total area of 7.4 square miles (19 km^{2}), of which 7.0 square miles (18 km^{2}) of it is land and 0.4 square miles (1.0 km^{2}) of it (5.65%) is water.

=== Climate ===
Fort Yukon has a strongly continental subarctic climate (Köppen climate classification: Dsc). In the summer Fort Yukon has midnight sun and in December the sun appears for only a few hours each day.

Summer temperatures are exceptionally high for such a northerly area, being far warmer than the tree line threshold. The highest temperature ever recorded in Alaska occurred in Fort Yukon on June 27, 1915, when it reached 100 °F (37.8 °C). This was also the highest temperature recorded north of the Arctic Circle until June 20, 2020, when it was tied by a 38 °C (100.4 °F) reading at Verkhoyansk, a location similarly known for its extremely continental climate. Many sources claim Verkhoyansk had the warmer temperature, but due to the two different temperature scales used and the fact that neither town recorded the temperature to the tenth of a degree, it's impossible to know if Verkhoyansk truly broke Fort Yukon's record.

Fort Yukon is also subject to severe winters, being less influenced by chinook winds than areas to the west—the winter season absolute maximum being 13 °F (7.2 °C) colder than in Fairbanks. Until 1971, Fort Yukon held the all-time lowest temperature record for Alaska and the United States at −78 °F (−61.1 °C) on January 14, 1934, and it still holds the record for the lowest mean monthly temperature when the notoriously cold month of December 1917 had an average daily temperature of −48.3 °F (−44.6 °C) and the minimum averaged −58 °F (−50.0 °C).

Climate data for Fort Yukon, Alaska (2006–2020 normals, extremes 2002–present)
Month	Jan	Feb	Mar	Apr	May	Jun	Jul	Aug	Sep	Oct	Nov	Dec	Year
Record high °F (°C)	44 (7)	35 (2)	51 (11)	69 (21)	83 (28)	90 (32)	90 (32)	89 (32)	71 (22)	75 (24)	35 (2)	40 (4)	90 (32)
Mean maximum °F (°C)	21.5 (−5.8)	27.5 (−2.5)	37.7 (3.2)	55.6 (13.1)	75.7 (24.3)	82.8 (28.2)	84.2 (29.0)	77.8 (25.4)	66.3 (19.1)	47.4 (8.6)	24.4 (−4.2)	24.1 (−4.4)	85.6 (29.8)
Mean daily maximum °F (°C)	−8.6 (−22.6)	1.3 (−17.1)	17.5 (−8.1)	39.0 (3.9)	60.0 (15.6)	70.8 (21.6)	72.3 (22.4)	64.5 (18.1)	51.7 (10.9)	29.7 (−1.3)	3.9 (−15.6)	−4.6 (−20.3)	33.1 (0.6)
Daily mean °F (°C)	−16.4 (−26.9)	−9.7 (−23.2)	3.7 (−15.7)	27.3 (−2.6)	48.6 (9.2)	60.0 (15.6)	62.2 (16.8)	54.8 (12.7)	42.9 (6.1)	22.8 (−5.1)	−4.0 (−20.0)	−12.6 (−24.8)	23.3 (−4.8)
Mean daily minimum °F (°C)	−24.2 (−31.2)	−20.7 (−29.3)	−10.1 (−23.4)	15.7 (−9.1)	37.0 (2.8)	49.1 (9.5)	52.2 (11.2)	45.2 (7.3)	34.1 (1.2)	15.9 (−8.9)	−11.8 (−24.3)	−20.5 (−29.2)	13.5 (−10.3)
Mean minimum °F (°C)	−53.5 (−47.5)	−47.9 (−44.4)	−37.0 (−38.3)	−8.9 (−22.7)	23.4 (−4.8)	37.5 (3.1)	43.7 (6.5)	33.3 (0.7)	20.5 (−6.4)	−9.0 (−22.8)	−37.3 (−38.5)	−46.5 (−43.6)	−56.3 (−49.1)
Record low °F (°C)	−63 (−53)	−62 (−52)	−52 (−47)	−36 (−38)	6 (−14)	29 (−2)	35 (2)	26 (−3)	3 (−16)	−32 (−36)	−48 (−44)	−61 (−52)	−63 (−53)
Average precipitation inches (mm)	0.46 (12)	0.51 (13)	0.37 (9.4)	0.30 (7.6)	0.36 (9.1)	0.76 (19)	1.44 (37)	1.38 (35)	0.87 (22)	0.93 (24)	0.61 (15)	0.64 (16)	8.63 (219)
Average precipitation days (≥ 0.01 in)	3.5	3.6	3.1	2.1	2.1	3.8	6.4	7.0	6.3	6.6	4.3	3.9	52.7
Source: NOAA (precipitation 1991–2020)

Climate data for Fort Yukon (1961–1990 normals, extremes 1889–1990)
Month	Jan	Feb	Mar	Apr	May	Jun	Jul	Aug	Sep	Oct	Nov	Dec	Year
Record high °F (°C)	40 (4)	41 (5)	50 (10)	65 (18)	85 (29)	100 (38)	97 (36)	88 (31)	79 (26)	61 (16)	51 (11)	37 (3)	100 (38)
Mean maximum °F (°C)	16.6 (−8.6)	22.3 (−5.4)	35.5 (1.9)	51.9 (11.1)	72.1 (22.3)	83.6 (28.7)	84.9 (29.4)	78.7 (25.9)	64.0 (17.8)	44.1 (6.7)	18.6 (−7.4)	17.8 (−7.9)	87.0 (30.6)
Mean daily maximum °F (°C)	−9.9 (−23.3)	−2.9 (−19.4)	14.9 (−9.5)	34.2 (1.2)	56.2 (13.4)	71.5 (21.9)	73.2 (22.9)	65.7 (18.7)	50.7 (10.4)	25.1 (−3.8)	−0.5 (−18.1)	−6.3 (−21.3)	31.1 (−0.5)
Daily mean °F (°C)	−18.2 (−27.9)	−13.4 (−25.2)	3.1 (−16.1)	21.4 (−5.9)	45.0 (7.2)	60.6 (15.9)	63.1 (17.3)	56.3 (13.5)	41.2 (5.1)	18.5 (−7.5)	−8.2 (−22.3)	−14.8 (−26.0)	21.2 (−6.0)
Mean daily minimum °F (°C)	−26.0 (−32.2)	−22.1 (−30.1)	−10.2 (−23.4)	9.8 (−12.3)	33.2 (0.7)	48.9 (9.4)	52.0 (11.1)	45.7 (7.6)	32.5 (0.3)	11.5 (−11.4)	−14.0 (−25.6)	−22.2 (−30.1)	11.7 (−11.3)
Mean minimum °F (°C)	−51.5 (−46.4)	−48.5 (−44.7)	−33.3 (−36.3)	−15.5 (−26.4)	19.0 (−7.2)	36.0 (2.2)	41.7 (5.4)	31.7 (−0.2)	18.5 (−7.5)	−10.8 (−23.8)	−41.9 (−41.1)	−48.1 (−44.5)	−58.5 (−50.3)
Record low °F (°C)	−78 (−61)	−70 (−57)	−62 (−52)	−42 (−41)	−3 (−19)	25 (−4)	25 (−4)	21 (−6)	0 (−18)	−40 (−40)	−61 (−52)	−71 (−57)	−78 (−61)
Average precipitation inches (mm)	0.46 (12)	0.35 (8.9)	0.25 (6.4)	0.25 (6.4)	0.34 (8.6)	0.81 (21)	0.94 (24)	1.06 (27)	0.67 (17)	0.56 (14)	0.30 (7.6)	0.53 (13)	6.51 (165)
Average snowfall inches (cm)	4.8 (12)	4.1 (10)	2.2 (5.6)	1.6 (4.1)	0.2 (0.51)	0.0 (0.0)	0.0 (0.0)	0.1 (0.25)	0.5 (1.3)	4.4 (11)	3.5 (8.9)	5.8 (15)	27.2 (69)
Average precipitation days (≥ 0.01 in)	5.0	4.7	3.4	2.9	3.4	5.8	6.6	8.8	5.2	7.8	5.5	6.9	66.0
Average snowy days (≥ 0.1 inch)	5.8	4.7	3.5	3.2	0.3	0.0	0.0	0.1	0.4	5.0	4.4	6.5	33.9
Source 1: WRCC
Source 2: XMACIS (snowfall)

== Demographics ==
Historical population
Census	Pop.	Note	%±
1880	109		—
1900	156		—
1910	321		105.8%
1920	319		−0.6%
1930	304		−4.7%
1940	274		−9.9%
1950	446		62.8%
1960	701		57.2%
1970	448		−36.1%
1980	619		38.2%
1990	580		−6.3%
2000	595		2.6%
2010	583		−2.0%
2020	428		−26.6%
U.S. Decennial Census

Fort Yukon first appeared on the 1880 U.S. Census as an unincorporated village of 109 residents. Of those, 107 were members of the Tinneh Tribe and 2 were Whites. It did not appear on the 1890 census, but has returned in every successive census since 1900. It formally incorporated in 1959, the year Alaska became a state.

=== 2020 census ===
As of the 2020 census, Fort Yukon had a population of 428. The median age was 41.3 years. 26.2% of residents were under the age of 18 and 15.4% of residents were 65 years of age or older. For every 100 females there were 101.9 males, and for every 100 females age 18 and over there were 112.1 males age 18 and over.

0.0% of residents lived in urban areas, while 100.0% lived in rural areas.

There were 202 households in Fort Yukon, of which 28.7% had children under the age of 18 living in them. Of all households, 21.3% were married-couple households, 39.6% were households with a male householder and no spouse or partner present, and 31.2% were households with a female householder and no spouse or partner present. About 46.5% of all households were made up of individuals and 12.8% had someone living alone who was 65 years of age or older.

There were 282 housing units, of which 28.4% were vacant. The homeowner vacancy rate was 0.0% and the rental vacancy rate was 11.5%.

Racial composition as of the 2020 census
Race	Number	Percent
White	37	8.6%
Black or African American	0	0.0%
American Indian and Alaska Native	359	83.9%
Asian	0	0.0%
Native Hawaiian and Other Pacific Islander	0	0.0%
Some other race	0	0.0%
Two or more races	32	7.5%
Hispanic or Latino (of any race)	3	0.7%

=== 2000 census ===
As of the census of 2000, there were 595 people, 225 households, and 137 families residing in the city. The population density was 85.0 inhabitants per square mile (32.8/km^{2}). There were 317 housing units at an average density of 45.3 per square mile (17.5/km^{2}). The racial makeup of the city was 86.05% Native American, 10.76% White, 0.17% Black or African American, 0.17% Asian, and 0.17% from other races, and 2.69% from two or more races. Hispanic or Latino of any race were 1.34% of the population.

There were 225 households, out of which 36.0% had children under the age of 18 living with them, 25.8% were married couples living together, 23.1% had a female householder with no husband present, and 39.1% were non-families. 34.2% of all households were made up of individuals, and 5.8% had someone living alone who was 65 years of age or older. The average household size was 2.62 and the average family size was 3.37.

In the city, the population was spread out, with 33.4% under the age of 18, 10.3% from 18 to 24, 27.4% from 25 to 44, 22.0% from 45 to 64, and 6.9% who were 65 years of age or older. The median age was 32 years. For every 100 females, there were 112.5 males. For every 100 females age 18 and over, there were 111.8 males.

The median income for a household in the city was $29,375, and the median income for a family was $32,083. Males had a median income of $25,000 versus $27,813 for females. The per capita income for the city was $13,360. About 18.0% of families and 18.5% of the population were below the poverty line, including 14.3% of those under age 18 and 3.5% of those age 65 or over.

== Education ==
Yukon Flats School District operates the Fort Yukon School, serving Fort Yukon.

The University of Alaska (Fairbanks) operates a rural campus facility called the Yukon Flats Center.

== Notable people ==
- Hudson Stuck (1863–1920), Episcopal priest, social reformer, mountain climber (buried there in the native cemetery)
- Hannah Paul Solomon (1908–2011), first woman elected mayor of Fort Yukon
- Jonathon Solomon (1932–2006), Goldman Environmental Prize recipient for his efforts to protect the Arctic National Wildlife Refuge
- Don Young (1933–2022), longest-serving Republican member of the U.S. House of Representatives and of Congress in history
- Clarence Alexander (born 1939), First Chief of Fort Yukon
- Woodie Salmon (born 1952), politician, Representative, Alaska State House of Representatives, 2004–2010, former Chief, Chalkyitsik, Council Member, Fort Yukon Mayor, Fort Yukon
- F. Kay Wallis (born c. 1944), traditional healer and Representative, Alaska State House of Representatives, 1985–1990
- Velma Wallis (born 1960), Native American writer
